= Members of the Vermont House of Representatives, 2007–08 session =

The following is a list of the persons who served in the Vermont House of Representatives during the 2007-2008 session:

== Members Listed by District ==
=== Addison-1 ===
- Steven B. Maier, Democrat
- Betty A. Nuovo, Democrat

=== Addison-2 ===
- Willem W. Jewett, Democrat

=== Addison-3 ===
- Gregory S. Clark, Republican
- Kitty Oxholm, Republican (defeated 2008)

=== Addison-4 ===
- Michael Fisher, Democrat
- David Sharpe, Democrat

=== Addison-5 ===
- Christopher Bray, Democrat

=== Addison-Rutland-1 ===
- Will Stevens, Independent

=== Bennington-1 ===
- Bill Botzow, Democrat

=== Bennington-2-1 ===
- Timothy R. Corcoran, II, Democrat
- Joseph L. Krawczyk, Jr., Republican

=== Bennington-2-2 ===
- Anne H. Mook, Democrat
- Mary A. Morrissey, Republican

=== Bennington-3 ===
- Alice Miller, Democrat

=== Bennington-4 ===
- Judith Livingston, Republican (defeated 2008)

=== Bennington-5 ===
- Cynthia Browning, Democrat

=== Bennington-Rutland-1 ===
- Patti Komline, Republican

=== Caledonia-1 ===
- Leigh Larocque, Republican

=== Caledonia-2 ===
- Lucy Leriche, Democrat

=== Caledonia-3 ===
- Donald E. Bostic, Republican (retired 2008)
- David T. Clark, Republican

=== Caledonia-4 ===
- Cola H. Hudson, Republican (retired 2008)
- Richard Lawrence, Republican

=== Caledonia-Washington-1 ===
- Steve Larrabee, Republican (retired 2008)

=== Chittenden-1-1 ===
- William J. Lippert, Democrat

=== Chittenden-1-2 ===
- Scott A. Orr, Democrat

=== Chittenden-2 ===
- Jim McCullough, Democrat
- Mary N. Peterson, Democrat (retired 2008)

=== Chittenden-3-1 ===
- William N. Aswad, Democrat
- Kurt Wright, Republican

=== Chittenden-3-2 ===
- Mark Larson, Democrat

=== Chittenden-3-3 ===
- Jason P. Lorber, Democrat
- Rachel Weston, Democrat

=== Chittenden-3-4 ===
- Christopher A Pearson, Progressive (defeated 2008)
- David Zuckerman, Progressive

=== Chittenden-3-5 ===
- Johannah Leddy Donovan, Democrat
- Bill Keogh, Democrat (lost primary, 2008)

=== Chittenden-3-6 ===
- Kenneth W. Atkins, Democrat
- Clem Bissonnette, Democrat

=== Chittenden-3-7 ===
- Michele Kupersmith, Democrat (retired 2008)

=== Chittenden-3-8 ===
- Ann D. Pugh, Democrat

=== Chittenden-3-9 ===
- Albert C. "Sonny" Audette, Democrat

=== Chittenden-3-10 ===
- Helen Head, Democrat

=== Chittenden-4 ===
- Denise Begins Barnard, Democrat (retired to run unsuccessfully for Senate, 2008)

=== Chittenden-5-1 ===
- Joyce Errecart, Republican (defeated 2008)

=== Chittenden-5-2 ===
- Joan Lenes, Democrat

=== Chittenden-6-1 ===
- Debbie Evans, Democrat
- Linda K. Myers, Republican

=== Chittenden-6-2 ===
- Peter D. Hunt, Democrat (retired 2008)
- Tim Jerman, Democrat

=== Chittenden-6-3 ===
- Martha P. Heath, Democrat

=== Chittenden-7-1 ===
- Jim Condon, Democrat
- John Zenie, Democrat

=== Chittenden-7-2 ===
- Patrick M. Brennan, Republican
- Kristy Spengler, Democrat

=== Chittenden-8 ===
- William R. Frank, Democrat
- Gaye R. Symington, Democrat (House Speaker) (retired 2008 to unsuccessfully run for governor)

=== Chittenden-9 ===
- Reginald Godin, Democrat (defeated 2008)
- Donald H. Turner, Republican

=== Essex-Caledonia ===
- Janice L. Peaslee, Republican

=== Essex-Caledonia-Orleans ===
- William F. Johnson, Republican

=== Franklin-1 ===
- Carolyn Whitney Branagan, Republican
- Gary Gilbert, Democratic

=== Franklin-2 ===
- George R. Allard, Democrat (lost primary, 2008)
- Richard J. Howrigan, Democrat

=== Franklin-3 ===
- James Fitzgerald, Democrat (retired 2008)
- Kathleen C. Keenan, Democrat

=== Franklin-4 ===
- Avis L. Gervais, Democrat (retired 2008)

=== Franklin-5 ===
- Kathy LaBelle LaVoie, Republican (retired 2008)
- Michel Consejo, Democrat

=== Franklin-6 ===
- Norman H. McAllister, Republican
- Albert J. Perry, Democrat (retired 2008)

=== Grand Isle-Chittenden-1-1 ===
- Mitzi Johnson, Democrat
- Ira Trombley, Democrat

=== Lamoille-1 ===
- Heidi Scheuermann, Republican

=== Lamoille-2 ===
- Linda J. Martin, Democrat

=== Lamoille-3 ===
- Floyd W. Nease, Democrat

=== Lamoille-4 ===
- Richard A. Westman, Republican

=== Lamoille-Washington-1 ===
- Peter Peltz, Democrat
- Shap Smith, Democrat (elected House Speaker in 2009-2010 session following Symington's departure)

=== Orange-1 ===
- Susan Davis, Progressive
- Philip C. Winters, Republican

=== Orange-2 ===
- Sarah Copeland-Hanzas, Democrat

=== Orange-Addison-1 ===
- Patsy French, Democrat
- Jim Hutchinson, Democrat (retired 2008)

=== Orange-Caledonia-1 ===
- Harvey B. "Bud" Otterman, Jr., Republican (defeated 2008)

=== Orleans-1 ===
- Robert Lewis, Republican (replaced Loren Shawn)
- Scott Wheeler, Republican

=== Orleans-2 ===
- Duncan F. Kilmartin, Republican
- Michael J. Marcotte, Republican

=== Orleans-Caledonia-1 ===
- John Morley, Republican
- John S. Rodgers, Democrat

=== Orleans-Franklin-1 ===
- Dexter Randall, Progressive (defeated 2008)

=== Rutland-1-1 ===
- Andrew P. Donaghy, Republican

=== Rutland-1-2 ===
- Joseph Baker, Republican
- Dave Potter, Democrat

=== Rutland-2 ===
- William Canfield, Republican
- Robert Helm, Republican

=== Rutland-3 ===
- Gail Fallar, Democrat (retired 2008)

=== Rutland-4 ===
- David A. Sunderland, Republican (retired 2008)

=== Rutland-5-1 ===
- Virginia McCormack, Democrat (defeated 2008)

=== Rutland-5-2 ===
- Peg Andrews, Democrat

=== Rutland-5-3 ===
- Steven James Howard, Democrat

=== Rutland-5-4 ===
- Gale Courcelle, Democrat

=== Rutland-6 ===
- Margaret Flory, Republican

=== Rutland-7 ===
- Joe Acinapura, Republican

=== Rutland-8 ===
- John W. Malcolm, Democrat

=== Rutland-Windsor-1 ===
- Harry L. Chen, Democrat (retired 2008)

=== Washington-1 ===
- Carol Hosford, Democrat (defeated 2008)

=== Washington-2 ===
- Anne B. Donahue, Republican
- Maxine Jo Grad, Democrat

=== Washington-3-1 ===
- Leo M. Valliere, Republican (defeated 2008)

=== Washington-3-2 ===
- Harry S. Monti, Democrat (retired 2008)

=== Washington-3-3 ===
- Pat McDonald, Republican

=== Washington-4 ===
- Thomas F. Koch, Republican
- Francis M. McFaun, Republican

=== Washington-5 ===
- Francis K. Brooks, Democrat (retired 2007 to become sergeant at arms. His successor, Jon Anderson, was appointed by Gov. Jim Douglas and lost the 2008 Democratic primary.)
- Warren F. Kitzmiller, Democrat

=== Washington-6 ===
- Janet Ancel, Democrat

=== Washington-7 ===
- Tony Klein, Democrat

=== Washington-Chittenden-1 ===
- Robert Dostis, Democrat (retired 2008)
- Sue Minter, Democrat

=== Windham-1 ===
- Patty O'Donnell, Republican

=== Windham-2 ===
- Ann Manwaring, Democrat

=== Windham-3-1 ===
- Virginia A. Milkey, Democrat

=== Windham-3-2 ===
- Daryl L. Pillsbury, Independent (retired 2008)

=== Windham-3-3 ===
- Sarah R. Edwards, Progressive

=== Windham-4 ===
- Michael J. Obuchowski, Democrat
- Carolyn W. Partridge, Democrat

=== Windham-5 ===
- David L. Deen, Democrat
- Mike Mrowicki, Democrat

=== Windham-6 ===
- Richard J. Marek, Democrat

=== Windham-Bennington-1 ===
- John Moran, Democrat

=== Windham-Bennington-Windsor-1 ===
- Vacant

=== Windsor-1-1 ===
- Kathy Pellett, Democrat

=== Windsor-1-2 ===
- Alice M. Emmons, Democrat
- Clint Martin, Democrat—Rep. Martin died on December 17, 2006, following a year-long fight with cancer.
- Cynthia Martin, Democrat—On January 16, 2007, Governor Jim Douglas appointed Cynthia Martin (Clint Martin's widow) to serve out the balance of his term.

=== Windsor-2 ===
- Ernest W. Shand, Democrat

=== Windsor-3 ===
- Donna G. Sweaney, Democrat

=== Windsor-4 ===
- Steven C. Adams, Republican

=== Windsor-5 ===
- Alison H. Clarkson, Democrat

=== Windsor-6-1 ===
- Mark Mitchell, Democrat

=== Windsor-6-2 ===
- John Clerkin, Republican
- Hilde Ojibway, Democrat (retired 2008)

=== Windsor-Orange-1 ===
- David Ainsworth, Republican

=== Windsor-Orange-2 ===
- Margaret Cheney, Democrat
- Jim Masland, Democrat

=== Windsor-Rutland-1 ===
- Dennis J. Devereux, Republican

=== Windsor-Rutland-2 ===
- Sandy Haas, Progressive

Preceded by 2005-2006	Vermont House of Representatives; 2007-2008	Succeeded by 2009-2010

== See also ==
- Vermont Representative Districts, 2002-2012
- Members of the Vermont Senate, 2005-2006 session
- List of Vermont General Assemblies
