= Members of the Vermont House of Representatives, 2005–06 session =

The following is a list of the persons who have served in the Vermont House of Representatives during the 2005-2006 session:

== Members Listed by District ==
=== Addison-1 ===
- Steven B. Maier, Democrat
- Betty A. Nuovo, Democrat

=== Addison-2 ===
- Willem W. Jewett, Democrat

=== Addison-3 ===
- Gregory S. Clark, Republican
- Constance T. Houston, Republican
  RETIRING

=== Addison-4 ===
- Michael Fisher, Democrat
- David Sharpe, Democrat

=== Addison-5 ===
- Harvey T. Smith, Republican

=== Addison-Rutland-1 ===
- Mark S. Young, Republican
  RETIRING

=== Bennington-1 ===
- Bill Botzow, Democrat

=== Bennington-2-1 ===
- Timothy R. Corcoran, II, Democrat
- Joseph L. Krawczyk, Jr., Republican

=== Bennington-2-2 ===
- Anne H. Mook, Democrat
- Mary A. Morrissey, Republican

=== Bennington-3 ===
- Alice Miller, Democrat

=== Bennington-4 ===
- Judith Livingston, Republican

=== Bennington-5 ===
- Lawrence E. Molloy, Democrat
  RETIRING

=== Bennington-Rutland-1 ===
- Patti Komline, Republican

=== Caledonia-1 ===
- Leigh Larocque, Republican

=== Caledonia-2 ===
- Lucy Leriche, Democrat

=== Caledonia-3 ===
- Donald E. Bostic, Republican
- David T. Clark, Republican

=== Caledonia-4 ===
- Cola H. Hudson, Republican
- Richard Lawrence, Republican

=== Caledonia-Washington-1 ===
- Steve Larrabee, Republican

=== Chittenden-1-1 ===
- William J. Lippert, Democrat

=== Chittenden-1-2 ===
- Scott A. Orr, Democrat

=== Chittenden-2 ===
- Jim McCullough, Democrat
- Mary N. Peterson, Democrat

=== Chittenden-3-1 ===
- William N. Aswad, Democrat
- Kurt Wright, Republican

=== Chittenden-3-2 ===
- Mark Larson, Democrat

=== Chittenden-3-3 ===
- Jason P. Lorber, Democrat
- John Patrick Tracy, Democrat

=== Chittenden-3-4 ===
- Bob Kiss, Progressive (Stepped down from House on April 1, 2006 after being elected Mayor of Burlington)
- Christopher A Pearson, Progressive (Appointed by Governor James Douglas to serve out the remainder of the term of Bob Kiss)

- David Zuckerman, Progressive

=== Chittenden-3-5 ===
- Johannah Leddy Donovan, Democrat
- Bill Keogh, Democrat

=== Chittenden-3-6 ===
- Kenneth W. Atkins, Democrat
- George C. Cross, Democrat
  RETIRING

=== Chittenden-3-7 ===
- Michele Kupersmith, Democrat

=== Chittenden-3-8 ===
- Ann D. Pugh, Democrat

=== Chittenden-3-9 ===
- Albert "Sonny" C. Audette, Democrat

=== Chittenden-3-10 ===
- Helen Head, Democrat

=== Chittenden-4 ===
- Denise B. Barnard, Democrat

=== Chittenden-5-1 ===
- Joyce Errecart, Republican

=== Chittenden-5-2 ===
- Stephen B. Dates, Republican

=== Chittenden-6-1 ===
- Debbie Evans, Democrat
- Linda K. Myers, Republican

=== Chittenden-6-2 ===
- Peter D. Hunt, Democrat
- Tim Jerman, Democrat

=== Chittenden-6-3 ===
- Martha P. Heath, Democrat

=== Chittenden-7-1 ===
- Jim Condon, Democrat
- Malcolm F. Severance, Republican
  RETIRING

=== Chittenden-7-2 ===
- Patrick M. Brennan, Republican
- Kathrine R. Niquette, Republican

=== Chittenden-8 ===
- William R. Frank, Democrat
- Gaye R. Symington, Democrat (House Speaker)

=== Chittenden-9 ===
- Kevin J. Endres, Republican
  RETIRING
- Donald H. Turner, Republican

=== Essex-Caledonia ===
- Janice L. Peaslee, Republican

=== Essex-Caledonia-Orleans ===
- William F. Johnson, Republican

=== Franklin-1 ===
- Carolyn Whitney Branagan, Republican
- Brian C. Dunsmore, Republican

=== Franklin-2 ===
- George R. Allard, Democrat
- Richard J. Howrigan, Democrat

=== Franklin-3 ===
- Kathleen C. Keenan, Democrat
- Alan Parent, Republican
  RUNNING FOR STATE SENATE-FRANKLIN DISTRICT

=== Franklin-4 ===
- Avis L. Gervais, Democrat

=== Franklin-5 ===
- Kathy LaBelle LaVoie, Republican
- John S. Winters, Republican
  RETIRING

=== Franklin-6 ===
- Norman H. McAllister, Republican
- Albert J. Perry, Democrat

=== Grand Isle-Chittenden-1-1 ===
- Mitzi Johnson, Democrat
- Ira Trombley, Democrat

=== Lamoille-1 ===
- Richard C. Marron, Republican
  RETIRING

=== Lamoille-2 ===
- Linda J. Martin, Democrat

=== Lamoille-3 ===
- Floyd W. Nease, Democrat

=== Lamoille-4 ===
- Richard A. Westman, Republican

=== Lamoille-Washington-1 ===
- Warren Miller, Republican
  RETIRING
- Shap Smith, Democrat

=== Orange-1 ===
- Sylvia R. Kennedy, Republican
- Philip C. Winters, Republican

=== Orange-2 ===
- Sarah Copeland-Hanzas, Democrat

=== Orange-Addison-1 ===
- Patsy French, Democrat
- Jim Hutchinson, Democrat

=== Orange-Caledonia-1 ===
- Harvey B. Otterman, Republican

=== Orleans-1 ===
- Winston E. Dowland, Progressive
- Loren T. Shaw, Republican

=== Orleans-2 ===
- Duncan F. Kilmartin, Republican
- Michael J. Marcotte, Republican

=== Orleans-Caledonia-1 ===
- John Morley, Republican
- John S. Rodgers, Democrat

=== Orleans-Franklin-1 ===
- Dexter Randall, Progressive

=== Rutland-1-1 ===
- Andrew P. Donaghy, Republican

=== Rutland-1-2 ===
- Joseph Baker, Republican
- Dave Potter, Democrat

=== Rutland-2 ===
- William Canfield, Republican
- Robert Helm, Republican

=== Rutland-3 ===
- Gail Fallar, Democrat

=== Rutland-4 ===
- David A. Sunderland, Republican

=== Rutland-5-1 ===
- Christopher C. Louras, Republican
  RETIRING

=== Rutland-5-2 ===
- Thomas S. DePoy, Republican

=== Rutland-5-3 ===
- Steven J. Howard, Democrat

=== Rutland-5-4 ===
- David W. Allaire, Republican

=== Rutland-6 ===
- Margaret Flory, Republican

=== Rutland-7 ===
- Joe Acinapura, Republican

=== Rutland-8 ===
- John W. Malcolm, Democrat

=== Rutland-Windsor-1 ===
- Harry L. Chen, Democrat

=== Washington-1 ===
- Carol Hosford, Democrat

=== Washington-2 ===
- Anne B. Donahue, Republican
- Maxine Jo Grad, Democrat

=== Washington-3-1 ===
- Leo M. Valliere, Republican

=== Washington-3-2 ===
- Harry S. Monti, Democrat

=== Washington-3-3 ===
- Stephen Green, Democrat
  RETIRING

=== Washington-4 ===
- Thomas F. Koch, Republican
- Francis M. McFaun, Republican

=== Washington-5 ===
- Francis K. Brooks, Democrat

=== Washington-6 ===
- Janet Ancel, Democrat

=== Washington-7 ===
- Tony Klein, Democrat

=== Washington-Chittenden-1 ===
- Robert Dostis, Democrat
- Sue Minter, Democrat

=== Windham-1 ===
- Patty O'Donnell, Republican

=== Windham-2 ===
- Robert Rusten, Democrat
  RETIRING

=== Windham-3-1 ===
- Virginia A. Milkey, Democrat

=== Windham-3-2 ===
- Daryl L. Pillsbury, Independent

=== Windham-3-3 ===
- Sarah R. Edwards, Progressive

=== Windham-4 ===
- Michael J. Obuchowski, Democrat
- Carolyn W. Partridge, Democrat

=== Windham-5 ===
- Steve Darrow, Democrat
- David L. Deen, Democrat

=== Windham-6 ===
- Richard J. Marek, Democrat

=== Windham-Bennington-1 ===
- Philip E. Bartlett, Republican

=== Windham-Bennington-Windsor-1 ===
- Richard W. Hube, Republican

=== Windsor-1-1 ===
- Kathy Pellett, Democrat

=== Windsor-1-2 ===
- Alice M. Emmons, Democrat
- Clint Martin, Democrat

=== Windsor-2 ===
- Ernest Shand, Democrat

=== Windsor-3 ===
- Donna G. Sweaney, Democrat

=== Windsor-4 ===
- Steven C. Adams, Republican

=== Windsor-5 ===
- Alison H. Clarkson, Democrat

=== Windsor-6-1 ===
- Michael S. Reese, Democrat
  RETIRING

=== Windsor-6-2 ===
- Lynn L. Bohi, Democrat
  RETIRING
- Michael R. Kainen, Republican

=== Windsor-Orange-1 ===
- Rosemary McLaughlin, Democrat

=== Windsor-Orange-2 ===
- Jim Masland, Democrat
- Ann Seibert, Democrat
  RETIRING

=== Windsor-Rutland-1 ===
- Alice W. Nitka, Democrat
  RUNNING FOR STATE SENATE-WINDSOR DISTRICT

=== Windsor-Rutland-2 ===
- Sandy Haas, Progressive

Preceded by 2003-2004	Vermont House of Representatives; 2005-2006	Succeeded by 2007-2008

== See also ==
- Members of the Vermont Senate, 2005-2006 session
- Vermont Representative Districts, 2002-2012
- List of Vermont General Assemblies
