= Stephen W. Webster =

American attorney and politician from Vermont

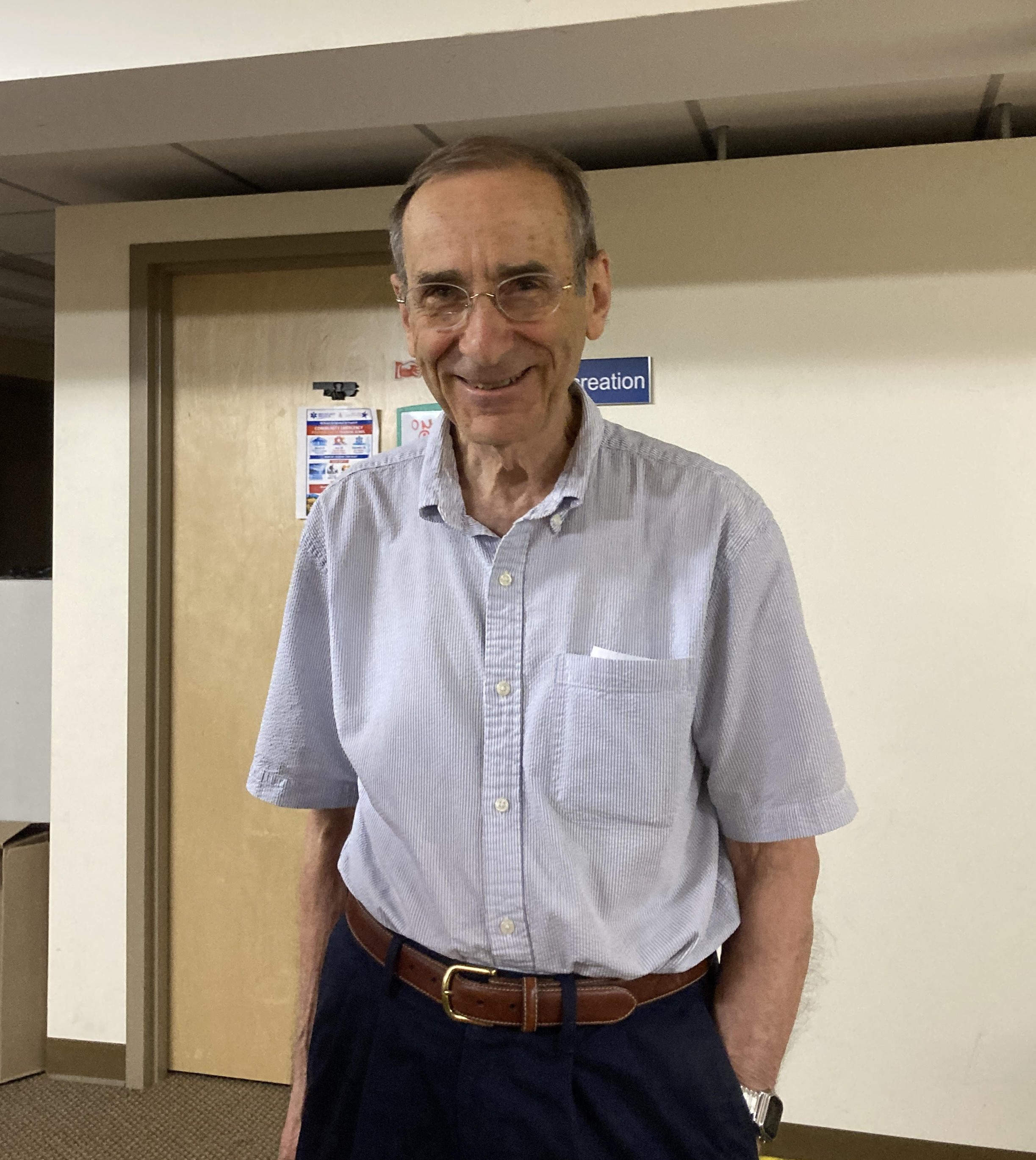

76th President pro tempore of the Vermont Senate
- In office 1995–1997
- Preceded by: John H. Bloomer
- Succeeded by: Peter Shumlin

Member of the Vermont Senate from the Orange District
- In office 1987–1997
- Preceded by: Allen D. Avery
- Succeeded by: Mark MacDonald

Member of the Vermont House of Representatives from the Orange-1 District
- In office 2001–2005 Serving with Philip A. Angell Jr.
- Preceded by: Philip A. Angell Jr., Richard W. Mallary
- Succeeded by: Patsy French, Jim Hutchinson (Orange-Addison-1 District)
- In office 1983–1985 Serving with Ralph D. Baker
- Preceded by: Harold Baker, Barbara Wood (Windsor-Orange-1 District)
- Succeeded by: Ralph D. Baker, Donald M. Hooper (Orange-1 District)

State's Attorney of Orange County, Vermont
- In office June 29, 1972 – January 31, 1979
- Preceded by: Philip A. Angell Jr.
- Succeeded by: James D. McKnight

Personal details
- Born: December 9, 1943 (age 82) Randolph, Vermont, U.S.
- Party: Republican
- Spouse: Susan E. Cliff
- Children: 3
- Education: Massachusetts Institute of Technology; Boston College Law School

Stephen W. Webster (born December 9, 1943) is an American attorney, politician and woodland manager from Vermont. He served as President of the Vermont State Senate from 1995 to 1997.

== Biography ==
Stephen Winfield Webster was born in Randolph, Vermont on December 9, 1943. He was educated in the Randolph public schools and graduated from the Massachusetts Institute of Technology with a Bachelor of Science degree in civil engineering in 1966.

Webster was a member of the United States Army Reserve from 1966 to 1972. In 1970, Webster graduated from Boston College Law School with a Juris Doctor degree.

In addition to practicing law in Randolph and working as a woodland manager, Webster was a member of the boards of directors of the Randolph National Bank and the Vermont Woodlands Association. He served as State's Attorney of Orange County from 1972 to 1979.

A Republican, Webster served in the Vermont House of Representatives from 1983 to 1985.

From 1987 to 1997, Webster served in the Vermont Senate. In 1995, he was elected Senate President following the death of John H. Bloomer. Webster served until 1997 and was an unsuccessful candidate for reelection to his Senate seat in 1996 and 1998, losing both times to Mark MacDonald.

Webster served again in the Vermont House from 2001 to 2005. In addition, he remained active in Randolph, including service on the board of selectmen.

In three additional elections as the Republican nominee for State Senator (2006, 2010, and 2016), Webster ran unsuccessfully against MacDonald. In 2018, Webster ran unsuccessfully for a seat in the Vermont House. He is currently an elected Justice of the Peace in Randolph, Vermont.

Political offices
Preceded by John H. Bloomer	President pro tempore of the Vermont State Senate; 1995 – 1997	Succeeded by Peter Shumlin
