= Scott Wheeler (politician) =

American politician (born 1965)

Scott Wheeler (born 1965) is a former Republican politician who was elected and served in the Vermont House of Representatives from 2007 to 2010. He represented the Orleans-1 Representative District.
