= David M. Ainsworth =

American politician (1954–2019)

Member of the Vermont House of Representatives from the Windsor-Orange-1 district
- In office 2017–2019
- Preceded by: Sarah E. Buxton
- Succeeded by: John O'Brien
- In office 2007–2011
- Preceded by: Rosemary McLaughlin
- Succeeded by: Sarah E. Buxton

Personal details
- Born: July 8, 1954 Hanover, New Hampshire, U.S.
- Died: May 31, 2019 (aged 64) Lebanon, New Hampshire, U.S.
- Party: Republican
- Spouse: Peggy
- Children: 3
- Education: University of Vermont (BS)
- Profession: Dairy farmer Vegetable grower/marketer

David M. Ainsworth (July 8, 1954 – May 31, 2019) was an American politician and a Republican member of the Vermont House of Representatives representing Windsor-Orange-1 District.

Born in Hanover, New Hampshire, he held a B.S. from University of Vermont (1977). Ainsworth was a fifth-generation dairy and vegetable farmer.

Ainsworth was former Royalton Town Moderator. He was elected to the Vermont House of Representatives in 2016, unseating incumbent Democrat Sarah E. Buxton by one vote. Two years later in 2018, Ainsworth was defeated for re-election by John O'Brien. Ainsworth previously served as the State Representative from 2007 to 2011.
