= Chittenden-1-1 Vermont Representative District, 2002–2012 =

Vermont House of Representatives district

Coordinates: 44°19′50″N 73°6′0″W

The Chittenden-1-1 Representative District is a one-member state Representative district in the U.S. state of Vermont. It is one of the 108 one- or two-member districts into which the state was divided by the redistricting and reapportionment plan developed by the Vermont General Assembly following the 2000 U.S. census. The plan applies to legislatures elected in 2002, 2004, 2006, 2008, and 2010. A new plan will be developed in 2012 following the 2010 United States census.

The Chittenden-1-1 District includes all of the Chittenden County town of Hinesburg:

except two portions: the first being that portion of the town of Hinesburg in the southwest corner of the town bounded by a line beginning at the intersection of the Monkton town line and Baldwin Road, then northerly along Baldwin Road to its intersection with Drinkwater Road, then westerly along the centerline of Drinkwater Road to the Charlotte town line, and the second being that portion of the town of Hinesburg in the northwest corner of the town bounded by a line beginning at the junction of VT 116 and the St. George town line, then southerly along the centerline of VT 116 to its intersection with Falls Road, then westerly along the centerline of Falls Road to its intersection with O'Neill Road, then westerly along the centerline of O'Neill Road to the Charlotte town border.

— Vermont Statutes, Title 17, Chapter 34, Section 1893a

The rest of Hinesburg is in Chittenden-1-2.

As of the 2000 census, the state as a whole had a population of 608,827. As there are a total of 150 representatives, there were 4,059 residents per representative (or 8,118 residents per two representatives). The one member Chittenden-1-1 District had a population of 4,185 in that same census, 3.1% above the state average.

== District representative ==
- William J. Lippert, Democrat

== See also ==
- Members of the Vermont House of Representatives, 2005-2006 session
- Vermont Representative Districts, 2002-2012
