= Grand Isle-Chittenden-1-1 Vermont Representative District, 2002–2012 =

American legislative district

Coordinates: 44°48′N 73°18′W

The Grand Isle-Chittenden-1-1 Representative District is a two-member state Representative district in the U.S. state of Vermont. It is one of the 108 one or two member districts into which the state was divided by the redistricting and reapportionment plan developed by the Vermont General Assembly following the 2000 U.S. census. The plan applies to legislatures elected in 2002, 2004, 2006, 2008, and 2010. A new plan will be developed in 2012 following the 2010 U.S. census.

The Grand Isle-Chittenden-1-1 District includes the Grand Isle County towns of Alburgh, Grand Isle, Isle La Motte, North Hero, and South Hero, as well as a section of the Chittenden County town of Milton defined as follows:

{{blockquote|text=that portion of the town of Milton bounded by a line beginning at the mouth of the Lamoille River and Lake Champlain, then along the river upstream to the Interstate 89 bridge crossing the Lamoille River, then northerly along Interstate 89 to the Georgia town line, then along the Georgia town line to Lake Champlain, then southerly along the lakeshore to the place of beginning.|author=Vermont Statutes, Title 17, Chapter 34, Section 1893a

The rest of Milton is in Chittenden-9.

As of the 2000 census, the state as a whole had a population of 608,827. As there are a total of 150 representatives, there were 4,059 residents per representative (or 8,118 residents per two representatives). The two member Grand Isle-Chittenden-1-1 District had a population of 8,197 in that same census, 0.97% above the state average.

== District representatives ==
- Mitzi Johnson, Democrat
- Ira Trombley, Democrat

== See also ==
- Members of the Vermont House of Representatives, 2005-2006 session
- Vermont Representative Districts, 2002-2012
