= Robert W. Lewis =

American politician

Robert W. Lewis (born December 15, 1951) is a Republican member of the Vermont House of Representatives, representing Orleans District 1.

== Education ==
Lewis attended the State University of New York (SUNY) at Morrisville. He then received his associate degree in Criminal Justice from Ulster County Community College. Lewis is also a graduate of both the Nebraska State Patrol and the Vermont State Police Academies.

== Professional experience ==
Robert Lewis served as a law enforcement officer for over 30 years. Lewis began his career with the New York State Department of Corrections in 1973. Lewis then served as a trooper for the Nebraska State Patrol from 1977 to 1984. Lewis then served as a trooper for the Vermont State Police from 1984 to 1989. From 1989 to 2007, Lewis served as a game warden for the State of Vermont.

== Political experience ==
Lewis was appointed to the Vermont House of Representatives by Governor Jim Douglas in the winter of 2007. He was then elected to the House of Representatives in November, 2008. He has served in that position since, representing the Orleans District 1.

== Committee membership ==
Lewis serves on the Fish, Wildlife and Water Resources Committee, Vermont House of Representatives.

== Personal ==
Lewis is married and has two children.

== Sources ==
- http://ballotpedia.org/wiki/index.php/Robert_Lewis,_Vermont_Representative
- Orleans-1 Vermont Representative District, 2002–2012
