= Vermont House of Representatives districts =

Legislative districts of Vermont, US

Vermont's state House of Representatives consists of 150 members elected from 108 single or two-member districts as provided for in the redistricting and reapportionment plan developed by the Vermont General Assembly following the 2000 U.S. census. The plan applies to legislatures elected in 2002, 2004, 2006, 2008, and 2010. A new plan will be developed in 2012 following the 2010 U.S. census.

As of the 2000 census, the state as a whole had a population of 608,827. As there are a total of 150 representatives, there were 4059 residents per representative.

== Members per district ==
The Vermont Constitution (Chapter 2, Section 13) requires that House districts be limited to one or two members. Representatives in two-member districts are elected at-large throughout the district. There are 66 single-member and 42 two-member districts.

== Apportionment process ==
The process of drawing district lines and apportioning representatives is spelled out in detail in Title 17, Chapter 34A of the Vermont Statutes.

An initial plan divided the state into a number of districts ranging from one to fifteen members. The boards of civil authority in those towns in multi-member districts met (in joint sessions, where more than one town was involved) to decide on a plan to subdivide the district into one or two member sub-districts, in accordance with the state's constitutional requirement that representative districts be one or two members. The legislature then enacted the finalized plan. The initial division and subsequent sub-divisions are contained in Title 17, Chapter 34 of the Vermont Statutes.

== Districts ==
District	Members	District	Members	District	Members
Addison-1	2	Chittenden-6-3	1	Rutland-6	1
Addison-2	1	Chittenden-7-1	2	Rutland-7	1
Addison-3	2	Chittenden-7-2	2	Rutland-8	1
Addison-4	2	Chittenden-8	2	Rutland-Windsor-1	1
Addison-5	1	Chittenden-9	2	Washington-1	1
Addison-Rutland-1	1	Essex-Caledonia	1	Washington-2	2
Bennington-1	1	Essex-Caledonia-Orleans	1	Washington-3-1	1
Bennington-2-1	2	Franklin-1	2	Washington-3-2	1
Bennington-2-2	2	Franklin-2	2	Washington-3-3	1
Bennington-3	1	Franklin-3	2	Washington-4	2
Bennington-4	1	Franklin-4	1	Washington-5	2
Bennington-5	1	Franklin-5	2	Washington-6	1
Bennington-Rutland-1	1	Franklin-6	2	Washington-7	1
Caledonia-1	1	Grand Isle-Chittenden-1-1	2	Washington-Chittenden-1	2
Caledonia-2	1	Lamoille-1	1	Windham-1	1
Caledonia-3	2	Lamoille-2	1	Windham-2	1
Caledonia-4	2	Lamoille-3	1	Windham-3-1	1
Caledonia-Washington-1	1	Lamoille-4	1	Windham-3-2	1
Chittenden-1-1	1	Lamoille-Washington-1	2	Windham-3-3	1
Chittenden-1-2	1	Orange-1	2	Windham-4	2
Chittenden-2	2	Orange-2	1	Windham-5	2
Chittenden-3-1	2	Orange-Addison-1	2	Windham-6	1
Chittenden-3-2	1	Orange-Caledonia-1	1	Windham-Bennington-1	1
Chittenden-3-3	2	Orleans-1	2	Windham-Bennington-Windsor-1	1
Chittenden-3-4	2	Orleans-2	2	Windsor-1-1	1
Chittenden-3-5	2	Orleans-Caledonia-1	2	Windsor-1-2	2
Chittenden-3-6	2	Orleans-Franklin-1	1	Windsor-2	1
Chittenden-3-7	1	Rutland-1-1	1	Windsor-3	1
Chittenden-3-8	1	Rutland-1-2	2	Windsor-4	1
Chittenden-3-9	1	Rutland-2	2	Windsor-5	1
Chittenden-3-10	1	Rutland-3	1	Windsor-6-1	1
Chittenden-4	1	Rutland-4	1	Windsor-6-2	2
Chittenden-5-1	1	Rutland-5-1	1	Windsor-Orange-1	1
Chittenden-5-2	1	Rutland-5-2	1	Windsor-Orange-2	2
Chittenden-6-1	2	Rutland-5-3	1	Windsor-Rutland-1	1
Chittenden-6-2	2	Rutland-5-4	1	Windsor-Rutland-2	1

== See also ==
- Members of the Vermont House of Representatives, 2005–2006 session
- Members of the Vermont House of Representatives, 2007–2008 session
- Vermont Senate
