= Dave Potter (Vermont politician) =

American politician from Vermont

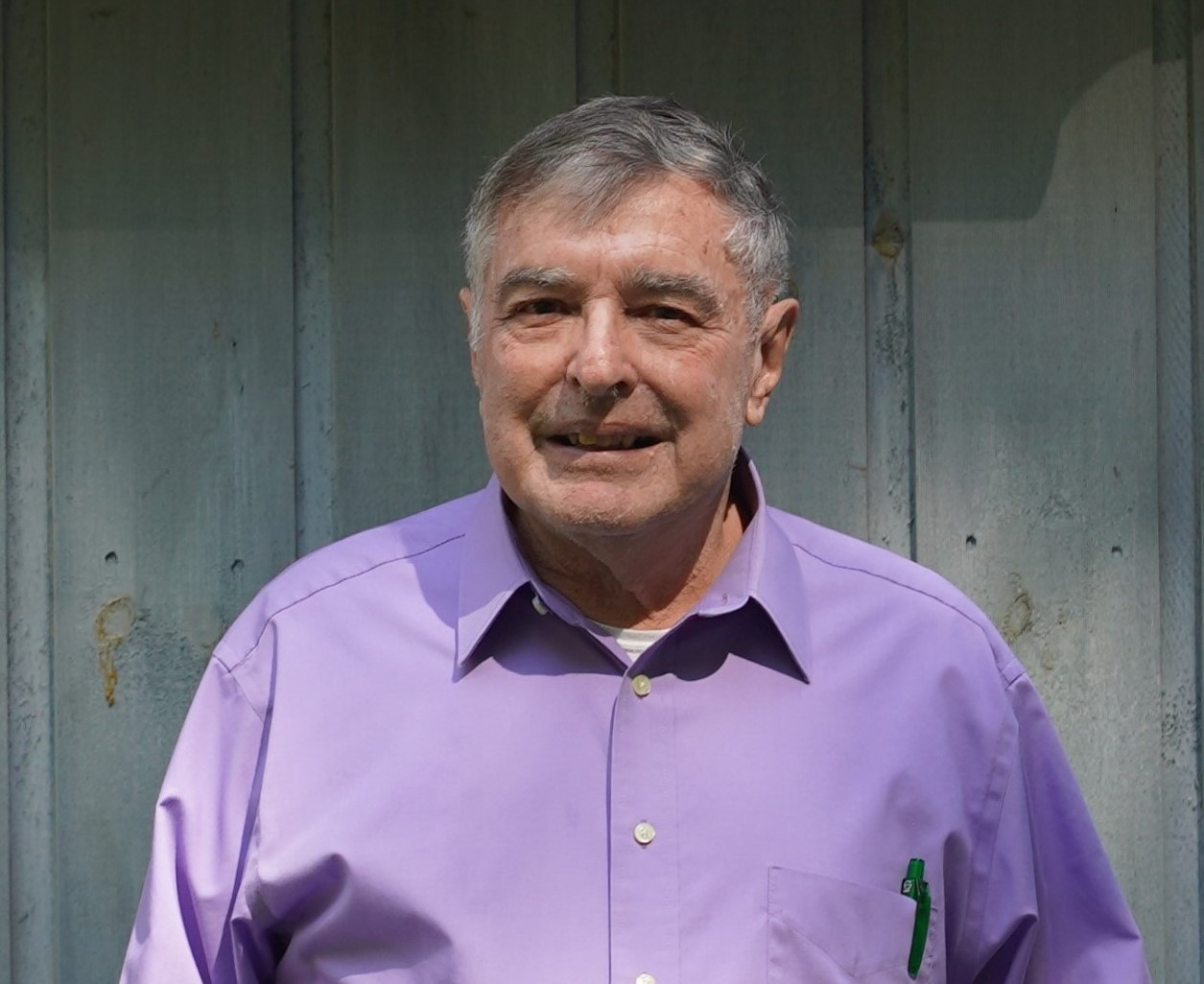

Member of the Vermont House of Representatives from the Rutland-2 District district
- In office 2005 – January 6, 2021
- Succeeded by: Arthur Peterson

Personal details
- Born: Proctor, Vermont
- Party: Democratic
- Education: University of California, Los Angeles; University of Vermont
- Website: davepottervt.com

David Potter is an American politician from Vermont. He was a Democratic member of the Vermont House of Representatives.

== Biography ==
Potter is a Vietnam War veteran and taught at Rutland High School. He is a candidate in the 2026 Vermont House of Representatives election.

== See also ==
- Members of the Vermont House of Representatives, 2005–06 session
- Members of the Vermont House of Representatives, 2007–08 session
