= Shap Smith =

American politician

92nd Speaker of the Vermont House of Representatives
- In office January 8, 2009 – January 4, 2017
- Governor: Peter Shumlin
- Preceded by: Gaye Symington
- Succeeded by: Mitzi Johnson

Member of the Vermont House of Representatives from the Lamoille-Washington 1 district
- In office January 9, 2003 – January 2017
- Preceded by: None (new district created)

Personal details
- Born: December 16, 1965 (age 60) Danbury, Connecticut, U.S.
- Party: Democratic
- Spouse: Melissa Volansky
- Education: University of Vermont; Indiana University Bloomington

Shapleigh "Shap" Smith Jr. (born December 16, 1965) is an American politician who served as the 92nd Speaker of the Vermont House of Representatives.

In August 2015 Smith announced his candidacy for the 2016 Democratic nomination for Governor of Vermont. In November he suspended his campaign, citing the need to spend time with his wife after she was diagnosed with breast cancer. After his wife's health improved, he considered reentering the gubernatorial race but did not think he could raise the required funds in time, so he entered the race for Lieutenant Governor of Vermont instead. He announced his candidacy in May 2016, and finished second to David Zuckerman in the Democratic primary.

== Biography ==
Smith graduated from the University of Vermont (B.A., 1987), and is a member of the Phi Delta Theta fraternity. He also attended the Indiana University Bloomington School of Law (J.D., cum laude, 1991). He is an attorney and shareholder with the law firm of Dinse, Knapp & McAndrew, P.C. in Burlington.

Smith, a Democrat, was first elected to the Vermont House in 2002. He represented the Lamoille-Washington 1 District, which includes the Towns of Elmore and Morristown in Lamoille County and Woodbury and Worcester in Washington County.

Early in his House career he was a member of the Ways & Means and Joint Fiscal Committees. On December 6, 2008, House Democrats, who held a 95–48 majority, nominated Smith to be the next Speaker of the Vermont House. He was elected Speaker on January 8, 2009, and was re-elected on January 5, 2011, January 8, 2013, and January 7, 2015.

On August 20, 2015, Smith announced his candidacy for the 2016 Democratic nomination for governor. In November he withdrew, following his wife's breast cancer diagnosis. Smith indicated in his withdrawal announcement that he was ending his campaign in order to spend more time with his wife during her treatment.

Smith announced in May 2016 that he would be a candidate for Lieutenant Governor of Vermont, citing his wife's improved health and a desire to continue a career in public service. A few days before the August 9 primary, he earned the endorsement of former Vermont Governor Howard Dean. Smith finished second in the Democratic primary, losing to Democrat/Progressive David Zuckerman, who had been endorsed by Senator Bernie Sanders.

== Personal life ==
Smith resides in Morristown with his wife, Melissa Volansky, and his two children.
