= Windham-4 Vermont Representative District, 2002–2012 =

Coordinates: 43°7′N 72°35′W

The Windham-4 Representative District is a two-member state Representative district in the U.S. state of Vermont. It is one of the 108 one or two member districts into which the state was divided by the redistricting and reapportionment plan developed by the Vermont General Assembly following the 2000 U.S. census. The plan applies to legislatures elected in 2002, 2004, 2006, 2008, and 2010. A new plan was developed in 2012 following the 2010 United States census.

== Layout and demographics ==
The Windham-4 District includes all of the Windham County towns of Athens, Brookline, Grafton, Rockingham, and Windham, and a portion of the town of Westminster defined as follows:

that part of Westminster encompassed within a boundary beginning at the intersection of the Rockingham town line with Interstate 91; then southeasterly along the centerline of Interstate 91 to the intersection with the Saxtons River; then easterly along the centerline of the Saxtons River until the intersection with Saxtons River Road (Vt 121); then southeasterly along the centerline of Saxtons River Road until the intersection with Church Avenue; this easterly along the centerline of Church Avenue until the intersection with Saxtons River Road; then northerly along the centerline of Saxtons River Road until the intersection of Forest Road; then southerly along the centerline of Forest Road to the intersection with the Saxtons River; then northeasterly along the centerline of the Saxtons River to the intersection with the Connecticut River.

— Vermont Statutes, Title 17, Chapter 34, Section 1893

The rest of the town of Westminster is in Windham-5.

As of the 2000 census, the state as a whole had a population of 608,827. As there are a total of 150 representatives, there were 4,059 residents per representative (or 8,118 residents per two representatives). The two member Windham-4 District had a population of 7,427 in that same census, 8.51% below the state average.

== District representatives ==
- Leslie Goldman, Democrat
- Carolyn W. Partridge, Democrat

== See also ==
- Members of the Vermont House of Representatives, 2005-2006 session
- Vermont Representative Districts, 2002-2012
