= Lamoille-1 Vermont Representative District, 2002–2012 =

Coordinates: 44°29′N 72°43′W

The Lamoille-1 Representative District is a one-member state Representative district in the U.S. state of Vermont. It is one of the 108 one or two member districts into which the state was divided by the redistricting and reapportionment plan developed by the Vermont General Assembly following the 2000 United States census. The plan applies to legislatures elected in 2002, 2004, 2006, 2008, and 2010. A new plan will be developed in 2012 following the 2010 United States census.

The Lamoille-1 District includes all of the Lamoille County town of Stowe.

As of the 2000 census, the state as a whole had a population of 608,827. As there are a total of 150 representatives, there were 4,059 residents per representative (or 8,118 residents per two representatives). The one member Lamoille-1 District had a population of 4,339 in that same census, 6.9% above the state average.

== District representatives ==
- Jed Lipsky, Independent (as of May 2026)

== See also ==
- Members of the Vermont House of Representatives, 2005-2006 session
- Vermont Representative Districts, 2002-2012
