= Duncan F. Kilmartin =

American politician

Duncan Frey Kilmartin (born 1942) is a Republican politician who was elected and currently serves in the Vermont House of Representatives. He represents the Orleans-2 Representative District.
