= Joseph L. Krawczyk Jr. =

American politician

Member of the Vermont House of Representatives from the Bennington 2-1 district
- In office January 8, 2003 – January 5, 2011
- Preceded by: Jim Colvin
- Succeeded by: Brian Campion

Personal details
- Born: Joseph Louis Krawczyk Jr. December 24, 1947 (age 78) Bennington, Vermont, U.S.
- Party: Republican
- Spouse: Claire
- Education: Colorado State University Pueblo (BS); Naval War College (MA)

Military service
- Allegiance: United States
- Branch/service: United States Army
- Years of service: 1967–1994
- Rank: Colonel
- Battles/wars: Vietnam War
- Awards: Silver Star Medal; Bronze Star Medal (4); Purple Heart (2)

Joseph Louis Krawczyk Jr. (born December 24, 1947) is a Republican politician who was elected and served in the Vermont House of Representatives. He represented the Bennington-2-1 Representative District but was defeated in 2010 by a Democrat, Brian Campion. His cousin, Albert Krawczyk, served in the House from 1999 to 2005.

Vermont House of Representatives
Preceded by Jim Colvin	Vermont Representative from the Bennington 2-1 District; 2003–2011; Served alongside: Timothy Corcoran II	Succeeded by Brian Campion
