= Windsor-6-1 Vermont Representative District, 2002–2012 =

Coordinates: 43°42′N 72°30′W

The Windsor-6-1 Representative District is a one-member state Representative district in the U.S. state of Vermont. It is one of the 108 one or two member districts into which the state was divided by the redistricting and reapportionment plan developed by the Vermont General Assembly following the 2000 U.S. census. The plan applies to legislatures elected in 2002, 2004, 2006, 2008, and 2010. A new plan will be developed in 2012 following the 2010 United States census.

The Windsor-6-1 District includes all of the Windsor County towns of Barnard and Pomfret, as well as a part of the town of Hartford:

lying westerly and northerly of a boundary beginning on the Norwich-Hartford town line at the centerline of Newton Lane, then southerly along the centerline of Newton Lane to its intersection with Jericho Street, then westerly along the centerline of Jericho Street to its intersection with Dothan Road, then southerly along the centerline of Dothan Road to VT 14, then westerly along the centerline of VT 14 to the intersection of the centerline of Runnels Road and VT 14, then at a right angle to a utility pole marked 137T/6 ET&T/3>/136/GMP Corp/156/40030 on the south edge of VT 14, then southerly in a straight line across the White River to the junction of Old River Road and the beginning of Costello Road, then southerly and easterly along the center of Costello Road to its end on U.S. Route 4, then westerly along the centerline of U.S. Route 4 to the intersection of Waterman Hill Road, then northerly along the centerline of Waterman Hill Road to the northerly low watermark of the Ottauquechee River, then westerly and southerly along the northerly and westerly low watermark of the Ottauquechee River to the Hartford-Hartland town line, then westerly along the town line to the northerly low watermark of the Ottauquechee River, then along the northerly low watermark of the Ottauquechee River to the Hartford-Pomfret town line.

— Vermont Statutes, Title 17, Chapter 34, Section 1893a

The rest of the town of Hartford is in Windsor-6-2.

As of the 2000 census, the state as a whole had a population of 608,827. As there are a total of 150 representatives, there were 4,059 residents per representative (or 8,118 residents per two representatives). The one member Windsor-6-1 District had a population of 4,224 in that same census, 4.07% above the state average.

== District representative ==
- Michael S. Reese, Democrat

== See also ==
- Members of the Vermont House of Representatives, 2005-2006 session
- Vermont Representative Districts, 2002-2012
