= Patty O'Donnell =

American politician

Patricia A. "Patty" O'Donnell (born October 15, 1954) is an American Republican politician in Vermont. She was a member of the Vermont House of Representatives from 1998 to 2010.

== Biography ==
O'Donnell was born in Holyoke, Massachusetts and attended Holyoke Community College. She served as a board member on the Vernon School Board in Vernon, Vermont from 1997 until 1999. In 1999 she was Chairperson of the School Board.

In 1998 O'Donnell was elected to the Vermont House of Representatives, She represented the Windham-1 Representative District and served in the State House until 2010. She served on the Appropriations and Human Services Committees in the State House.

O'Donnell was reelected in 2010 as a board member on the Vernon School Board. She works with "Brattleboro Retreat", a not-for-profit, mental health and addictions treatment center founded in 1834.

O'Donnell and her husband Robert reside in Vernon, Vermont. They have four children and six grandchildren.
