= Dennis Devereux =

American politician

Dennis J. Devereux (born March 10, 1951) is an American politician who served as a member of the Vermont House of Representatives for the Windsor-Rutland-1 representative district from 2007 to 2019.
