= Jeff Wilson (Vermont politician) =

American politician

Jeff Wilson is an American politician from the state of Vermont. A member of the Democratic Party, he represented the Bennington-4 district in the Vermont House of Representatives from 2008 to 2015.
