= Bennington-2-2 Vermont Representative District, 2002–2012 =

Coordinates: 42°52′N 73°11′W

The Bennington-2-2 Representative District is a two-member state Representative district in the U.S. state of Vermont. It is one of the 108 one or two member districts into which the state was divided by the redistricting and reapportionment plan developed by the Vermont General Assembly following the 2000 U.S. census. The plan applies to legislatures elected in 2002, 2004, 2006, 2008, and 2010. A new plan will be developed in 2012 following the 2010 U.S. census.

The Bennington-2-2 District includes part of the Bennington County town of Bennington defined as follows:

[t]hat portion of the town of Bennington encompassed by a border beginning at the intersection of VT 7 and the Pownal town line, then northerly on the easterly side of VT 7 to the intersection with Monument Avenue, then northerly along the easterly side of Monument Avenue to the intersection with Dewey Street, then northerly along the easterly side of Dewey Street to the intersection with West Main Street, then southeasterly on the southerly side of West Main Street to the intersection with North Street, then northerly along the easterly side of North Street to the intersection with County Street, then easterly along the southerly side of County Street to the intersection with Park Street, then northerly along the easterly side of Park Street to the intersection with Roaring Branch River, then easterly along the southerly side of the river to the intersection with VT 9, then easterly along VT 9 to the intersection with the Bennington-Woodford town line, then southerly along the westerly side of the Bennington-Woodford town line to the intersection with the Bennington-Pownal town line, then westerly along the northerly side of the Bennington-Pownal town line to the point of beginning.(Vermont Statutes, Title 17, Chapter 34, Section 1893a)

The remainder of the town is in Bennington-2-1.

As of the 2000 census, the state as a whole had a population of 608,827. As there are a total of 150 representatives, there were 4,059 residents per representative (or 8,118 residents per two representatives). The two member Bennington-2-2 District had a population of 7,798 in that same census, 3.94% below the state average.

== District representatives ==
- Anne H. Mook, Democrat
- Mary A. Morrissey, Republican

== See also ==
- Members of the Vermont House of Representatives, 2005-2006 session
- Vermont Representative Districts, 2002-2012
