= Rutland-1-1 Vermont Representative District, 2002–2012 =

Coordinates: 43°31′50″N 73°11′30″W

The Rutland-1-1 Representative District is a one-member state Representative district in the U.S. state of Vermont. It is one of the 108 one or two member districts into which the state was divided by the redistricting and reapportionment plan developed by the Vermont General Assembly following the 2000 U.S. census. The plan applies to legislatures elected in 2002, 2004, 2006, 2008, and 2010. A new plan will be developed in 2012 following the 2010 U.S. census.

The Rutland-1-1 District includes all of the Rutland County town of Poultney and part of the town of Ira, defined as follows:

that part of the town of Ira encompassed within a boundary beginning in the southwest at the intersection of the town boundaries of Ira, Middletown Springs and Poultney, then northerly along the boundary with Poultney and continuing northerly along the boundary with Castleton, then easterly along the boundary with Castleton to the boundary with West Rutland, then southeasterly along the boundary with West Rutland to the ridge line of the mountain range, then southwesterly along the ridge line of the mountain range to the boundary with Middletown Springs, then westerly along the boundary with Middletown Springs to the point of beginning.

— Vermont Statutes, Title 17, Chapter 34, Section 1893a

The rest of Ira is in Rutland-1-2.

As of the 2000 census, the state as a whole had a population of 608,827. As there are a total of 150 representatives, there were 4,059 residents per representative (or 8,118 residents per two representatives). The one member Rutland-1-1 District had a population of 3,752 in that same census, 7.56% below the state average.

== District representative ==
- Andrew P. Donaghy, Republican

== See also ==
- Members of the Vermont House of Representatives, 2005-2006 session
- Vermont Representative Districts, 2002-2012
