= Windsor-1-1 Vermont Representative District, 2002–2012 =

Coordinates: 43°18′N 72°39′W

The Windsor-1-1 Representative District is a one-member state Representative district in the U.S. state of Vermont. It is one of the 108 one- or two-member districts into which the state was divided by the redistricting and reapportionment plan developed by the Vermont General Assembly following the 2000 U.S. census. The plan applies to legislatures elected in 2002, 2004, 2006, 2008, and 2010. A new plan will be developed in 2012 following the 2010 United States census.

The Windsor-1-1 District includes all of the Windsor County towns of Andover, Baltimore, and Chester, as well as part of the town of Springfield:

encompassed within a boundary beginning at the Chester-Springfield town lines at Northfield Drive, then easterly along the centerline of Northfield Drive to the intersection with Fairbanks Road, then northerly along the centerline of Fairbanks Road to the intersection with Main Street, North Springfield, then easterly along the centerline of Main Street, North Springfield to the intersection with the County Road, then northeasterly along the centerline of the County Road to the intersection with VT 106, then northwesterly along the centerline of VT 106 to the intersection with the Baltimore Road, then northwesterly along the centerline of the Baltimore Road to the Chester boundary line, then southerly along the Chester boundary line to the point of the beginning.

— Vermont Statutes, Title 17, Chapter 34, Section 1893a

The rest of the town of Springfield is in Windsor-1-2.

As of the 2000 census, the state as a whole had a population of 608,827. As there are a total of 150 representatives, there were 4,059 residents per representative (or 8,118 residents per two representatives). The one member Windsor-1-1 District had a population of 3,912 in that same census, 3.62% below the state average.

== District representative ==
- Kathy Pellett, Democrat

== See also ==
- Members of the Vermont House of Representatives, 2005-2006 session
- Vermont Representative Districts, 2002-2012
