= Chittenden-8 Vermont Representative District, 2002–2012 =

State Representative district in Vermont, U.S.

Coordinates: 44°29′N 72°53′W

The Chittenden-8 Representative District is a two-member state Representative district in the U.S. state of Vermont. It is one of the 108 one or two member districts into which the state was divided by the redistricting and reapportionment plan developed by the Vermont General Assembly following the 2000 United States census. The plan applies to legislatures elected in 2002, 2004, 2006, 2008, and 2010. A new plan will be developed in 2012 following the 2010 United States census.

The Chittenden-8 District consists of the Chittenden County towns of Bolton, Jericho, and Underhill.

As of the 2000 census, the state as a whole had a population of 608,827. As there are a total of 150 representatives, there were 4,059 residents per representative (or 8,118 residents per two representatives). The two member Chittenden-8 District had a population of 8,966 in that same census, 10.45% above the state average. It has the highest population of any House of Representatives district in the state.

== History ==
From 1996 to 2009, the district was represented by Gaye R. Symington, who was the Speaker of the Vermont House of Representatives from 2005 to 2009. She was later the Vermont Democratic Party's Gubernatorial nominee in the 2008 Election, in which she placed third, behind incumbent Republican Jim Douglas and union and Progressive Party-backed independent Anthony Pollina. She was replaced by physician George W. Till, who won the 8th's 2008 election.

== District representatives ==
- William R. Frank, Democrat
- George W. Till, Democrat

== See also ==
- Members of the Vermont House of Representatives, 2005-2006 session
- Vermont Representative Districts, 2002-2012
