= Windham-2 Vermont Representative District, 2002–2012 =

Vermont House of Representatives district

Coordinates: 42°49′N 72°49′W

The Windham-2 Representative District is a one-member state Representative district in the U.S. state of Vermont. It is one of the 108 one or two member districts into which the state was divided by the redistricting and reapportionment plan developed by the Vermont General Assembly following the 2000 United States census. The plan applies to legislatures elected in 2002, 2004, 2006, 2008, and 2010. A new plan will be developed in 2012 following the 2010 United States census.

The Windham-2 District includes all of the Windham County towns of Halifax, Whitingham, and Wilmington.

As of the 2000 census, the state as a whole had a population of 608,827. As there are a total of 150 representatives, there were 4,059 residents per representative (or 8,118 residents per two representatives). The one member Windham-2 District had a population of 4,305 in that same census, 6.06% above the state average.

== District representative ==
- Robert Rusten, Democrat
- Ann Manwaring, Democrat

== See also ==
- Members of the Vermont House of Representatives, 2005-2006 session
- Vermont Representative Districts, 2002-2012
