= Chittenden-7-1 Vermont Representative District, 2002–2012 =

State Representative district in Vermont, U.S.

Coordinates: 44°33′N 73°10′W

The Chittenden-7-1 Representative District is a two-member state Representative district in the U.S. state of Vermont. It is one of the 108 one or two member districts into which the state was divided by the redistricting and reapportionment plan developed by the Vermont General Assembly following the 2000 U.S. census. The plan applies to legislatures elected in 2002, 2004, 2006, 2008, and 2010. A new plan will be developed in 2012 following the 2010 U.S. census.

The Chittenden-7-1 District includes part of the Chittenden County town of Colchester defined as follows:

That portion of the town of Colchester north of Malletts Creek and west of Interstate 89 to the Milton town line, plus that portion of the town of Colchester east of Interstate 89.

— Vermont Statutes, Title 17, Chapter 34, Section 1893a

The rest of Colchester is in Chittenden-7-2.

As of the 2000 census, the state as a whole had a population of 608,827. As there are a total of 150 representatives, there were 4,059 residents per representative (or 8,118 residents per two representatives). The two member Chittenden-7-1 District had a population of 8,903 in that same census, 9.67% above the state average.

== District representatives ==
- Jim Condon, Democrat
- Malcolm F. Severance, Republican

== See also ==
- Members of the Vermont House of Representatives, 2005-2006 session
- Vermont Representative Districts, 2002-2012
