= Bennington-5 Vermont Representative District, 2002–2012 =

Coordinates: 43°6′40″N 73°9′0″W

The Bennington-5 Representative District is a one-member state Representative district in the U.S. state of Vermont. It is one of the 108 one or two member districts into which the state was divided by the redistricting and reapportionment plan developed by the Vermont General Assembly following the 2000 United States census. The plan applies to legislatures elected in 2002, 2004, 2006, 2008, and 2010. A new plan will be developed in 2012 following the 2010 United States census.

The Bennington-5 District includes all of the Bennington County towns of Arlington, Sandgate, and Sunderland, as well as:

...that part of Rupert encompassed within a boundary beginning at the intersection of the New York state line with VT 153; then northeasterly along the centerline of VT 153 to the intersection with East Street; then easterly along the centerline of East Street to the intersection with Kent Hollow Road; then southerly along the centerline of Kent Hollow Road to the Sandgate town line. (Vermont Statutes, Title 17, Chapter 34, Section 1893)

The rest of Rupert is in Rutland-8.

As of the 2000 census, the state as a whole had a population of 608,827. As there are a total of 150 representatives, there were 4,059 residents per representative (or 8,118 residents per two representatives). The one member Bennington-5 District had a population of 3,718 in that same census, 8.4% below the state average.

== District representative ==
2005-2006

- Lawrence E. Molloy, Democrat

2007-2008

- Cynthia Browning, Democrat

== See also ==
- Members of the Vermont House of Representatives, 2005-2006 session
- Vermont Representative Districts, 2002-2012
