= Chittenden-5-1 Vermont Representative District, 2002–2012 =

State Representative district in Vermont, U.S.

Coordinates: 44°22′50″N 73°13′50″W

The Chittenden-5-1 Representative District is a one-member state Representative district in the U.S. state of Vermont. It was one of the 108 one- or two-member districts into which the state was divided by the redistricting and reapportionment plan developed by the Vermont General Assembly following the 2000 U.S. census. The plan applied to legislatures elected in 2002, 2004, 2006, 2008, and 2010. A new plan was developed in 2012 following the 2010 U.S. census, retaining a district designated as Chittenden-5-1.

The Chittenden-5-1 District includes a section of the Chittenden County town of Shelburne defined as follows:

That portion of the town of Shelburne bounded by a line beginning on the southwest corner of the Shelburne-Charlotte town line, then following the shore of Lake Champlain to the mouth of Munroe Brook, including all of the Lake that is part of the town of Shelburne, then upstream along the center of Munroe Brook to the intersection with Spear Street, then south along the centerline of Spear Street to the Shelburne-Charlotte town line, then west along the Shelburne-Charlotte town line to the place of beginning.

— Vermont Statutes, Title 17, Chapter 34, Section 1893a

The remainder of Shelburne is in Chittenden-5-2.

As of the 2000 census, the state as a whole had a population of 608,827. As there are a total of 150 representatives, there were 4,059 residents per representative (or 8,118 residents per two representatives). The one member Chittenden-5-1 District had a population of 3,866 in that same census, 4.75% below the state average.

== District representative (as of 2013) ==
- Kathryn Webb, Democrat

== See also ==
- Members of the Vermont House of Representatives, 2005-2006 session
- Vermont Representative Districts, 2002-2012
