= Chittenden-1-2 Vermont Representative District, 2002–2012 =

State Representative district in Vermont, U.S.

Coordinates: 44°18′55″N 73°13′25″W

== District representative ==
- Mike Yantachka, Democrat

== See also ==
- Members of the Vermont House of Representatives, 2005-2006 session
- Vermont Representative Districts, 2002-2012
