= Leigh Larocque =

American politician

Leigh B. Larocque

Member of the Vermont House of Representatives from the Caledonia 3-1 district
- In office January, 1993 – January 1997
- Preceded by: Elmer L. Faris
- Succeeded by: Jennifer Nelson

Member of the Vermont House of Representatives from the Caledonia 3 (1998-2000) district and Caledonia 1 (2002-2014) district
- In office January, 1999 – January 2015
- Preceded by: Jennifer Nelson
- Succeeded by: Marcia Robinson Martel

Personal details
- Born: Leigh Bertrand Larocque; March 6, 1934 Brownington, Vermont, U.S.
- Died: March 26, 2017 (aged 83) Barnet, Vermont, U.S.
- Party: Republican
- Spouse: Beverly Goodwin
- Occupation: Farming, Construction

Leigh Bertrand Larocque (March 6, 1934 – March 26, 2017) was a Republican politician who served in the Vermont House of Representatives. He represented the Caledonia-1 Representative District from 1992 to 1996 and again from 1998 to 2015.

== Early life and career ==
Larocque was born in Brownington, Vermont, the son of dairy farmer Donald O. Larocque, Sr. (1905–1996) and Beatrice Labor (1905–1992).

Larocque received his Certificate from Saint Johnsbury Trade School in St. Johnsbury, Vermont in 1952.

From 1956 to 1961, Larocque worked on the Saint Lawrence Seaway, Niagara Falls Power Project, and Moore Dam in Waterford, Vermont as a Project Inspector for Uhl, Hall and Rich, an engineering consulting firm. After leaving the field of engineering, Larocque then became owner and operator of his own dairy farm from 1962 to 1986. After selling the family farm, he worked for Charles Fenoff Redi-Mix from 1987 to 1995 as a Concrete Mix Plant Operator, and a Concrete and Soils Technician for Ebasco Services.

Larocque was Chair of the Barnet Selectboard from 1988 to 2002.
