= Joe Acinapura =

Republican politician (born 1938)

Joseph N. Acinapura (born 13 May 1938, in Union City, New Jersey) is a Republican politician who served in the Vermont House of Representatives. He represents the Rutland-7 Representative District.

== Early life, education and military service ==
Acinapura graduated from Union Hill High School in New Jersey in 1956. He received a bachelor of arts in mathematics from Rutgers University in 1960 and a master of arts in political science from the University of Colorado in 1970. He served as an officer in the United States Army. While in the army, he was a computer programmer, was stationed at the North American Air Defense Command in Colorado, and served in Vietnam. He attended the Naval War College. He retired as a colonel.

== Political experience ==
Acinapura was appointed to the Vermont House of Representatives on November 16, 2005, and subsequently served as a Representative from 2005 to 2012. He served as Chair of the Vermont Republican Party from 2003 to 2004. In 1996, he was a candidate for the Vermont State Senate in the Addison District 1. Earlier in his civic career, he served as a Selectman from 1991 to 1993 and as Chair of the Brandon Select Board from 1991 to 1992.

== Professional experience ==
Acinapura served in the United States Army from 1961 to 1989. He worked as a high school teacher in 1960–1961, and later as a professor at the College of St. Joseph from 1992 to 1997. He also served as a basketball coach for the Rutland Northeast Supervisory Union from 2000 to 2005, as Auditor for the Brandon Fire District from 2003 to 2005, and as Chair of the Vermont Parole Board in 2005.

== Personal life ==
Acinapura is married to Lois and together they have two children named Lauren and Jeanne. He is a Catholic.
