= Judith Livingston =

American lawyer (born 1955)

Judith A. "Judy" Livingston (born 1955) is a trial American lawyer whose career at law firm Kramer, Dillof, Tessel, Duffy & Moore has spanned more than four decades.

Livingston grew up on Long Island, and initially intended to study sociology, then switched to law, discovering a passion for trial law while earning a J.D. degree from Hofstra University. She joined New York City law firm Kramer, Dillof, Tessel, Duffy & Moore, following her 1979 graduation, as an assistant to the office manager, then became a partner in 1989.

In 1992, Livingston became the first female and youngest member to be admitted to the exclusive Inner Circle of Advocates, an invitation-only society of top 100 American plaintiffs' lawyers in the nation. In 2022, she became the second woman to become president of the organization.

A specialist in medical malpractice, Livingston is a partner at the New York legal firm Kramer, Dillof, Livingston and Moore, and is married to Thomas Moore, who is also a law partner at the same law firm.
