= Cola Hudson =

American politician

Member of the Vermont House of Representatives
- In office January 3, 1973 – January 20, 2008
- Preceded by: John McClaughry
- Succeeded by: Howard T. Crawford
- Constituency: Caledonia-4 (1993–2008)

Personal details
- Born: Cola Howard Hudson; June 5, 1926 St. Johnsbury, Vermont
- Died: January 20, 2008 (aged 81) Lebanon, New Hampshire
- Party: Republican

Cola Howard Hudson (June 5, 1926 – January 20, 2008) was an American politician who served in the Vermont House of Representatives.
