= Bill Botzow =

American visual artist and politician

William G. F. Botzow II (born 29 September 1945, in New York City) is an American visual artist and politician.

Botzow graduated with an A.B. in art and archaeology from Princeton University in 1968 after completing an 89-page long senior thesis titled "Spatial Inquiries." He has been a resident of Pownal, Vermont since 1 January 1982.

Botzow was elected to Vermont's state House of Representatives in 2002 as a Democrat, and he continues to serve in that position as the elected member for the Bennington-1 Representative District.

Vermont House of Representatives
Preceded by Lawrence Molloy	Member of the Vermont House of Representatives from the Bennington 1st district 2003–2019	Succeeded by Nelson Brownell
