= Linda K. Myers =

American politician

Member of the Vermont House of Representatives from the Chittenden 8-1 district
- In office September 13, 2001 – 2021
- Preceded by: Martin J. Myers
- Succeeded by: Tanya Vyhovsky

Personal details
- Born: Nanty Glo, Pennsylvania
- Party: Republican
- Spouse: Martin J. Myers (deceased)
- Children: 2
- Education: Kent State University (BA)
- Profession: Newspaper editor and journalist (retired)

Linda K. Myers (born August 18, 1940) is a Republican politician in Vermont. She was a member of the Vermont House of Representatives from 2001 to 2020, representing the Chittenden-8-1 Representative District, formerly the Chittenden-6-1 Representative District.

== Biography ==
Myers was born in Nanty Glo, Pennsylvania, and was educated in the public schools of Cleveland, Ohio. She received her Bachelor of Arts in Journalism and her Bachelor of Arts in Political Science from Kent State University in 1962. Myers was the Editorial Assistant for the Electronic Industries Association (EIA), now the Electronic Industries Alliance, from 1962 to 1963. She was Editorial Assistant of the Service Employees International Union from 1963 to 1968 and worked as a free lance journalist from 1968 to 1984. Myers moved to Essex, Vermont in 1978, and served as Managing Editor of "The Essex Reporter" from 1984 to 2001.

Myers has served on the Essex Selectboard since 2001 and is a Justice of the Peace. She is a former cheerleading coach at Essex High School, and has been involved in cheerleading on the local, state and national levels for twenty-five years. She was named high school cheerleading's "National Contributor of the Year" by the National Federation of State High School Association's Spirit Committee in 2003.

She was appointed to the Vermont House of Representatives in 2001 after the death of her husband, Representative Martin J. Myers. She has been elected as a Republican candidate to the State House since 2003. She is a member of the Administrative Rules Committee and the House Committee on Appropriations. She is also a member of the Judicial Nominating Board. Previously, she was the Vice Chair of the House Corrections and Institutions Committee.

Myers resides in Essex, Vermont. She and her late husband have two daughters, Robyn and Kasey and two sons-in-law, Scott and Mark.
