= Bennington-2-1 Vermont Representative District, 2002–2012 =

Coordinates: 42°54′0″N 73°13′30″W

The Bennington-2-1 Representative District is a two-member state Representative district in the U.S. state of Vermont. It is one of the 108 one or two member districts into which the state was divided by the redistricting and reapportionment plan developed by the Vermont General Assembly following the 2000 United States census. The plan applies to legislatures elected in 2002, 2004, 2006, 2008, and 2010. A new plan will be developed in 2012 following the 2010 United States census.

The Bennington-2-1 District includes part of the Bennington County town of Bennington. The Vermont Statutes (Title 17, 1893a) defines the district as "That portion of the town of Bennington not included in Bennington-2-2".

As of the 2000 census, the state as a whole had a population of 608,827. As there are a total of 150 representatives, there were 4,059 residents per representative (or 8,118 residents per two representatives). The two member Bennington-2-1 District had a population of 7,939 in that same census, 2.2% below the state average.

== District representatives ==
- Timothy R. Corcoran II, Democrat
- Brian Campion, Democrat

== See also ==
- Members of the Vermont House of Representatives, 2005-2006 session
- Vermont Representative Districts, 2002-2012
