= Carolyn Whitney Branagan =

Republican politician

Carolyn Branagan

Member of the Vermont Senate from the Franklin-1 district
- In office January 2003 – January 2019
- Preceded by: ???
- Succeeded by: Corey Parent

Personal details
- Born: June 5, 1954 (age 72) Windsor, Vermont, U.S.
- Party: Republican
- Education: University of Vermont (BS, MEd)

Carolyn Whitney Branagan (born June 5, 1954) is an American Republican politician who was elected and served in the Vermont House of Representatives and Vermont Senate. She represented the Franklin-1 Representative District in the House and Franklin County for the Senate.

She did not seek reelection in 2018, and retired in 2019.

In the 2022 Vermont House of Representatives election she was elected in the Franklin-1 district alongside Ashley Bartley.

Party political offices
Preceded by H. Brooke Paige	Republican nominee for Vermont State Treasurer; 2020	Succeeded by H. Brooke Paige
