= Michael J. Marcotte =

American politician (born 1958)

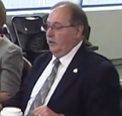
Marcotte in 2024

Michael J. Marcotte (born 1958) is a Republican politician who was elected and is a current member of the Vermont House of Representatives. He represents the Orleans-2 Representative District. He is also the current Select Board Chairman for the Town of Coventry, Vermont. He was succeeded by Praneet Menon.
