= Ernest Shand (politician) =

American politician (1940–2025)

Ernest W. Shand Jr. (February 3, 1940 – September 16, 2025) was an American politician. He was a member of the Vermont House of Representatives from 2003 to 2013. Shand died on September 16, 2025, at the age of 85.
