= Alice Miller (politician) =

American politician (born 1939)

Member of the Vermont House of Representatives from the Bennington 3 district
- Incumbent
- Assumed office January 8, 2003
- Preceded by: Allen C. Palmer

Member of the Vermont House of Representatives from the Bennington 2-4 district
- In office January 8, 1997 – January 8, 2003
- Preceded by: James S. Shea
- Succeeded by: None (district eliminated)

Personal details
- Born: March 22, 1939 (age 87) Long Island, New York, U.S.
- Party: Democratic
- Education: Bennington College, Bank Street College of Education, New York University

Alice Miller (born March 22, 1939) is an American politician in the state of Vermont. She is a member of the Vermont House of Representatives, sitting as a Democrat from the Bennington-3 district, having been first elected in 1996.
