= Ira Trombley =

American legislator and politician

Ira Trombley (April 16, 1952 – December 20, 2009) was a Vermont legislator and politician. Trombley served in the Vermont House of Representatives from 2002 until his death.
