= Betty Nuovo =

American attorney and politician (1931–2023)

Member of the Vermont House of Representatives from the Addison-1 district 1981-1990
- In office January 8, 1997 – 2017
- Succeeded by: Robin Scheu

Personal details
- Born: December 10, 1931 Englewood, New Jersey, U.S.
- Died: July 4, 2023 (aged 91)
- Party: Democratic
- Profession: Attorney

Betty A. Nuovo (December 20, 1931 – July 4, 2023) was an American attorney and Democratic politician. She was a member of the Vermont House of Representatives from the Addison-1 District from 1981 to 1990 and from 1996 to 2017.

Nuovo’s involvement in state and local politics dated back to 1962, during the Kennedy administration. She and her husband, Victor, moved to Middlebury from New Brunswick, New Jersey, when Victor joined the faculty of Middlebury College’s Philosophy Department.

In Middlebury, Betty Nuovo joined the Addison County League of Women Voters. She was particularly interested in boosting women’s rights and ensuring equal pay in the workplace.

Her eventual positions included the Middlebury Democratic Committee, town selectboard, Addison County Regional Planning Commission, Middlebury charter committee, Middlebury Planning Commission, Addison County Chamber of Commerce board and Addison County Economic Development Corp. board.

Nuovo died on July 4, 2023, at the age of 91.
