= Janet Ancel =

American politician and member of the Vermont State House of Representatives

Member of the Vermont House of Representatives from the Washington 6 district
- In office January 2005 – January 2023

Personal details
- Party: Democratic
- Children: 2
- Education: Stanford University (BA in English), University of Denver (MSW, JD)

Janet Ancel is an American politician from Calais, Vermont who served in the Vermont House of Representatives from 2005 to 2023.

== Political career ==
In 2011, Janet Ancel was appointed to serve as Chair of the House Committee on Ways and Means, the first woman to hold that position in Vermont. She also served on the Joint Fiscal Committee, the Vermont Emergency Board, the Joint Legislative Management Committee, the Joint Transportation Oversight Committee, and the Legislative Advisory Committee on the State House. She was also a member of the NCSL Task Force on State and Local Tax and is currently a Trustee of the Vermont Historical Society and a Justice of the Peace for the town of Calais.

Prior to becoming a Representative, Ancel served as Legal Counsel to Governor Howard Dean from 1993 to 2000 and as Vermont Tax Commissioner from 2000 to 2002.

She is the daughter of Lorie Tarshis and Elizabeth Gay, and the grand-daughter of Louise Andrews Kent https://en.wikipedia.org/wiki/Louise_Andrews_Kent.
