= Orleans-1 Vermont Representative District, 2002–2012 =

Coordinates: 44°55′N 72°3′W

The Orleans-1 Representative District is a two-member state Representative district in the U.S. state of Vermont. It is one of the 108 one or two member districts into which the state was divided by the redistricting and reapportionment plan developed by the Vermont General Assembly following the 2000 United States census. The plan applies to legislatures elected in 2002, 2004, 2006, 2008, and 2010. A new plan will be developed in 2012 following the 2010 United States census.

The Orleans-1 District includes all of the Orleans County towns of Brownington, Charleston, Derby, Holland, and Morgan.

As of the 2000 census, the state as a whole had a population of 608,827. As there are a total of 150 representatives, there were 4,059 residents per representative (or 8,118 residents per two representatives). The two member Orleans-1 District had a population of 7,641 in that same census, 5.88% below the state average.

== District representatives ==
- Robert Lewis, Republican, Lewis was appointed by Governor Jim Douglas to serve out the remainder of Loren Shaw's term and was then elected in November 2008.
- Scott Wheeler, Republican, Wheeler was reelected in November 2008.

== See also ==
- Members of the Vermont House of Representatives, 2005-2006 session
- Vermont Representative Districts, 2002-2012
