= Jim McCullough =

American politician and member of the Vermont State House of Representatives

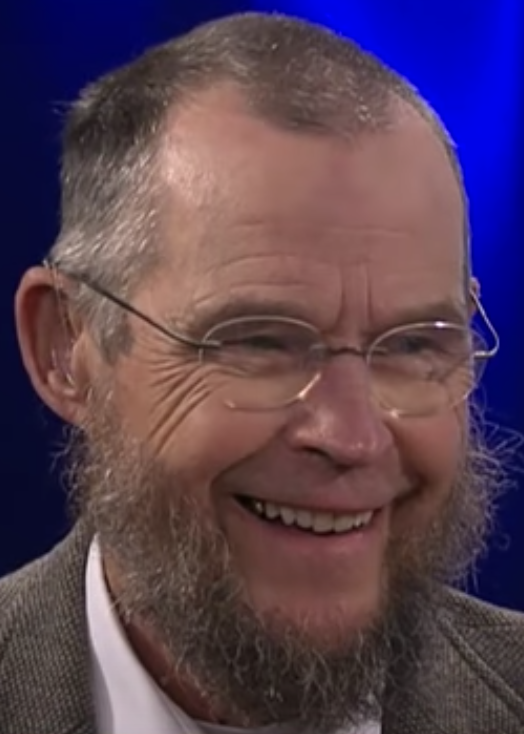
- McCullough in 2018

Member of the Vermont House of Representatives from the Chittenden-2 District
- Incumbent
- Assumed office 2002

Personal details
- Born: Burlington, Vermont, U.S.
- Party: Democratic
- Children: 3
- Education: University of Vermont (BS)

Jim McCullough is an American politician who has served in the Vermont House of Representatives since 2002.
