= Willem Jewett =

American politician (1963–2022)

Member of the Vermont House of Representatives from the Addison 2nd district
- In office January 7, 2003 – 2017
- Succeeded by: Peter Conlon

Personal details
- Born: August 23, 1963 New Rochelle, New York, U.S.
- Died: January 12, 2022 (aged 58) Ripton, Vermont, U.S.

Willem Westpalm von Hoorn Jewett (August 23, 1963 – January 12, 2022) was an American Democratic politician. He was a member of the Vermont House of Representatives from the Addison's 2nd District, being first elected in 2002. Jewett served as the Assistant House Majority Leader during the 2011–12 session and as the House Majority Leader during the 2013–14 session. He served as the vice-chair of House Judiciary during the 2015–16 session.

After leaving the legislature, Jewett was diagnosed with mucosal melanoma. He died using medical aide in dying on January 12, 2022, at the age of 58. During his life, he helped to pass a state law allowing the terminally ill to end their lives in this manner.

Jewett was born in New Rochelle, New York. He graduated from Bowdoin College and received his law degree from Lewis & Clark College. He was admitted to the Vermont bar and lived in Ripton, Vermont. He served on the Ripton School board.
