= John A. McMullen =

American lawyer (born 1941)

John A. "Jack" McMullen

Personal details
- Born: December 10, 1941 (age 84) Queens, New York, U.S.
- Party: Republican
- Education: Columbia University (BS); Harvard University (JD, MBA)
- Profession: Businessman

Military service
- Allegiance: United States
- Branch/service: United States Navy
- Years of service: 1964–1969
- Rank: Lieutenant
- Unit: Staff of Admiral Hyman G. Rickover, Naval Reactors

John A. McMullen, known as Jack McMullen, (born December 10, 1941) is an American businessman and former politician. He is most notable for his unsuccessful runs for U.S. Senator in 1998, and again in 2004, as well as his unsuccessful candidacy for Vermont Attorney General in 2012.

== Early life ==
Jack McMullen was born in Queens, New York on December 10, 1941, and raised on Staten Island. He graduated from Columbia University with a B.S. degree in applied physics and electronics engineering in 1964, and was a member of Phi Beta Kappa.

== Military service ==
McMullen served in the United States Navy from 1964 to 1969. Assigned to the staff of Admiral Hyman G. Rickover, the head of the Navy's nuclear submarine program, McMullen attained the rank of lieutenant as manager of a program that upgraded the service's nuclear-powered submarines with modernized reactors. He then pursued post-graduate education, and completed an MBA at Harvard Business School (with High Distinction) in 1972, and a J.D. from Harvard Law School (with Honors) in 1973.

== Early career ==
McMullen was employed in management and consulting positions with several Boston-area companies and investment banks during the 1970s and 1980s, including Boston Consulting Group and Resource Planning Associates. He eventually founded his own consulting company, Cambridge Meridian Group, which provides strategic analysis and planning to corporate clients. McMullen also taught strategic planning and management, including time on the faculties at Harvard's business and law schools. From 1993 to 1997, McMullen served as an advisor to Senator Bill Bradley, and provided analysis and policy recommendations on issues including reducing crime in the United States and long-term management of the Social Security program.

== 1998 United States Senate race ==
McMullen had maintained a vacation home in Warren, Vermont beginning in 1983, and he made Vermont his permanent residence beginning in 1997.

In 1998, he declared his candidacy for the Republican nomination for U.S. Senator. As related by Chris Graff, longtime Vermont bureau chief for the Associated Press, McMullen's candidacy sustained an immediate blow when Graff interviewed retired Senator Robert Stafford about the January 1998 ice storm and other current events. During the discussion, Stafford persistently got McMullen's name wrong, calling him "Mulholland". Graff wrote that he tried to politely correct Stafford, but finally realized that Stafford's intent was to convey his opinion that McMullen was too unknown and too new to Vermont to be a viable candidate. The lede in the resulting story was that Vermont's senior Republican was of the view that McMullen had not lived in the state long enough to represent it in the senate, and Stafford's dismissal of McMullen as "Mulholland or whatever his name is" became a running joke among reporters and political operatives.

In the Republican primary, McMullen faced Fred Tuttle, a retired dairy farmer who had starred in a mock documentary film called Man with a Plan, a comedy about a retired farmer who decides to run for Vermont's seat in the United States House of Representatives. Tuttle and filmmaker John O'Brien considered using a Tuttle candidacy to promote the film, and accepted a suggestion from political columnist Peter Freyne to challenge McMullen rather than incumbent Congressman Bernie Sanders. Tuttle then ran in the Republican U.S. Senate primary, partly to generate awareness of the movie, and partly to mock McMullen as a carpetbagger and flatlander (Vermont slang for an out-of-stater) who had moved to Vermont only because he thought it would be easier to run for the Senate there than in more populous Massachusetts. McMullen was slow to recognize that the Tuttle/O'Brien strategy was viable; when the McMullen campaign challenged Tuttle's nominating petitions as 23 short of the required 500 signatures, Tuttle turned in an additional 2,300.

During a debate before the primary, Tuttle underscored McMullen's newness to Vermont. One question he posed to McMullen was "What's a tedder?" (A machine for drying hay.) Another was "What's rowen?" (The second cutting of hay from the same field in one season.) Tuttle continued with queries like "How many teats a Holstein got?" (Four; McMullen guessed six.) Tuttle then provided McMullen a list of local place names and asked him to pronounce them. McMullen's inexperience with Vermont geography showed, as he mispronounced names including Leicester (Lester is correct), Calais (callous being the correct way), and Charlotte (shar-LOT, not Shar-Lit).

The campaign made national headlines, and added to Tuttle's semi-celebrity status. Despite McMullen spending over $500,000 to Tuttle's $200, on primary day, Tuttle beat McMullen 28,355 votes to 23,321 (55 percent to 45). Tuttle immediately announced his intention to vote for incumbent Democratic Senator Patrick Leahy, after which the two made several joint appearances. On election day, Leahy defeated Tuttle and several minor candidates to win reelection.

== 2004 United States Senate race ==
McMullen continued to reside in Vermont after his 1998 election defeat. In 2004, he won the Republican nomination to oppose Patrick Leahy, who was running for a sixth term. In November, Leahy won the general election with 71 percent of the vote to McMullen's 25, with the rest scattered among minor candidates.

== 2012 election for Vermont Attorney General ==
In 2012, McMullen was the Republican nominee for Vermont Attorney General, and faced Democrat William Sorrell, the longtime incumbent, who was running for his eighth two-year term. Sorrell survived a close primary election against T. J. Donovan, and defeated McMullen in the general election with 58 percent of the vote to McMullen's 33, with the rest going to Progressive and Liberty Union candidates.

== Continued career ==
McMullen continued his business career after moving to Vermont, and resided in Burlington. He served on the boards of directors for several corporations, including Lentigen Corporation, Ezenia! Inc., Opus Bio, Inc, and MRO Software Inc. In addition, he was involved in several civic and government activities, including: chairman of Governor Jim Douglas's Project to Advance Government Efficiency; member of the board of directors for the Vermont Council on Economic Education; board member for Associated Industries of Vermont; member of the board for the Greater Burlington Industrial Corporation; member of the Ethan Allen Institute board of directors; and pro bono work to assist Ruggles House, a senior citizen housing facility in Burlington.

== Sources ==
=== Internet ===
- "New York City Birth Index, 1910-1965, Entry for John A. McMullen". Ancestry.com. Lehi, UT: Ancestry.com LLC. December 10, 1941.
- "U.S. Select Military Registers, 1862-1985, Entry for John A. McMullen". Ancestry.com. Lehi, UT: Ancestry.com LLC. 1965.
- "Executive Profile: John A. McMullen". Company Overview of Opus Bio, Inc. New York, NY: Bloomberg.com.
- Joshua L. (October 24, 2012). "Candidate Details: Jack McMullen". OurCampaigns.com.

=== News ===
- Galloway, Anne (August 12, 2012). "In case you missed it: WDEV's Mark Johnson interviews McMullen, GOP candidate for Vermont Attorney General". VT Digger. Montpelier, VT.
- Graff, Christopher (December 24, 2006). "He was in right place, at right time in history". Rutland Herald. Rutland, VT. Archived from the original on September 5, 2018.
- Heintz, Paul (January 21, 2014). "Donovan Says He Won't Challenge Sorrell for Attorney General in 2014". Seven Days. Burlington, VT.
- Lindholm, Jane; Smith, Matthew F. (June 18, 2018). "Cow Teats & How To Say 'Calais': Reflecting On The 1998 Tuttle-McMullen Debate". Vermont Public Radio. Colchester, VT.
- "Baruth: The Political Art Behind Fred Tuttle, The Man With A Plan". VT Digger. Montpelier, VT. November 27, 2016.
- Wallach, Steven J. (March 6, 2005). "Jack McMullen: Ex-Candidate, Back to Business, Says More Than Politics Drew Him To Vermont". Barre Montpelier Times Argus. Barre, VT.

Party political offices
Preceded by Fred Tuttle	Republican Party nominee for U.S. Senator from Vermont (Class 3); 2004	Succeeded by Len Britton
Preceded by Aaron Toscano	Republican Party nominee for Vermont Attorney General; 2012	Succeeded by Shane McCormack
