= 2012 Vermont elections =

- November 6, 2012

Vermont's 2012 general elections were held on November 6, 2012. Primary elections were held on August 28, 2012.

== Governor ==
Incumbent Democratic Governor Peter Shumlin (since 2011) ran for re-election.

== Lieutenant governor ==
Republican incumbent Phil Scott, who has held the position of Lieutenant Governor (since 2011) ran for re-election to a second term.

Cassandra Gekas, the former health care advocate for the Vermont Public Interest Research Group (VPIRG), sought the Democratic nomination to challenge Scott.

2012 Vermont lieutenant gubernatorial election
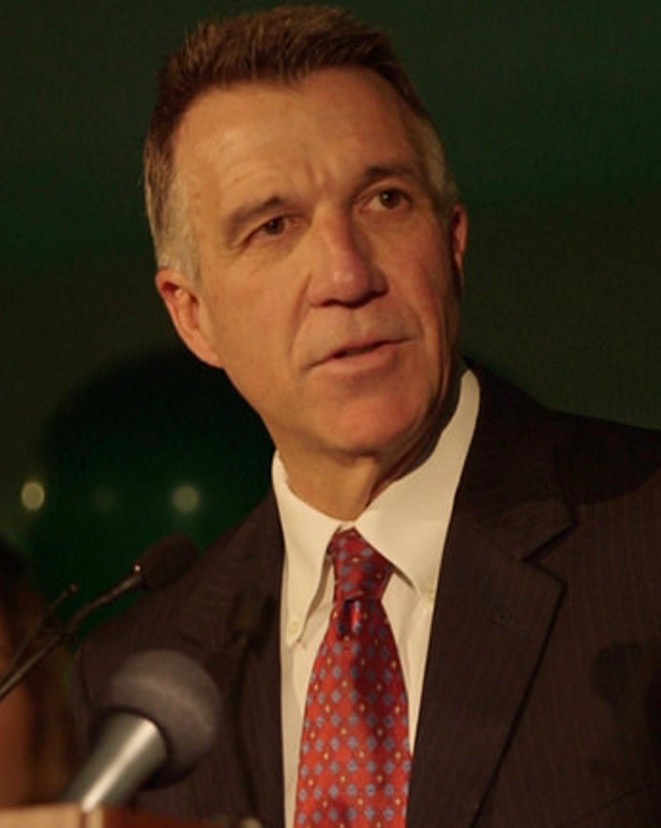

Nominee	Phil Scott	Cassandra Gekas
Party	Republican	Democratic
Popular vote	162,787	115,015
Percentage	57.1%	40.4%
- Scott: 40–50% 50–60% 60–70% 70–80% 80–90% Gekas: 40–50% 50–60% 60–70% 70–80% No Data/Vote
Lieutenant Governor before election
Phil Scott
Republican
Elected Lieutenant Governor
Phil Scott
Republican

=== Republican primary ===
Incumbent Phil Scott was unopposed in the Republican primary.

=== Democratic primary ===
Cassandra Gekas was unopposed for the nomination.

==== Liberty Union ====
Ben Mitchell was unopposed for the nomination.

=== General election ===
==== Candidates ====
- Ben Mitchell (LU)
- Cassandra Gekas (D)
- Phil Scott (R)

==== Results ====
2012 Vermont lieutenant gubernatorial election
Party	Candidate	Votes	%
Republican	Phil Scott (incumbent)	162,787	57.1
Democratic	Cassandra Gekas	115,015	40.4
Liberty Union	Ben Mitchell	6,975	2.4
Write-in	Write-ins	257	0.1
Total votes		285,034	100%

== Secretary of State ==
2012 Vermont secretary of state election
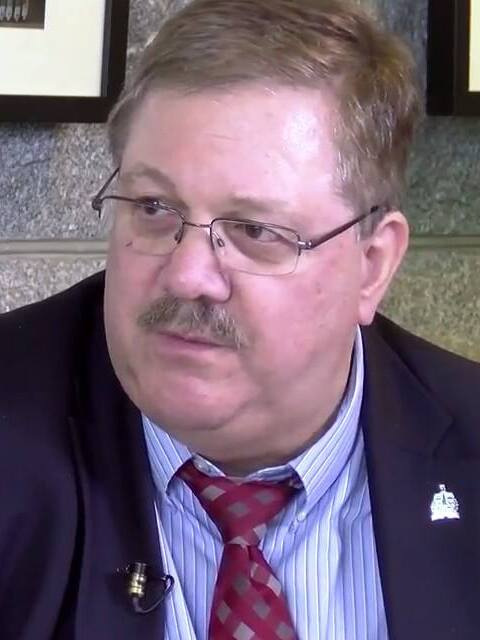

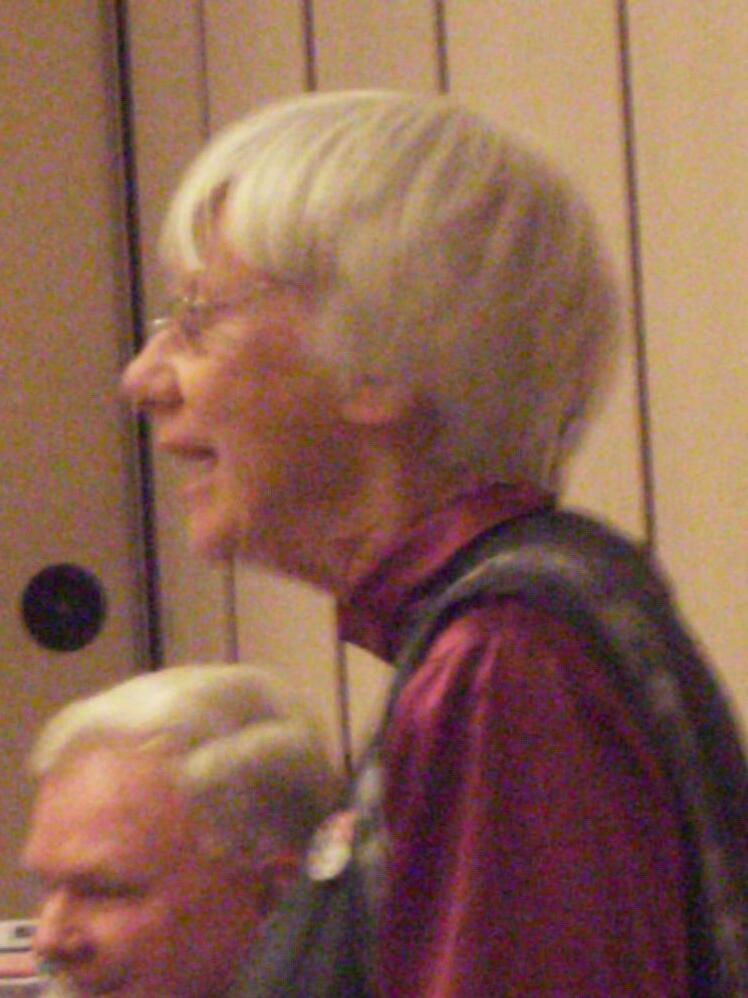
Nominee	Jim Condos	Mary Alice Herbert
Party	Democratic	Liberty Union
Popular vote	225,801	34,105
Percentage	86.6%	13.1%
- Condos: 50–60% 60–70% 70–80% 80–90% >90% No Data/Vote
Secretary of State before election
Jim Condos
Democratic
Elected Secretary of State
Jim Condos
Democratic

Democratic incumbent Jim Condos, who has held the position of Secretary of State of Vermont since 2011, is currently running unopposed in the primary as well as the general elections. Condos has also been nominated by the Progressive Party.

Liberty Union Party candidate Mary Alice Herbert was the sole declared candidate opposing Condos. She declined to debate Condos.

Condos received 86.6% of the votes cast for the office of SoS.

== Treasurer ==
2012 Vermont treasurer election
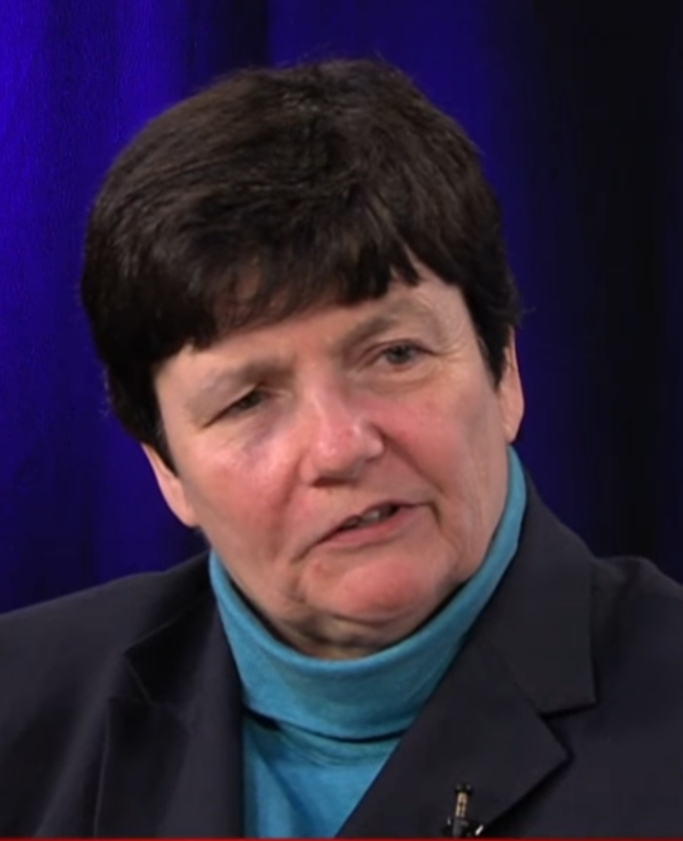

Nominee	Beth Pearce	Wendy Wilton
Party	Democratic	Republican
Popular vote	147,700	114,947
Percentage	52.3%	40.7%
- Pearce: 40–50% 50–60% 60–70% 70–80% Wilton: 40–50% 50–60% 60–70% No Data/Vote
Treasurer before election
Beth Pearce
Democratic
Elected Treasurer
Beth Pearce
Democratic

Democratic incumbent Beth Pearce, who was appointed to the position of Vermont State Treasurer in 2011, was elected to her first full term.

Wendy Wilton, the Rutland City Treasurer and former State Representative, was the Republican nominee. Don Schramm, a retired businessman, was the Progressive nominee for the third election in a row.

Vermont State Treasurer election, 2012
Party	Candidate	Votes	%	±%
Democratic	Beth Pearce	147,700	52.32%	
Republican	Wendy Wilton	114,947	40.72%	
Progressive	Don Schramm	12,497	4.43%	
Liberty Union	Jessica Diamondstone	6,939	2.46%	
Write-ins		198	0.07%	
Majority		32,573	11.5%	
Turnout		282,281		
Democratic hold		Swing		

== Attorney general ==
2012 Vermont attorney general election

Nominee	William Sorrell	John A. McMullen	Ed Stanak
Party	Democratic	Republican	Progressive
Popular vote	164,441	94,588	15,629
Percentage	57.9%	33.3%	5.5%
- Sorrell: 40–50% 50–60% 60–70% 70–80% 80–90% McMullen: 40–50% 50–60% No Data/Vote
Attorney general before election
William Sorrell
Democratic
Elected Attorney general
William Sorrell
Democratic

Incumbent William Sorrell, who had held the position of Vermont Attorney General since 1997, ran for re-election and defeated T. J. Donovan for the Democratic nomination.

Democratic primary results:

Sorrell, 21,124 (50.8%)
Donovan, 20,410 (49.1%)

For the general election, Jack McMullen, a businessman who ran for the U.S. Senate in 1998 and 2004, was the Republican nominee. Ed Stanak, a retired state employee and former president of the Vermont State Employees Union, was the Progressive candidate. Rosemarie Jackowski was on the ballot as the nominee of the Liberty Union Party.

In the general election, Sorrell won another term. The results were:

Sorrell, 164,441 (57.9%)
McMullen, 94,588 (33.3%)
Stanak, 15,629 (5.5%)
Jackowski, 8,533 (3.0%)
Write-in, 588 (0.2%)

== Auditor ==
Vermont Auditor of Accounts,2012
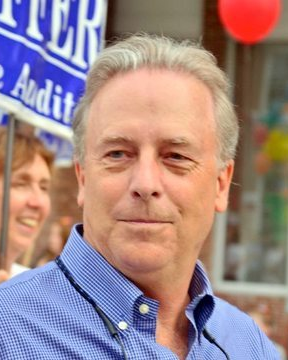

Nominee	Doug Hoffer	Vincent Illuzzi
Party	Democratic	Republican
Popular vote	140,805	123,806
Percentage	51.3%	45.1%
- Hoffer: 40–50% 50–60% 60–70% 70–80% Illuzzi: 40–50% 50–60% 60–70% 70–80% 80–90% No Data/Vote
Auditor before election
Thomas M. Salmon
Republican
Elected Auditor
Doug Hoffer
Democratic

On May 18, 2012, incumbent Auditor Thomas M. Salmon announced he would not be running for re-election.

=== Republican primary ===
==== Candidates ====
- Vincent Illuzzi, Essex/Orleans State Senate

==== Results ====
Republican primary results
Party	Candidate	Votes	%
Republican	Vincent Illuzzi	8,140	98.1
Republican	Write-ins	155	1.9
Total votes		8,295	100%

=== Democratic primary ===
==== Candidates ====
- Doug Hoffer, self-employed policy analyst, nominee for Auditor in 2010

==== Results ====
Democratic primary results
Party	Candidate	Votes	%
Democratic	Doug Hoffer	29,009	97.4
Democratic	Write-ins	784	2.6
Total votes		29,793	100%

=== General Election ===
==== Candidates ====
- Doug Hoffer (D/P)
- Vincent Illuzzi (R)
- Jerry Levy (LU)

==== Results ====
Vermont Auditor of Accounts election, 2012
Party	Candidate	Votes	%
Democratic	Doug Hoffer	140,805	51.3
Republican	Vincent Illuzzi	123,806	45.1
Liberty Union	Jerry Levy	9,381	3.4
Write-in	Write-ins	276	0.1
Total votes		274,268	100%

== General Assembly ==
=== State Senate ===
All 30 members of the Vermont Senate are up for election. The state Senate currently consists of 21 Democrats, 8 Republicans, and 1 Progressive (who caucuses with the Democratic majority).

=== State House of Representatives ===
All 150 members of the Vermont House of Representatives are up for election. The state House currently consists of 94 Democrats, 48 Republicans, 5 Progressives (who caucus with the Democratic majority), and 3 Independents (who also caucus with the Democratic majority).

Open seats

- Caledonia-2: Democratic incumbent and House Majority Leader Lucy Leriche retired.
- Caledonia-4: Republican incumbent Howard Crawford retired.
- Chittenden-6-3 (Chittenden-3-3 prior to redistricting): Democratic incumbent Jason Lorber retired.
- Chittenden-6-6: This is a new seat, with no incumbent.
- Chittenden-6-7 (Chittenden-3-6 prior to redistricting): Democratic incumbent Kenneth Atkins retired.
- Chittenden-7-4 (Chittenden-3-9 prior to redistricting): Democratic incumbent Bert Munger retired.
- Essex-Caledonia: Republican incumbent Janice L. Peaslee retired.
- Franklin-2 (Franklin-1 prior to redistricting): Democratic incumbent Gary Gilbert retired.
- Franklin-3-1 (Franklin-3 prior to redistricting): Republican incumbent Dustin Allard Degree is seeking a state Senate seat.
- Franklin-5 (Franklin-6 prior to redistricting): Republican incumbent Norman H. McAllister is seeking a state Senate seat.
- Franklin-6 (Franklin-2 prior to redistricting): Democratic incumbent Richard Howrigan retired.
- Lamoille-3 (Lamoille-4 prior to redistricting): Republican incumbent Adam Howard retired.
- Orleans-1: Republican incumbent Robert Lewis is seeking a state Senate seat.
- Rutland-6 (Rutland-7 prior to redistricting): Republican incumbent Joe Acinapura retired.
- Windham-2-3 (Windham-3-3 prior to redistricting): Progressive incumbent Sarah Edwards retired.
- Windham-Bennington-Windsor-1: Republican incumbent Oliver Olsen retired.
- Windsor-2: Democratic incumbent Ernest Shand retired.
- Windsor-4-2 (Windsor-6-2 prior to redistricting): Democratic incumbent Charles Bohi retired.
