= 1998 United States Senate election in Vermont =

- November 3, 1998
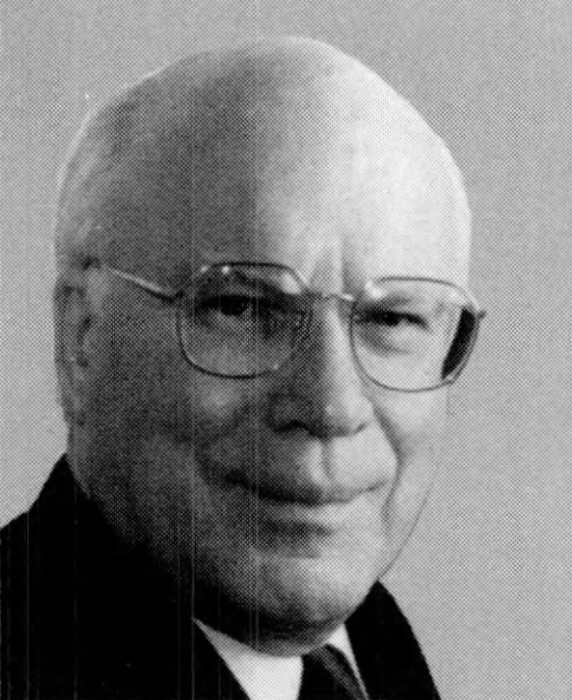

| Nominee | Patrick Leahy | Fred Tuttle |
| Party | Democratic | Republican |
| Popular vote | 154,567 | 48,051 |
| Percentage | 72.22% | 22.45% |
- Leahy: 40–50% 50–60% 60–70% 70–80% 80–90% Tuttle: 40–50% 50–60%
U.S. senator before election
Patrick Leahy
Democratic
Elected U.S. Senator
Patrick Leahy
Democratic

The 1998 United States Senate election in Vermont was held November 3, 1998. Incumbent Democratic U.S. Senator Patrick Leahy won reelection to a fifth term.

Notably, the Republican nominee, dairy farmer and actor Fred Tuttle, had run to draw attention to the mock documentary film Man with a Plan, of which he was the star, and to ridicule Republican candidate Jack McMullen as too new to Vermont to represent it in Washington. With no previous political experience, Tuttle secured the nomination, and immediately endorsed Leahy and all but withdrew from the race. His campaign, which had been conducted primarily from his front porch in Tunbridge, Vermont, spent only $251 during the election season and featured the slogans "Spread Fred!" and "Why Not?". Despite his endorsement of Leahy, Tuttle still received 48,051 votes, or 22% of the total.

== Democratic primary ==
=== Candidates ===
- Patrick Leahy, incumbent U.S. Senator

=== Results ===
Democratic primary results
| Party | Candidate | Votes | % |
|---|---|---|---|
| Democratic | Patrick Leahy (incumbent) | 18,643 | 96.65% |
| Democratic | Write-ins | 647 | 3.35% |
| Total votes | | 19,290 | 100.00% |

== Grassroots primary ==
=== Candidates ===
- Robert Melamede

=== Results ===
Grassroots Party primary results
| Party | Candidate | Votes | % |
|---|---|---|---|
| Grassroots | Robert Melamede | 137 | 59.57% |
| Grassroots | Write-ins | 93 | 40.43% |
| Total votes | | 230 | 100.00% |

== Republican primary ==
=== Candidates ===
- Fred Tuttle, dairy farmer and actor
- Jack McMullen, businessman

=== Campaign ===
McMullen had maintained a vacation home in Warren, Vermont beginning in 1983, and he made Vermont his permanent residence beginning in 1997.

In 1998, he declared his candidacy for the Republican nomination for U.S. Senator. As related by Chris Graff, longtime Vermont bureau chief for the Associated Press, McMullen's candidacy sustained an immediate blow when Graff interviewed retired Senator Robert Stafford about the January 1998 ice storm and other current events. During the discussion, Stafford persistently got McMullen's name wrong, calling him "Mulholland". Graff wrote that he tried to politely correct Stafford, but finally realized that Stafford's intent was to convey his opinion that McMullen was too unknown and too new to Vermont to be a viable candidate. The lede in the resulting story was that Vermont's senior Republican was of the view that McMullen had not lived in the state long enough to represent it in the senate, and Stafford's dismissal of McMullen as "Mulholland or whatever his name is" became a running joke among reporters and political operatives.

In the Republican primary, McMullen faced Fred Tuttle, a retired dairy farmer who had starred in a mock documentary film called Man with a Plan, a comedy about a retired farmer who decides to run for Vermont's seat in the United States House of Representatives. Tuttle and filmmaker John O'Brien considered using a Tuttle candidacy to promote the film, and accepted a suggestion from political columnist Peter Freyne to challenge McMullen rather than incumbent Congressman Bernie Sanders. Tuttle then ran in the Republican U.S. Senate primary, partly to generate awareness of the movie, and partly to mock McMullen as a carpetbagger and flatlander (Vermont slang for an out-of-stater) who had moved to Vermont only because he thought it would be easier to run for the Senate there than in more populous Massachusetts. McMullen was slow to recognize that the Tuttle/O'Brien strategy was viable; when the McMullen campaign challenged Tuttle's nominating petitions as 23 short of the required 500 signatures, Tuttle turned in an additional 2,300.

During a debate before the primary, Tuttle underscored McMullen's newness to Vermont. One question he posed to McMullen was "What's a tedder?" (A machine for drying hay.) Another was "What's rowen?" (The second cutting of hay from the same field in one season.) Tuttle continued with queries like "How many teats a Holstein got?" (Four; McMullen guessed six.) Tuttle then provided McMullen a list of local place names and asked him to pronounce them. McMullen's inexperience with Vermont geography showed, as he mispronounced names including Leicester (Lester is correct), Calais (callous being the correct way), and Charlotte (shar-LOT, not Shar-Lit).

The campaign made national headlines, and added to Tuttle's semi-celebrity status. Despite McMullen spending over $500,000 to Tuttle's $200, on primary day, Tuttle beat McMullen 28,355 votes to 23,321 (54% to 44%). Tuttle immediately announced his intention to vote for incumbent Democratic Senator Patrick Leahy, after which the two made several joint appearances. On election day, Leahy defeated Tuttle and several minor candidates to win reelection.

=== Results ===
Republican primary results
| Party | Candidate | Votes | % |
|---|---|---|---|
| Republican | Fred Tuttle | 28,355 | 53.69% |
| Republican | Jack McMullen | 23,321 | 44.16% |
| Republican | Write-ins | 1,137 | 2.15% |
| Total votes | | 52,813 | 100.00% |

== General election ==
=== Candidates ===
==== Major ====
- Patrick Leahy (D), incumbent U.S. Senator
- Fred Tuttle (R), dairy farmer and actor (endorsed Leahy)

==== Minor ====
- Hugh Douglas (L)
- Jerry Levy (LU)
- Robert Melamede (GR)
- Barry Nelson (I)

=== Polling ===
| Poll source | Date(s) administered | Sample size (Note: Key: A – all adults RV – registered voters LV – likely voters V – unclear) | Margin of error | Patrick Leahy (D) | Fred Tuttle (R) | Undecided |
|---|---|---|---|---|---|---|
| Mason Dixon | August 1–3, 1998 | 628 (LV) | ± 4.0% | 69% | 20% | 11% |

=== Results ===
General election results
| Party | Candidate | Votes | % | ±% |
|---|---|---|---|---|
| Democratic | Patrick Leahy (incumbent) | 154,567 | 72.22% | +18.05% |
| Republican | Fred Tuttle | 48,051 | 22.45% | −20.90% |
| Libertarian | Hugh Douglas | 4,199 | 1.96% | |
| Independent | Barry Nelson | 2,893 | 1.35% | |
| Grassroots | Robert Melamede | 2,459 | 1.15% | |
| Liberty Union | Jerry Levy | 1,238 | 0.58% | −1.21% |
| Write-ins | | 629 | 0.29% | |
| Majority | | 106,516 | 49.77% | +38.95% |
| Turnout | | 214,036 | | |
| Democratic hold | | Swing | | |

== See also ==
- 1998 United States Senate elections

== Sources ==
- "Baruth: The political art behind Fred Tuttle, the Man with a Plan". VTDigger. November 27, 2016.
- Graff, Christopher (December 24, 2006). "He was in right place, at right time in history". Rutland Herald. Rutland, VT. Archived from the original on September 5, 2018.
- Lindholm, Jane; Smith, Matthew F. (June 18, 2018). "Cow Teats & How To Say 'Calais': Reflecting On The 1998 Tuttle-McMullen Debate". Vermont Public Radio. Colchester, VT.
