= Fred Tuttle =

American farmer, actor, World War II veteran, and Republican candidate

Personal details
- Born: Frederick Herman Tuttle; July 18, 1919 Tunbridge, Vermont, U.S.
- Died: October 4, 2003 (aged 84) Burlington, Vermont, U.S.
- Resting place: Spring Road Cemetery, Tunbridge, Vermont
- Party: Republican
- Spouse: Dorothy Louise Savage (m. 1961)
- Education: South Royalton High School
- Occupation: Dairy farmer

Frederick Herman Tuttle (July 18, 1919 – October 4, 2003) was an American dairy farmer, actor, United States Army veteran of World War II, and Republican tongue-in-cheek candidate for the United States Senate from Vermont in 1998. He lived in Tunbridge all his life, and attended South Royalton High School before dropping out after the tenth grade to begin a career as a dairy farmer. He served in the U.S. Army during World War II, and participated in military actions in the European Theater.

Tuttle retired from farming in 1984, and continued to reside in Tunbridge, where he engaged in gardening and other hobbies. Tuttle was a neighbor of filmmaker John O'Brien, who recognized that Tuttle's charisma and unique personality might come across well on film. As a result, he cast Tuttle in movie roles including parts in Nosey Parker and Man with a Plan. In 1998, Tuttle and O'Brien decided that a Tuttle candidacy for public office might help publicize Man with a Plan, a mock documentary which centers on the idea of a retired farmer (Tuttle) running for the United States House of Representatives because it is easier and pays better than farming. He decided to run for the Republican nomination to oppose Senator Patrick Leahy, in part to promote the film, and in part to poke fun at Jack McMullen, a recent arrival to Vermont, who was accused of moving to the state because it would be easier to campaign for a United States Senate seat there than in his home state of Massachusetts.

Tuttle defeated McMullen by 5,034 votes out of 52,813 cast in the Republican primary after a campaign of humorous and memorable incidents. Vermont has an open primary system and many Democrats voted in the Republican primary to help Tuttle win. He then announced that he had no intention of leaving Tunbridge or serving in the Senate, and endorsed Leahy for reelection. They made several joint appearances, and Leahy easily won reelection in November. The campaign added to Tuttle's growing status as a folk figure and cult hero, and a steady stream of public appearances followed. However, many Republicans in Vermont resented his false candidacy which they felt denied them the right to a legitimate candidate in the Senate race since McMullen was seen as their best chance to unseat Leahy in years. He died in 2003, and was buried in Tunbridge.

== Early life ==
Tuttle was born in Tunbridge, Vermont, the son of Bessie Laura (Hoyt) and Joseph Charles Tuttle. He lived in Tunbridge all his life, except for his military service. He attended the schools of Tunbridge, and completed tenth grade at South Royalton High School before going to work on his family's dairy farm.

== Military service ==
Tuttle served in the United States Army during World War II. He participated in military actions in Europe, first with the Military Police, and then the Army Corps of Engineers.

== Post-World War II ==
In 1947, Tuttle married Ida May Foote (1916–2000) in Canterbury, New Hampshire. They divorced and in 1953, Tuttle married Charlotte Lorraine Perry (1929–1999) in White River Junction, Vermont. He married Dorothy L. (Hilts) (1929–2011) in Maine in 1961.

== Later career ==
Tuttle retired from farming in 1984 and engaged in gardening and other hobbies. After his retirement, he appeared in several movies directed by Vermont filmmaker John O'Brien, including Nosey Parker and Man with a Plan. He starred in the latter, playing a retired farmer who decides to run for U.S. Representative from Vermont.

In 1998, Tuttle was persuaded to run in the Republican U.S. Senate primary as a way to publicize Man with a Plan. His opponent was Jack McMullen, a multi-millionaire who had lived in Massachusetts for most of his adult life. O'Brien and Tuttle targeted McMullen as a carpetbagger who apparently moved to Vermont for the sole purpose of establishing residency for a Senate run. Vermont's open primary structure allowed Democrats and Independents to vote in the Republican primary, and many political observers foresaw the possibility that Tuttle could draw votes across party lines.

Tuttle campaigned on a platform that seemed absurdist by the standards of contemporary politics. McMullen and the state Republican Party challenged Tuttle's nominating petitions and got 95 signatures invalidated. Tuttle needed to obtain 23 more to stay on the ballot, and proceeded to obtain 2,309. McMullen sent flowers to Tuttle while Tuttle was hospitalized for knee surgery.

During their debate on Vermont Public Radio, Tuttle asked a series of humorous local knowledge questions. McMullen was unable to correctly pronounce the names of several Vermont towns, or correctly answer Tuttle's dairy farming-related questions, such as "How many teats a Holstein got?" answering "Six", instead of the correct four. In the primary, Tuttle defeated McMullen by ten percentage points and promptly endorsed the incumbent Democrat, Patrick Leahy.

Tuttle's subsequent general election campaign continued to generate publicity. He made several joint appearances with Leahy and continued to endorse him, saying "He knows how many tits on a cow." Tuttle commented that he did not really want to win because he would have to move to Washington, D.C. Despite endorsing his opponent, Tuttle garnered 48,051 votes (22 percent of the vote) in the actual election.

Tuttle was described by Senator Leahy as "the distilled essence of Vermonthood". He was considered by many to be an example of both the "everyman" and of the unique individualist.

== Death and burial ==
Tuttle died in Burlington, Vermont, after being hospitalized with a heart attack following a day spent digging potatoes at his home in Tunbridge. He was buried at Tunbridge's Spring Road Cemetery wearing his overalls, with a pen in his pocket for autograph signing and a can of Moxie by his side.

== Electoral history ==
1998 Republican primary results
Party	Candidate	Votes	%
Republican	Fred Tuttle	28,355	53.69%
Republican	Jack McMullen	23,321	44.16%
Republican	Write-ins	1,137	2.15%
Total votes		52,813	100.00%

1998 General election results
Party	Candidate	Votes	%	±%
Democratic	Patrick Leahy (Incumbent)	154,567	72.22%	+18.05%
Republican	Fred Tuttle	48,051	22.45%	−20.90%
Libertarian	Hugh Douglas	4,199	1.96%	
Independent	Barry Nelson	2,893	1.35%	
Grassroots	Robert Melamede	2,459	1.15%	
Liberty Union	Jerry Levy	1,238	0.58%	−1.21%
Write-ins		629	0.29%	
Majority		106,516	49.77%	+38.95%
Turnout		214,036		
Democratic hold				

== Notes ==
Party political offices
Preceded by Jim Douglas	Republican Party nominee for U.S. Senator from Vermont (Class 3); 1998	Succeeded by Jack McMullen
