= Lawrence Jackson (photographer) =

American photographer

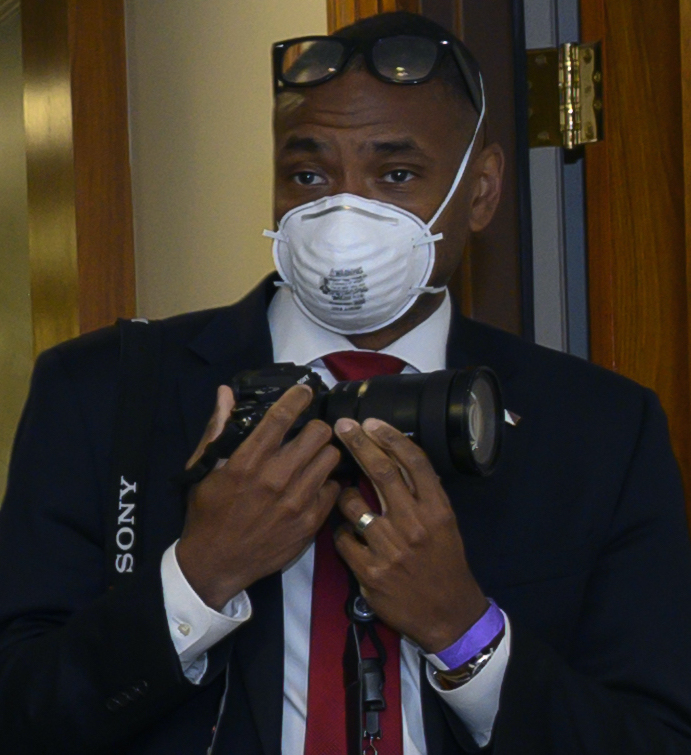
- Jackson in 2021
- Born: Richmond, Virginia, U.S.
- Education: James Madison University (BA)
- Spouse: Alicia Leahy Jackson
- Children: 2
- Relatives: Patrick Leahy (father-in-law); Lance Jackson (brother)
- Website: Official website

Lawrence Jackson is an American photographer and photojournalist. He was an official White House photographer, covering the vice presidency of Kamala Harris. He also served as an official White House photographer for the Obama administration. Before his work in government, he was a news photographer.

== Early life and education ==
Jackson was born in Richmond, Virginia. He attended George Wythe High School, where he worked for the high school newspaper. He earned his bachelor's degree in photography from James Madison University in 1990. While attending college, he was photography editor for The Breeze. After graduation, he worked as an intern for Landmark Communications.

== Career ==
Jackson's first full-time photography job after graduation was for The Virginian-Pilot. In December 2000, he joined the Associated Press (AP) as a staff photographer. First based in Boston, he covered sports and also worked in South Korea. In 2002, he moved to Washington, D.C. to work at the AP's Washington bureau. In Washington, Jackson covered national politics and Washington sports.

=== Obama administration ===
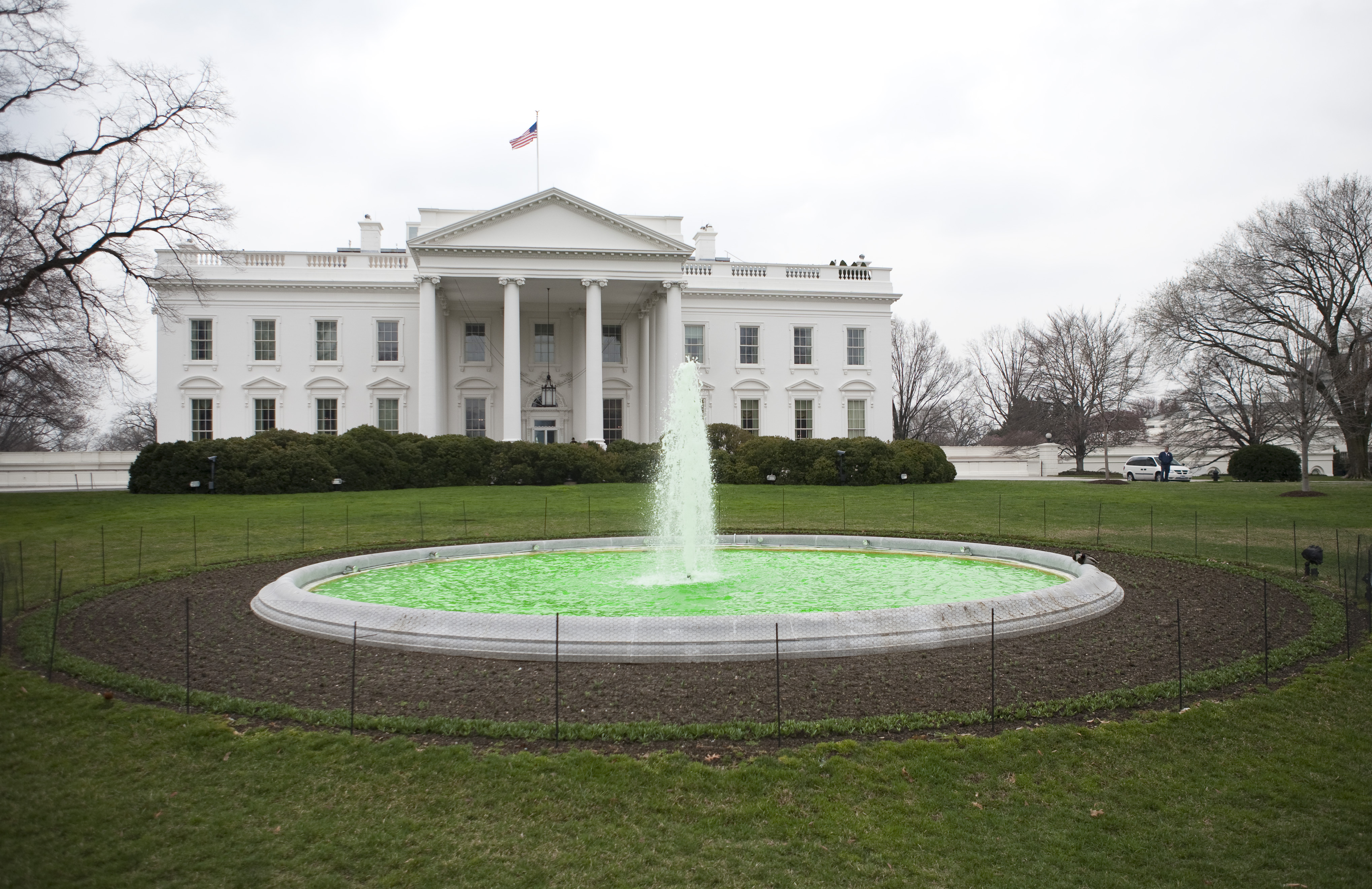
One of the first photographs Jackson took, upon joining the Obama administration, was of the two White House fountains on both lawns dyed green for Saint Patrick's Day.

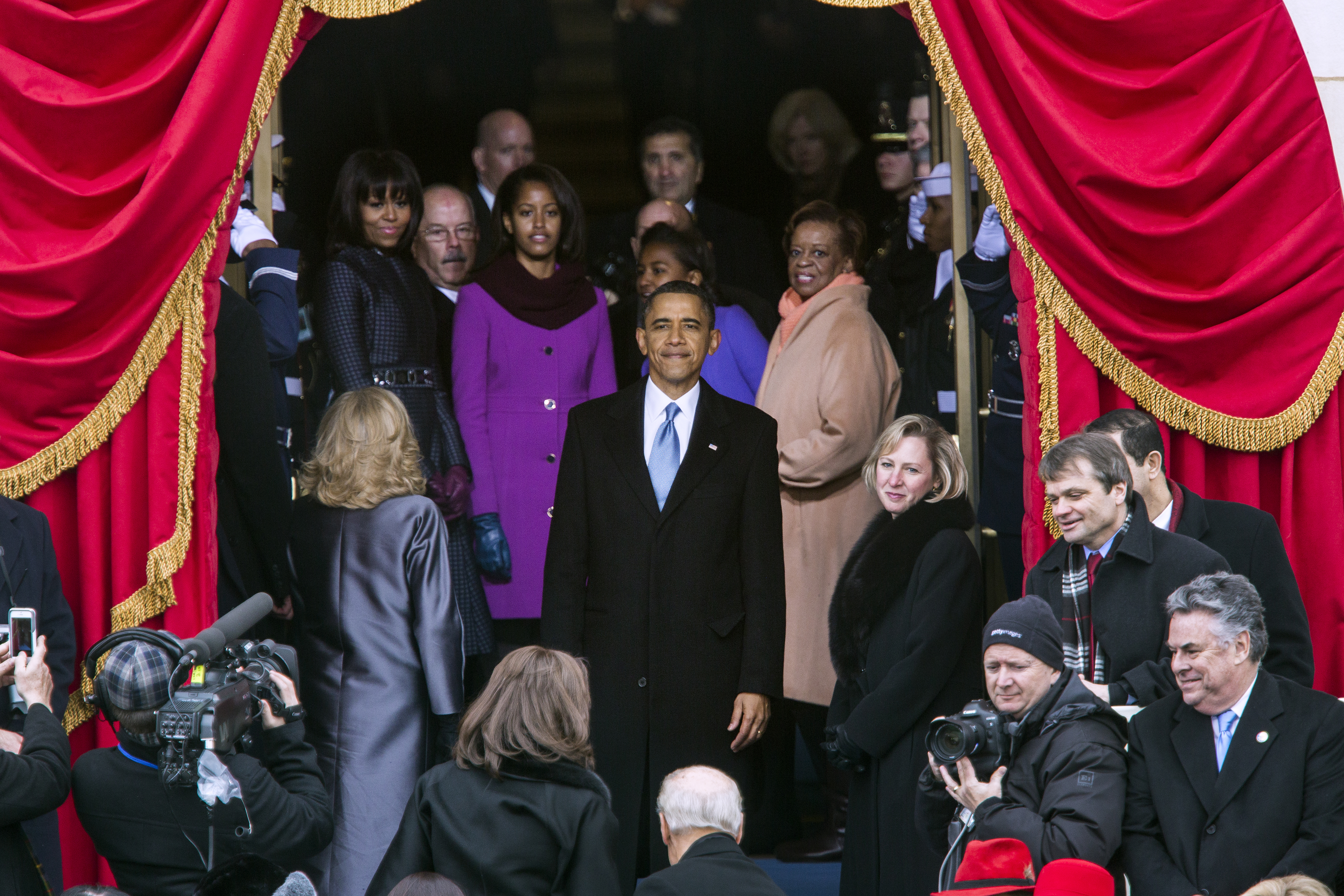
Barack Obama, as photographed by Jackson, on January 20, 2013, as the President pauses to look back at the crowd attending his second inauguration.

On election night, 2008, Jackson went to Lafayette Square in DC, where thousands had gathered to celebrate Obama's election win. He shot the celebration for the AP. During the impromptu event, Jackson interacted with college students who were reveling in the Obama win. Inspired by the experience and his appreciation for Barack Obama, he decided to apply to be a photographer for the Obama administration. In a 2019 interview with WYNC, Jackson said if Hillary Clinton would have become president, he would have not applied for the job, saying "that's no knock against her. It just shows how much I appreciated him and thought his message was important." Pete Souza called Jackson and reviewed his portfolio with him at a coffee shop in Arlington, Virginia. He offered the job. However, he hesitated, concerned about the salary, which was lower than his AP salary. He was concerned it could not support his wife and two children. However, his wife, Alicia, convinced him otherwise, offering to go back to work herself.

Lawrence started in March 2009. His first assignment was to photograph the fountains of the White House which were dyed green to celebrate Saint Patrick's Day. Jackson was the only African American photographer in the Obama administration. During his eight-year tenure, he traveled to 42 countries and shot half a million photographs.

=== Work between administrations ===
Jackson became a freelance photographer after working in the White House. In October 2019, he released a book documenting his time in the Obama administration called Yes We Did: Photos and Behind-the-Scenes Stories Celebrating Our First African American President. Obama provided the foreword for the book. He also worked as a photographer for the Obama Foundation.

During the 2020 Democratic presidential primary, Jackson worked for Pete Buttigieg and Elizabeth Warren, documenting their time on the election trail. He was a staff photographer to Harris on the Biden-Harris Campaign.

=== Biden administration ===
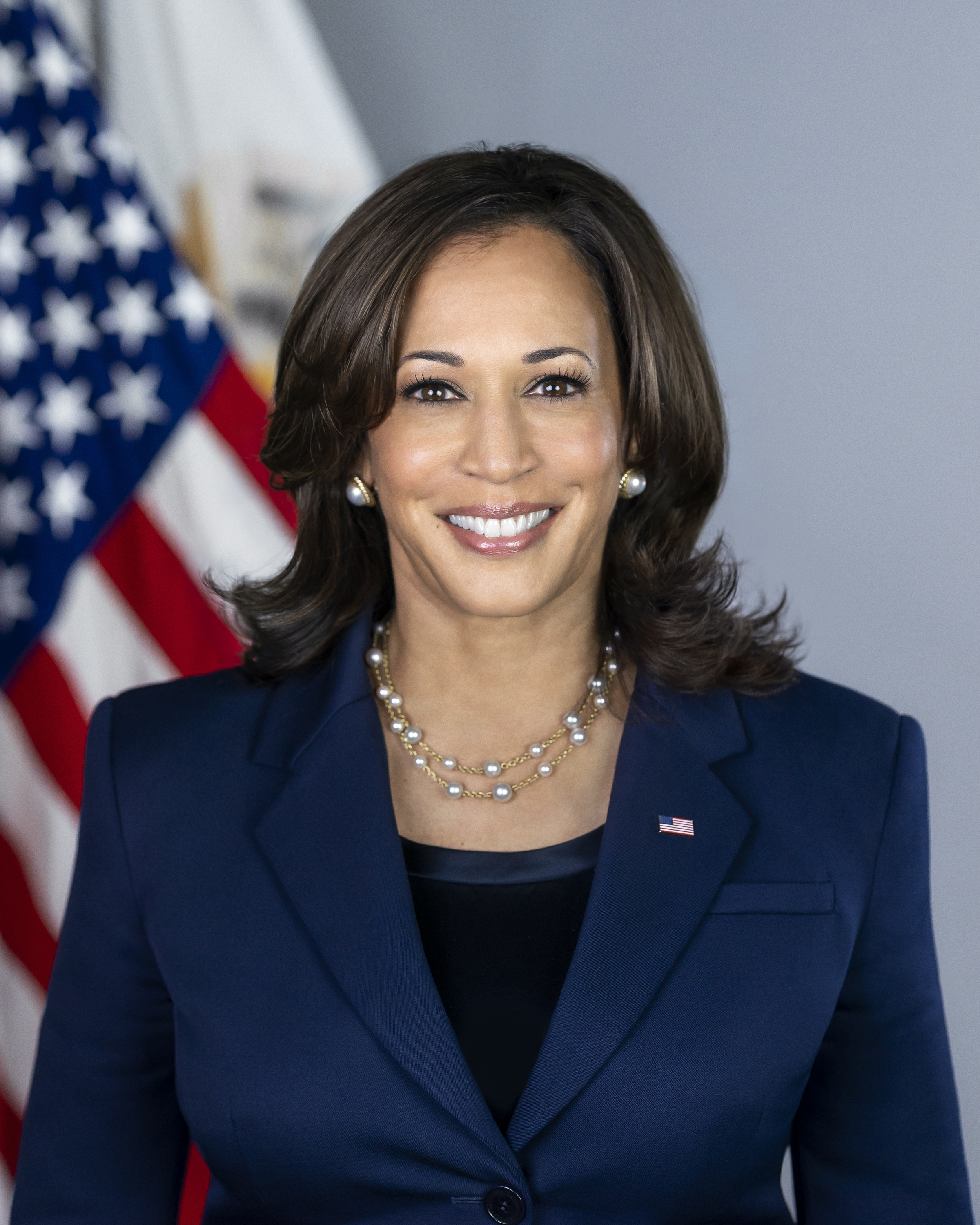
Kamala Harris's vice presidential portrait, taken by Jackson on March 5, 2021

On January 15, 2021, Jackson was named as an official White House photographer, again, joining the administration to document the work and life of Kamala Harris.

== Personal life ==
Jackson is married to the former Alicia Leahy, daughter of former Senator Patrick Leahy. They have two children.

== Works ==
- Yes We Did: Photos and Behind-the-Scenes Stories Celebrating Our First African American President. New York: TarcherPerigee (2019). ISBN 0525541012

== See also ==
- Adam Schultz (Chief Official White House Photographer for the presidency of Joe Biden)
