= Patrick Leahy =

American politician and attorney (born 1940)

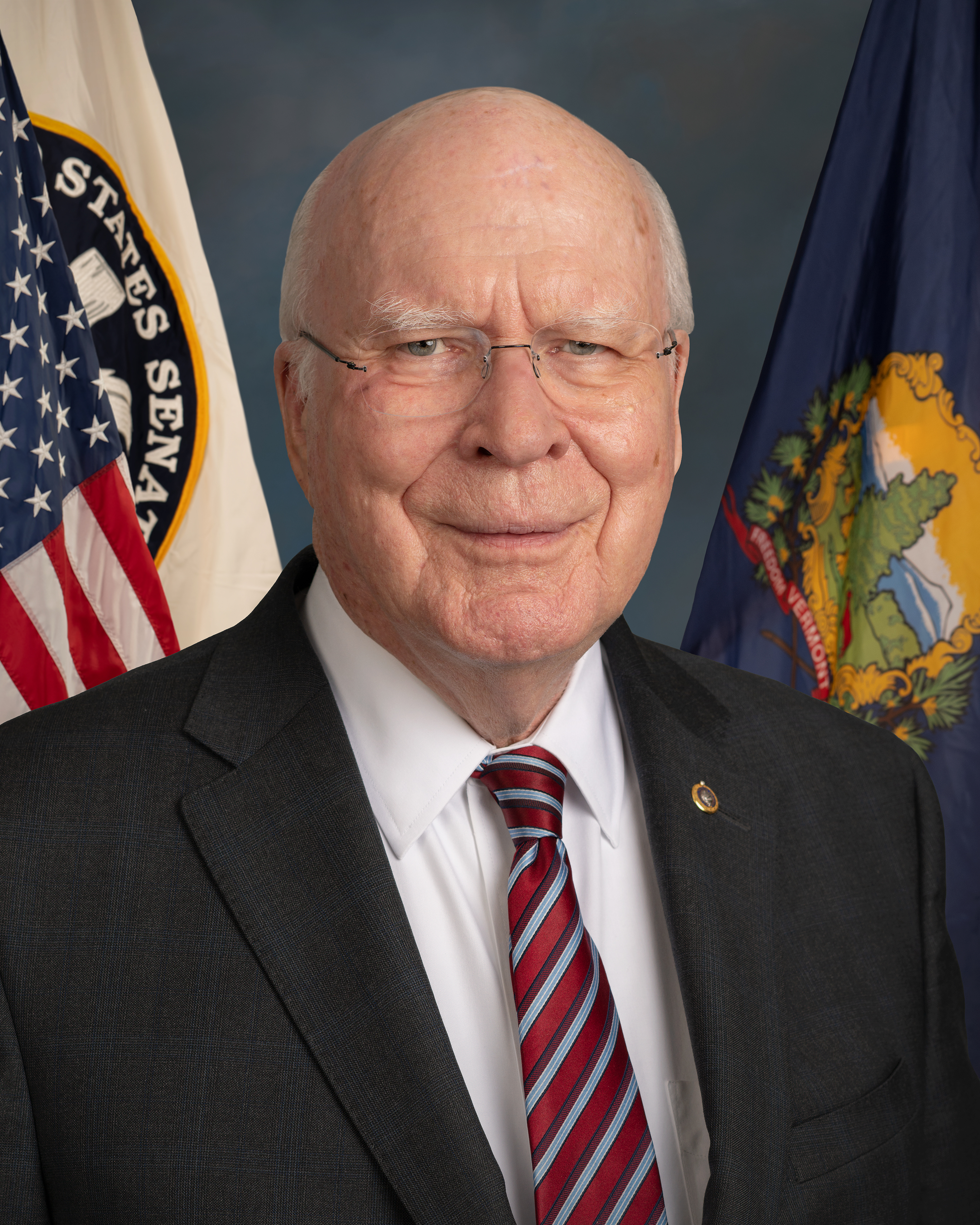
- Official portrait, 2021

President pro tempore of the United States Senate
- In office January 20, 2021 – January 3, 2023
- Preceded by: Chuck Grassley
- Succeeded by: Patty Murray
- In office December 17, 2012 – January 3, 2015
- Preceded by: Daniel Inouye
- Succeeded by: Orrin Hatch
Senate positions
President pro tempore emeritus of the United States Senate
In office January 3, 2015 – January 20, 2021
Preceded by	Ted Stevens (2009)
Succeeded by	Chuck Grassley
Dean of the United States Senate
In office December 17, 2012 – January 3, 2023
Preceded by	Daniel Inouye
Succeeded by	Chuck Grassley
Chairman of the Senate Appropriations Committee
In office February 3, 2021 – January 3, 2023
Preceded by	Richard Shelby
Succeeded by	Patty Murray
Ranking Member of the Senate Appropriations Committee
In office January 3, 2017 – February 3, 2021
Preceded by	Barbara Mikulski
Succeeded by	Richard Shelby
Chairman of the Senate Judiciary Committee
In office January 3, 2007 – January 3, 2015
Preceded by	Arlen Specter
Succeeded by	Chuck Grassley
In office May 24, 2001 – January 3, 2003
Preceded by	Orrin Hatch
Succeeded by	Orrin Hatch
In office January 3, 2001 – January 20, 2001
Preceded by	Orrin Hatch
Succeeded by	Orrin Hatch
Ranking Member of the Senate Judiciary Committee
In office January 3, 2015 – January 3, 2017
Preceded by	Chuck Grassley
Succeeded by	Dianne Feinstein
In office January 3, 2003 – January 3, 2007
Preceded by	Orrin Hatch
Succeeded by	Arlen Specter
In office January 3, 1997 – January 3, 2001
Preceded by	Joe Biden
Succeeded by	Orrin Hatch
Chair of the Senate Agriculture Committee
In office January 3, 1987 – January 3, 1995
Preceded by	Jesse Helms
Succeeded by	Richard Lugar
Ranking Member of the Senate Agriculture Committee
In office January 3, 1995 – January 3, 1997
Preceded by	Richard Lugar
Succeeded by	Tom Harkin

United States Senator from Vermont
- In office January 3, 1975 – January 3, 2023
- Preceded by: George Aiken
- Succeeded by: Peter Welch

State's Attorney of Chittenden County
- In office May 10, 1966 – January 2, 1975
- Preceded by: John Fitzpatrick
- Succeeded by: Francis Murray

Personal details
- Born: Patrick Joseph Leahy; March 31, 1940 (age 86) Montpelier, Vermont, U.S.
- Party: Democratic
- Spouse: Marcelle Pomerleau (m. 1962)
- Children: 3
- Relatives: Lawrence Jackson (son-in-law)
- Education: Saint Michael's College (BA); Georgetown University (JD)
- Patrick Leahy's voice Leahy on issues with making English the country's sole national language. Recorded May 18, 2006

Patrick Joseph Leahy (/ˈleɪhi/ LAY-hee; born March 31, 1940) is an American politician and attorney who represented Vermont in the United States Senate from 1975 to 2023. A member of the Democratic Party, he served as the president pro tempore of the United States Senate from 2012 to 2015 and again from 2021 to 2023.

Leahy was the first Democrat ever elected to the U.S. Senate from Vermont and the third-longest-serving U.S. senator in history at 48 years. During his tenure he chaired the Senate Appropriations Committee, the Senate Judiciary Committee and the Senate Agriculture Committee. Leahy became the most senior senator in 2012 and in 2022 he became the most senior member of either house of Congress. At the time of his retirement, Leahy was the dean of Vermont's congressional delegation, Vermont's longest-serving U.S. senator. Leahy was succeeded by Peter Welch, who became the second Democrat to represent Vermont in the Senate.

Leahy's signature legislation is the Leahy Law forbidding the United States from funding foreign military units which violate human rights. Leahy was the presiding officer at Donald Trump's second impeachment trial, becoming the first senator to preside over a former president's impeachment trial. In 2023, Burlington International Airport was renamed after him.

== Early life and education ==
Leahy was born in Montpelier, Vermont, on March 31, 1940, the son of Alba (née Zambon) and Howard Francis Leahy. He has been legally blind in his left eye since birth. Leahy's maternal grandparents were Italian, and his father was of Irish ancestry; some of his ancestors came to Vermont in the 19th century to work at the granite quarries and manufacturing plants in Barre Town and Barre City. The Leahys ran a printing business across from the Vermont State House, and were also the publishers of the Waterbury Record newspaper. Leahy attended the parochial schools of Montpelier, and graduated from Montpelier's St. Michael's High School in 1957.

In 1961, Leahy graduated from Saint Michael's College with a Bachelor of Arts degree in government. While attending college, Leahy was a member of the National Federation of Catholic College Students. He was also involved with the Knights of Columbus, the Saint Michael's College Glee Club, and the school's pre-law society and politics club. He was active with the Reserve Officers' Training Corps rifle team, and was a member of the varsity rifle team. He was also on the staff of The Shield, the Saint Michael's College yearbook and WSSE, the school's AM radio station. In 1964, Leahy received his Juris Doctor from the Georgetown University Law Center. (Note: Leahy received an LL.B. degree. Law schools began offering the Juris Doctor as the graduate law degree in the late 1960s; Georgetown made the change in 1967 and made it retroactive so previous graduates could have their degrees revised.) While in law school, Leahy was active in the Phi Delta Phi legal honor society. In addition, Leahy participated in Georgetown Law's Legal Aid Society and Legal Argument Program. He was also a representative to the school's Student Bar Association.

At graduation, Leahy was offered an E. Barrett Prettyman Fellowship, which would have enabled him to earn a Master of Laws degree from Georgetown while receiving training in courtroom advocacy. Leahy was also interviewed by the United States Attorney General, Robert F. Kennedy as one of several Georgetown Law students being considered for recruitment into the United States Department of Justice. He declined the fellowship and did not pursue a position at the Department of Justice because he intended to return to Vermont, and because he did not plan to practice criminal law.

== Early career ==
Leahy was admitted to the bar soon after his law school graduation and became an associate at the Burlington firm headed by Philip H. Hoff, who then was governor of Vermont. In January 1965, Leahy was appointed as an assistant to Lewis E. Springer Jr., the legislative draftsman for the Vermont General Assembly. While working for Hoff's firm, Leahy was also appointed as Burlington's assistant city attorney.

In May 1966, Hoff appointed Leahy State's Attorney of Chittenden County after the incumbent resigned. Leahy was elected to a full term in 1966 and reelected in 1970. His service as state's attorney was notable for his participation in the sting operation that caught Paul Lawrence, an undercover police officer for numerous departments in Vermont. Lawrence falsely claimed to have purchased illegal drugs from several people, resulting in numerous convictions based on his perjury.

From 1971 to 1974, Leahy served as vice president of the National Association of District Attorneys, and in 1974 the organization named him one of the country's three outstanding prosecutors. Beginning in 1971, he was also involved in the extensive effort to solve the murder of Rita Curran, who had been killed in her Burlington apartment. The murder, which Leahy later called among the most violent he saw while working as a prosecutor, went unsolved until 2023, when DNA testing of evidence left at the crime scene led to the identification of the perpetrator.

== U.S. Senate (1975–2023) ==
=== Early career (1975–1987) ===
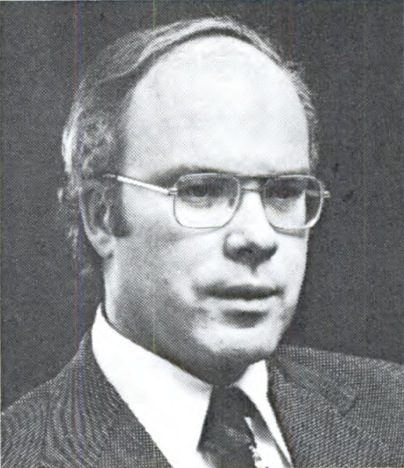
Leahy in 1979

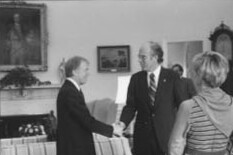
Leahy with President Jimmy Carter in December 1978

Leahy originally aspired to the governorship, but in 1974 ran for the United States Senate in the wake of the Watergate scandal that had resulted in President Richard Nixon's resignation in August of that year. He won a close race against Republican Congressman Richard W. Mallary to succeed the retiring George Aiken. At age 34, Leahy was the youngest U.S. senator in Vermont history, the first non-Republican senator from Vermont since 1856, and the first Democrat to represent Vermont in the chamber. (Note: Prior to 1856, Vermont's U.S. Senators were members of the Anti-Administration, Democratic-Republican, Federalist, Anti-Jacksonian, and Whig parties. From 1856 to 1975, all Vermont's U.S. senators were Republicans.) In 1980, Leahy defeated Republican Stewart Ledbetter by only 2,700 votes amid Ronald Reagan's landslide victory in the presidential election. In 1986, he faced what was on paper an even stronger challenge from former Governor Richard Snelling, but Leahy turned it back, taking 63 percent of the vote. In 1992, Vermont Secretary of State Jim Douglas held him to 54 percent of the vote. After that, Leahy did not face a strong Republican challenger.

In May 1981, Leahy and Senator Ted Kennedy requested that the Senate reject John Crowell Jr.'s nomination as Assistant Agriculture Secretary. Leahy said his opposition was "because documents have been uncovered since his approval by the Agriculture Committee which suggest that he was aware of and involved in the anti-competitive and monopolistic practices of his former employer." Leahy and Kennedy contended that Crowell concealed his involvement with Louisiana-Pacific, Panhandle Logging Company, and Ketchikan Spruce Mills during the confirmation process. Crowell was confirmed by the Senate.

In October 1981, Leahy introduced an amendment that would have increased the Energy Department's enforcement budget by $13 million. He called the Reagan administration's cuts to the enforcement budget "de facto amnesty" for violations made by alleged increases in prices for oil companies. The amendment was defeated in the Senate on October 28 by a vote of 48 to 43. On December 2, 1981, Leahy voted for an amendment to Reagan's MX missiles proposal that would divert the silo system by $334 million, as well as earmark further research for other methods that would allow giant missiles to be based. The vote was seen as a rebuff of the Reagan administration. In March 1982, Leahy was named to the Senate Select Committee to Study Law Enforcement Undercover Activities of the Department of Justice, an eight-member select committee formed to investigate undercover operations. The resolution introducing the committee was the result of Harrison A. Williams's resignation for his involvement in the Abscam sting operation. On December 23, 1982, Leahy voted for a five-cent per gallon increase on gasoline taxes across the U.S. to finance highway repairs and mass transit. The bill passed on the last day of the 97th United States Congress. On October 19, 1983, Leahy voted for a bill establishing Martin Luther King Jr. Day. Reagan signed the legislation the next month. In March 1984, Leahy voted against a proposed constitutional amendment authorizing periods in public school for silent prayer, and against Reagan's unsuccessful proposal for a constitutional amendment permitting organized school prayer in public schools.

=== Senate Agriculture Committee and other activities (1987–1999) ===
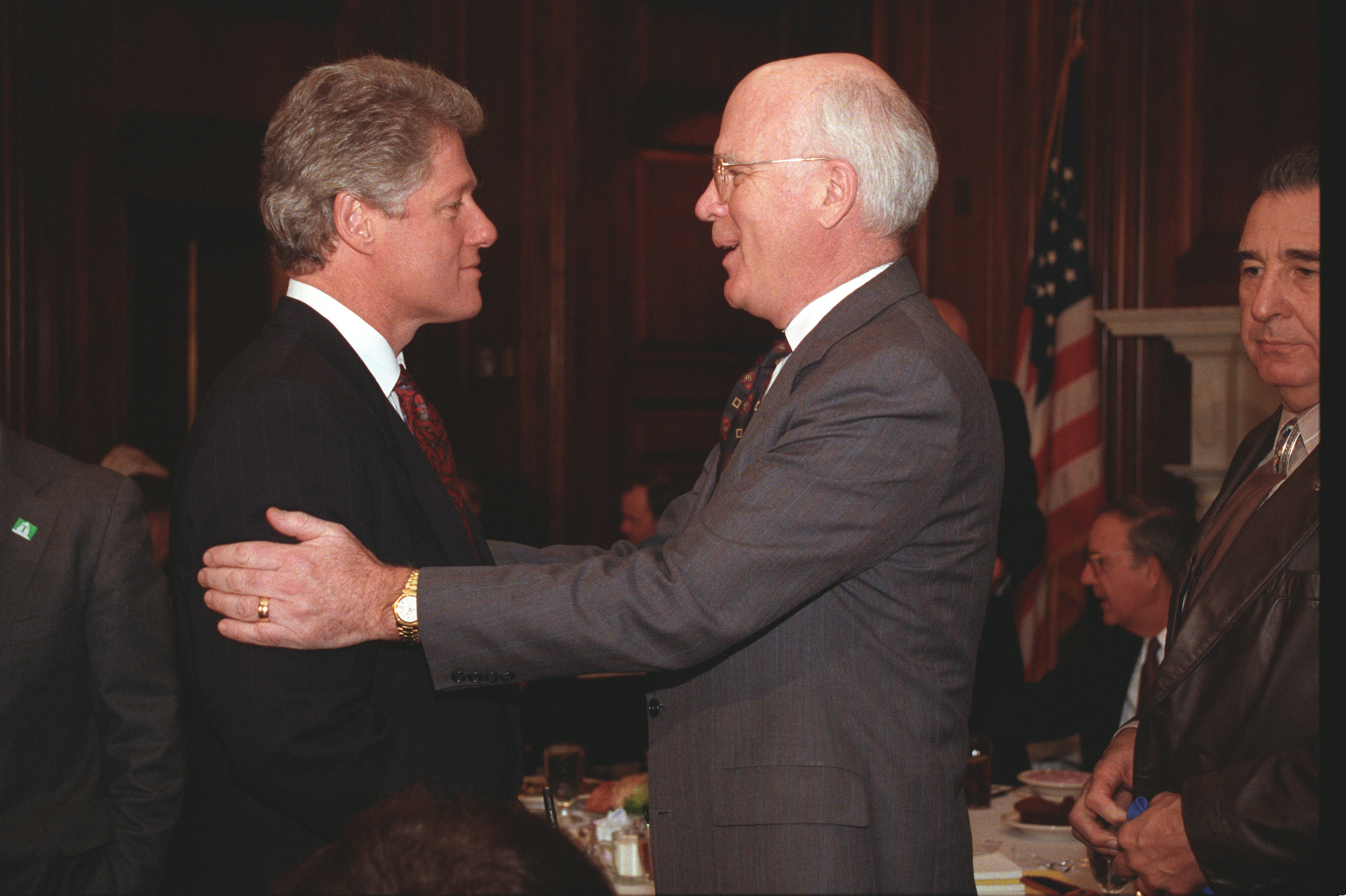
Leahy with President Bill Clinton in February 1993

Leahy was appointed chair of the Senate Agriculture Committee on January 3, 1987. During his tenure as vice-chair of the United States Senate Select Committee on Intelligence in 1987, Leahy showed a news reporter an unclassified draft report on the Iran–Contra affair. At a press conference afterward, Leahy said, "Even though it was declassified, I was way too careless about it" and accepted blame. Disclosure of that information was against Intelligence Committee rules; Leahy said he hastened his already planned departure from the committee because he was so angry at himself.

Later that year, as a member of the Senate Judiciary Committee, Leahy said that if Reagan could not produce an acceptable Supreme Court nominee (Note: Senate Democrats noted several proposed nominees, most emphatically Pasco Bowman II and John Clifford Wallace, as unacceptable immediately following Bork's rejection.) to replace Lewis F. Powell Jr., after Robert Bork was rejected and Douglas Ginsburg withdrew, Senate Democrats would refuse hearings for any nominee until after the 1988 presidential election.

In May 1989, Leahy urged the Agriculture Department to withdraw the proposals regarding the reduction of federal inspections.

In May 1990, he and Representative Dan Glickman introduced the Consumer Seafood Safety Act, a bill that would have strengthened fish inspections. Leahy has been active in the international effort to ban the production, export, and use of anti-personnel land mines. In 1992, he penned a bill to prohibit the export of land mines, the first law of its kind.

In February 1992, the George H. W. Bush administration and Israeli officials struggled to strike a deal that would entice both sides to proceed with a loan guarantee package. After a meeting between Secretary of State James Baker and Zalman Shoval failed to generate a compromise, Baker informed Leahy of the meeting's contents and Leahy announced that he would introduce his own plan if the U.S. and Israel could not come to an agreement in the following weeks. Later that month, the Bush administration announced the U.S. would present Israel with loan guarantees only if the Israeli government halted settlement building. Leahy supported the measure and introduced his own proposal that retained the $10 billion in loan guarantees, but "disbursed at a pace up to $2 billion a year for five years".

On November 20, 1993, Leahy voted for the North American Free Trade Agreement. The agreement linked the U.S., Canada, and Mexico into a single free trade zone, and was signed into law on December 8 by President Bill Clinton. Clinton publicly weighed reducing funding for The Emergency Food Assistance Program (TEFAP) by half. In March 1994, during a news conference, Leahy pledged that he would preserve funding for TEFAP, noting his 1987 lawsuit against Agriculture Secretary Richard Edmund Lyng and declaring that TEFAP maintained the same level of significance as it did then. In August 1994, Leahy attended a news conference with the health advocacy group Public Voice, as it urged the federal government to take more ambitious steps to increase the healthiness of school lunches. He praised the 41 schools involved with Public Voice for setting a good example for the rest of the country and cited the importance of school lunches to education. The 1994 midterm elections resulted in a Republican majority in the House for the first time since the 1950s, and conversation arose of limiting feeding programs. Leahy remarked, "Not since the Great Depression has the possibility of millions of children lining up at soup kitchens been so real." He cosponsored legislation with Indiana Republican Richard Lugar that led to the downsizing of the Agriculture Department. In December 1994, the department announced it was closing 1,274 field offices around the US, a scaling back that was estimated to save over $3 billion over the next five years. Leahy said the Agriculture Department was the only federal agency to succeed in its downsizing efforts and called on other agencies to follow its example. In 1994, Leahy introduced legislation to encourage schools to ban soft drinks and other food items of "minimal nutritional value", saying, "These vending profits go for good causes. But when it comes to vending machine junk food, it would be better to put pupils ahead of vending profits." The bill overcame opposition from The Coca-Cola Company and other representatives of the beverage industry, as well as some education organizations, and was enacted.

In October 1999, Leahy voted for the Comprehensive Test Ban Treaty. The treaty was designed to ban underground nuclear testing and was the first major international security pact to be defeated in the Senate since the Treaty of Versailles.

=== 1999 to 2009 ===
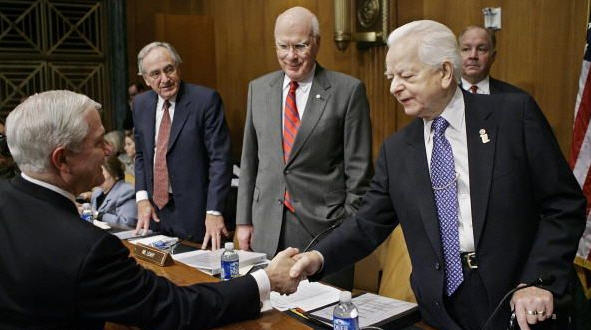
Former Committee Chairman Robert Byrd (D-West Virginia, far right) shakes hands with Secretary of Defense Robert Gates, while Senators Patrick Leahy (D-Vermont, center right) and Tom Harkin (D-Iowa) look on. The hearing was held to discuss further funding for the War in Iraq.

The 1998 United States Senate election in Vermont was noteworthy, in that Republican candidate Fred Tuttle endorsed Leahy. Tuttle was a retired farmer and the lead actor in the mock documentary film Man with a Plan, shot in Vermont, in which a farmer decides to run for Congress. After winning the Republican nomination in a campaign designed both to promote the movie and to mock ostensible GOP frontrunner Jack McMullen, who had only recently moved to Vermont from Massachusetts, Tuttle recommended that voters support Leahy. Leahy was touched by this gesture; he and Tuttle made several joint appearances during the campaign, and Leahy said of Tuttle that he was the "distilled essence of Vermonthood".

The September 11 attacks on the World Trade Center shifted American foreign policy focus to terrorism. In December 2006, during an appearance at the law school of Georgetown University, Leahy said that after the September 11 attacks, "the White House accelerated its power plays at the expense of the other branches of government, all in the name of fighting terrorism." He added that the administration had declined to answer "the legitimate oversight questions of the public's duly elected representatives", as well as broken the law by wiretapping Americans without warrants. On September 13, 2002, Leahy said in a radio interview that an investigation should be launched into whether the West Nile virus was a biological terrorism effort. During a July 1, 2007, interview, Leahy said he was not against lawful eavesdropping and recommended a revision to the Federal Intelligence Surveillance Act, so potential terrorists could be investigated without question. Leahy added that the White House had been subpoenaed, so George W. Bush administration officials could explain "the legal justification they tried to follow when, for years, they wiretapped ordinary Americans and everyone else put out a warrant." Leahy was one of two senators targeted in the 2001 anthrax attacks. The anthrax letter meant for him was intercepted before it reached his office. In 2004, Leahy was awarded the Electronic Privacy Information Center's Champion of Freedom Award, for efforts in information privacy and open government. He is regarded as one of the leading privacy advocates in Congress. In 2000, Leahy cosigned a letter sent to Appropriations Committee conference members, requesting a delay in implementing Section 304 in H.R. 4392, the Intelligence Authorization Act for Fiscal Year 2001, until it could be fully considered by the Senate Committee on the Judiciary. The amendment would introduce new felony crime laws, concerning the unauthorized disclosure of information. Leahy and his colleagues indicated this would be in conflict with existing First Amendment rights and Whistleblower Protection Acts. On June 22, 2004, Leahy and Vice President Dick Cheney participated in the U.S. Senate class photo. After the vote, Cheney was talking to only Republicans. When Leahy asked him to come over and talk to the Democrats, Cheney upbraided Leahy for the Senator's recent excoriations of Halliburton's activities in Iraq. At the end of the exchange, Cheney told Leahy, "Go fuck yourself." Leahy joked about the incident in 2007, when he escorted Bernie Sanders, Vermont's newly elected senator, to the well of the Senate where he was sworn in by Cheney: "When it comes to the vice president, it's always better to be sworn in than to be sworn at."

Leahy opposed the invasion of Iraq in 2003, and writes in his 2022 memoir that he found files with information that contradicted Dick Cheney's public statements about Iraq after mysterious joggers whose identities he did not know told him to request specific files.

2006 dismissal of U.S. attorneys controversy
- Timeline
- Summary of attorneys
- Congressional hearings
- List of dismissed attorneys
- All related articles

In March 2004, Leahy and Senator Orrin Hatch introduced the Pirate Act, backed by the Recording Industry Association of America. In July 2004, Leahy and Hatch introduced the INDUCE Act. Both were aimed at combating copyright infringement. On November 2, 2004, Leahy easily defeated his opponent, businessman Jack McMullen, with 70.6 percent of the vote. On September 21, 2005, Leahy announced his support for John Roberts to be Chief Justice of the United States Supreme Court. On January 19, 2006, Leahy announced that he would vote against Judge Samuel Alito, to be a justice of the Supreme Court. He has a mixed record on gun control, being one of the few Senate Democrats to vote against the Brady Bill. He voted for the North American Free Trade Agreement (NAFTA) and is in favor of phasing out farm subsidies. He voted against the Dominican Republic-Central America Free Trade Agreement (CAFTA). Leahy voted for the Defense of Marriage Act and was one of the few in his party to support the ban on intact dilation and extraction procedures. In 2005, Project on Government Oversight, a government watchdog group, presented Leahy and Senator John Cornyn with its first ever Bi-Partisan Leadership Award, in honor of their cooperation on issues of government oversight and transparency, including their co-sponsorship of the OPEN Government Act of 2005, which prevented burying exemptions to the Freedom of Information Act in legislation. On March 2, 2006, Leahy was one of ten senators to vote against the USA PATRIOT Improvement and Reauthorization Act, a bill to extend the USA PATRIOT Act. The Reauthorization Act changed the appointment process for interim United States attorneys, allowing the Attorney General of the United States to make interim appointments without term limit or Senatorial confirmation. This was an aspect of hearings in the dismissal of U.S. attorneys controversy. In March 2007, both houses voted to overturn the interim appointment provision. On January 18, 2007, Leahy received widespread coverage for his cross-examination of Attorney General Alberto Gonzales, about the Maher Arar affair and the extraordinary rendition of Arar to Syria.

=== Later career (2009–2023) ===
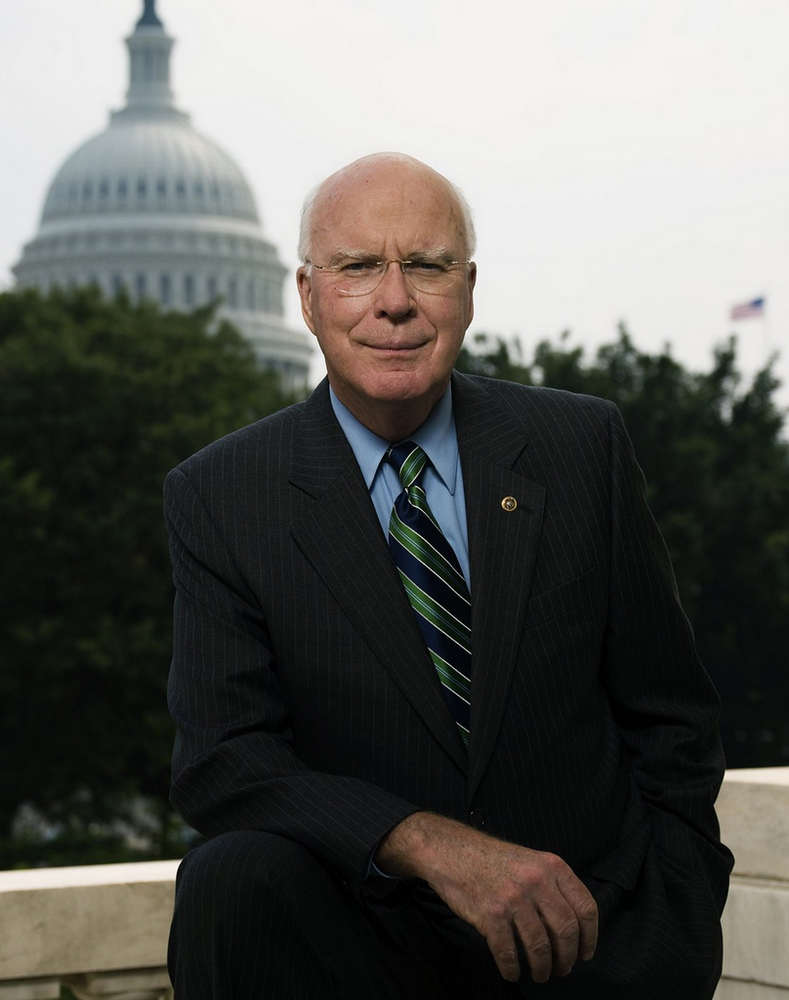
Leahy in 2009

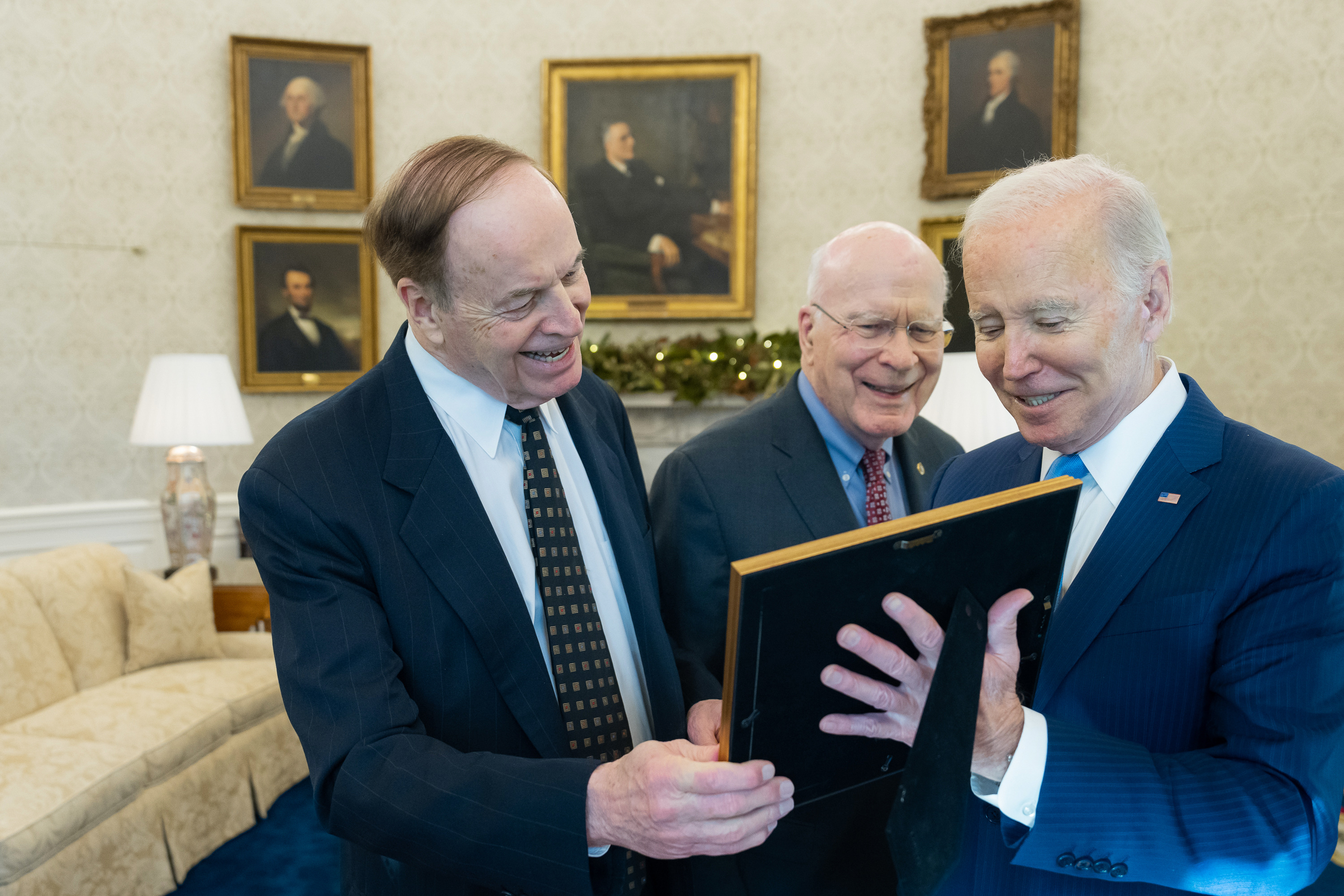
Leahy with President Joe Biden and Richard Shelby in December 2022

Leahy endorsed Barack Obama, the Democratic junior senator from Illinois, in the 2008 presidential election, and recorded a radio advertisement for the Obama campaign to be aired in Vermont.

In May 2009, President Obama nominated Sonia Sotomayor to the Supreme Court. Sotomayor received criticism for having said "I would hope that a wise Latina woman with the richness of her experiences would more often than not reach a better conclusion than a white male who hasn't lived that life." In June, Leahy discussed the remark with Sotomayor and secured her consent to publicly recount their conversation. According to Leahy, the comment meant she believed one's life experiences influence who they are, but that judges of all ethnic backgrounds are still required to follow the law, which is the same for every American. In August, on the day of Sotomayor's confirmation, Leahy defended her record against Republican critics: "Judge Sotomayor's career and judicial record demonstrates that she has always followed the rule of law. Attempts at distorting that record by suggesting that her ethnicity or heritage will be the driving force in her decisions as a justice of the Supreme Court are demeaning to women and all communities of color."

On September 20, 2010, Leahy introduced the Combating Online Infringement and Counterfeits Act, Senate Bill S. 3804, which would allow the court to issue a restraining order or injunction against Internet domain names which infringe upon copyright.

In May 2011, Leahy introduced the Protect IP Act (PIPA) to the Senate. The bill was drafted to give the U.S. government and copyright holders additional tools to fight copyright piracy and counterfeit goods trafficking by foreign rogue websites. Critics of the bill said it would be ineffective, impede free expression on the internet, and interfere with its infrastructure. Leahy subsequently indicated that he would favor further research into provisions that raised objections.

Leahy chaired the Agriculture, Nutrition and Forestry Committee from 1987 until 1995, and the Judiciary Committee from 2001 to 2003 and from 2007 to 2015. He was one of the key Democratic leaders on Senate issues on rules for filling federal judgeships, via advise and consent. Leahy served as second-highest Democrat on the Appropriations Committee and as Chairman of the Appropriations Subcommittee on State, Foreign Operations and Related Programs. In his position as the second-highest Democrat on the Agriculture, Nutrition and Forestry Committee, Leahy chaired the Agriculture Subcommittee on Research, Nutrition and General Legislation.

Upon the death of Senate President pro tempore Daniel Inouye, a Hawaii Democrat, on December 17, 2012, Leahy became the most senior senator in the majority party, and was elected president pro tempore by unanimous consent. He was succeeded in this post by Orrin Hatch on January 3, 2015, and became president pro tempore emeritus.

In February 2013, Leahy was one of 24 senators to sign a letter asserting that Sikh, Hindu and Arab Americans were often targets of violence because they were mistaken for radical Muslims and citing a need for the federal government to "begin tracking information about anti-Sikh, anti-Hindu and anti-Arab hate crimes as soon as possible so that law enforcement can more effectively respond to this threat".

In June 2013, Leahy filed three amendments to an immigration reform package, including one that proposed recognizing same-sex marriages when one spouse is an American. He said implementation of the amendment would end discrimination in the American immigration system and that seeking "equal protection under our laws for the LGBT community is the right thing to do."

According to GovTrack, in 2013, Leahy was the senator who has sponsored the most bipartisan bills. Sixty-one percent of bills he sponsored had both Democratic and Republican co-sponsors.

In January 2015, Leahy headed a congressional delegation to Cuba, meant to "impress upon Cuban leaders the importance of concrete results and positive momentum". It was American officials' first visit to Cuba, since President Obama announced normalized relations between the US and Cuba the previous month.

In July 2015, after the Joint Comprehensive Plan of Action was unveiled, an international agreement on the nuclear program of Iran, Leahy issued a statement saying it was preferable to war and calling it "unfortunate" that some members of Congress opposed the deal as the lack of deal would allow Iran to further develop nuclear weapons.

In January 2017, during a hearing, Leahy asked Jeff Sessions, President-elect Donald Trump's nominee for attorney general, whether he believed grabbing a woman by her genitals without consent was sexual assault, in reference to comments made by Trump on the Access Hollywood tape that had surfaced during the election cycle. Leahy also asked Sessions if he would be able to "prosecute and investigate" a president or elected official who had been accused of committing the aforementioned act.

In April 2017, Leahy was one of 11 senators to cosponsor a bill that would have restored a FCC rule requiring internet service providers to obtain permission from customers before selling data about them to advertisers that had been repealed earlier in the week.

On June 1, 2017, weeks after the firing of FBI Director James Comey, Leahy and Senator Al Franken of Minnesota released a joint statement disclosing their prior request of Comey to investigate all contacts and communications Attorney General Sessions or his aides had with Russian government officials and raised the question of whether Sessions had committed perjury in his Senate testimony.

In September 2017, Leahy was one of eight senators to vote against the National Defense Authorization Act (NDAA), a defense policy bill that included $640 billion in base defense spending and $60 billion in war funds.

In November 2017, Leahy was one of ten Democratic senators to sign a letter urging Prime Minister of Israel Benjamin Netanyahu to halt the planned demolitions of Palestinian villages Khan al-Ahmar and Sussiya, on the grounds that such action would further impede efforts to seek a two-state solution and "endanger Israel's future as a Jewish democracy".

On January 18, 2018, Leahy announced he would not support the stopgap measure for the fiscal year to avert a government shutdown, saying the House bill left "too much undone, and it is woefully inadequate". Leahy added that bipartisan support for the bill would only come from collaborating with Democrats and charged Republicans with "appealing for our support only after they've written a mishmash bill crafted behind closed doors". After the United States federal government shutdown of January 2018 commenced, Leahy was one of 18 senators to vote against temporary funding.

In February 2018, Leahy was one of four senators to sign a letter to United States Secretary of Defense James Mattis requesting that the Pentagon estimate the cost of and time needed to assemble President Trump's requested military parade, calling the parade seemingly "inappropriate and wasteful" at a time of war.

In March 2018, Leahy wrote a letter to Senate Judiciary Committee Chairman Chuck Grassley in which he expressed his fear that "the damage being done to the FBI, and to our nation's institutions more broadly, will far outlast any current crises unless we take decisive, bipartisan action" and requested an oversight hearing on the Trump administration's criticisms of the FBI and Justice Department.

In September 2018, as the Senate weighed the first spending package for the 2019 fiscal year, Leahy advocated for increasing the spending cap for a veterans' care program. When this proposal was not implemented in the final version of the package, which consisted of military construction and veterans' affairs, legislative branch, and energy and water, Leahy warned the decision would leave the VA choice program unfunded.

In October 2018, Leahy, along with Senate Foreign Relations Committee Chairman Bob Corker, ranking Democrat on the Foreign Relations Committee Bob Menendez, and Lindsey Graham, sent President Trump a letter requesting that he begin an investigation of the disappearance of Saudi journalist Jamal Khashoggi, under the Global Magnitsky Human Rights Accountability Act. The letter asked Trump to report the findings within 120 days, along with a decision on whether to impose sanctions on those found responsible. Later that month, Leahy was one of eight senators to sign a letter to Director of National Intelligence Dan Coats requesting a classified briefing on what the American intelligence community knew about threats to Khashoggi, so that the senators may fulfill their "oversight obligation" as members of Congress. In March 2019, Leahy was one of nine Democratic senators to sign a letter to Salman of Saudi Arabia requesting the release of human rights lawyer Waleed Abu al-Khair and writer Raif Badawi, women's rights activists Loujain al-Hathloul and Samar Badawi, and Dr. Walid Fitaih. The senators wrote, "Not only have reputable international organizations detailed the arbitrary detention of peaceful activists and dissidents without trial for long periods, but the systematic discrimination against women, religious minorities and mistreatment of migrant workers and others has also been well-documented."

In December 2018, after United States Secretary of State Mike Pompeo announced the Trump administration would suspend its obligations in the Intermediate-Range Nuclear Forces Treaty in 60 days, if Russia continued to violate the treaty, Leahy was one of 26 senators to sign a letter expressing concern over the administration's "now abandoning generations of bipartisan U.S. leadership around the paired goals of reducing the global role and number of nuclear weapons and ensuring strategic stability with America's nuclear-armed adversaries" and calling on President Trump to continue arms negotiations.

After Minnesota Representative Rick Nolan retired from Congress in 2019, Leahy became the only remaining Watergate baby in Congress.

Leahy endorsed fellow Vermont Senator Bernie Sanders's 2020 presidential campaign.

In May 2021, POLITICO reported that Leahy was "leaning toward [running for a ninth term]" and asking his Senate colleagues for support. On November 15, 2021, Leahy announced that he was not running for a ninth term. Upon the death of Representative Don Young on March 18, 2022, Leahy and Chuck Grassley became the longest-serving current members of Congress. (Note: Grassley served in the House from 1975–1981, and in the Senate beginning in 1981.) Leahy's last term ended in January 2023, and he was succeeded by Peter Welch; he was the last United States senator to have served in the 1970s. (Note: Chuck Grassley and Ed Markey, whose Senate service continued after Leahy's, were members of the U.S. House in the 1970s.) He was also the last Senator to have served from the presidency of Gerald Ford.

=== Committee assignments ===
- Committee on Agriculture, Nutrition and Forestry
  - Subcommittee on Rural Revitalization, Conservation, Forestry and Credit
  - Subcommittee on Production, Income Protection and Price Support
  - Subcommittee on Hunger, Nutrition and Family Farms
- Committee on Appropriations (chair)
  - Subcommittee on Agriculture, Rural Development, Food and Drug Administration, and Related Agencies
  - Subcommittee on Commerce, Justice, Science, and Related Agencies
  - Subcommittee on Defense
  - Subcommittee on Homeland Security
  - Subcommittee on Interior, Environment, and Related Agencies
  - Subcommittee on State, Foreign Operations, and Related Programs
- Committee on the Judiciary
  - Subcommittee on Border Security and Immigration
  - Subcommittee on Intellectual Property
  - Subcommittee on Oversight, Agency Action, Federal Rights and Federal Courts
- Committee on Rules and Administration

=== Nomination for UN General Assembly ===
In September 2022, Leahy was nominated as a representative of the United States to the Seventy-seventh session of the United Nations General Assembly.

== Political positions ==
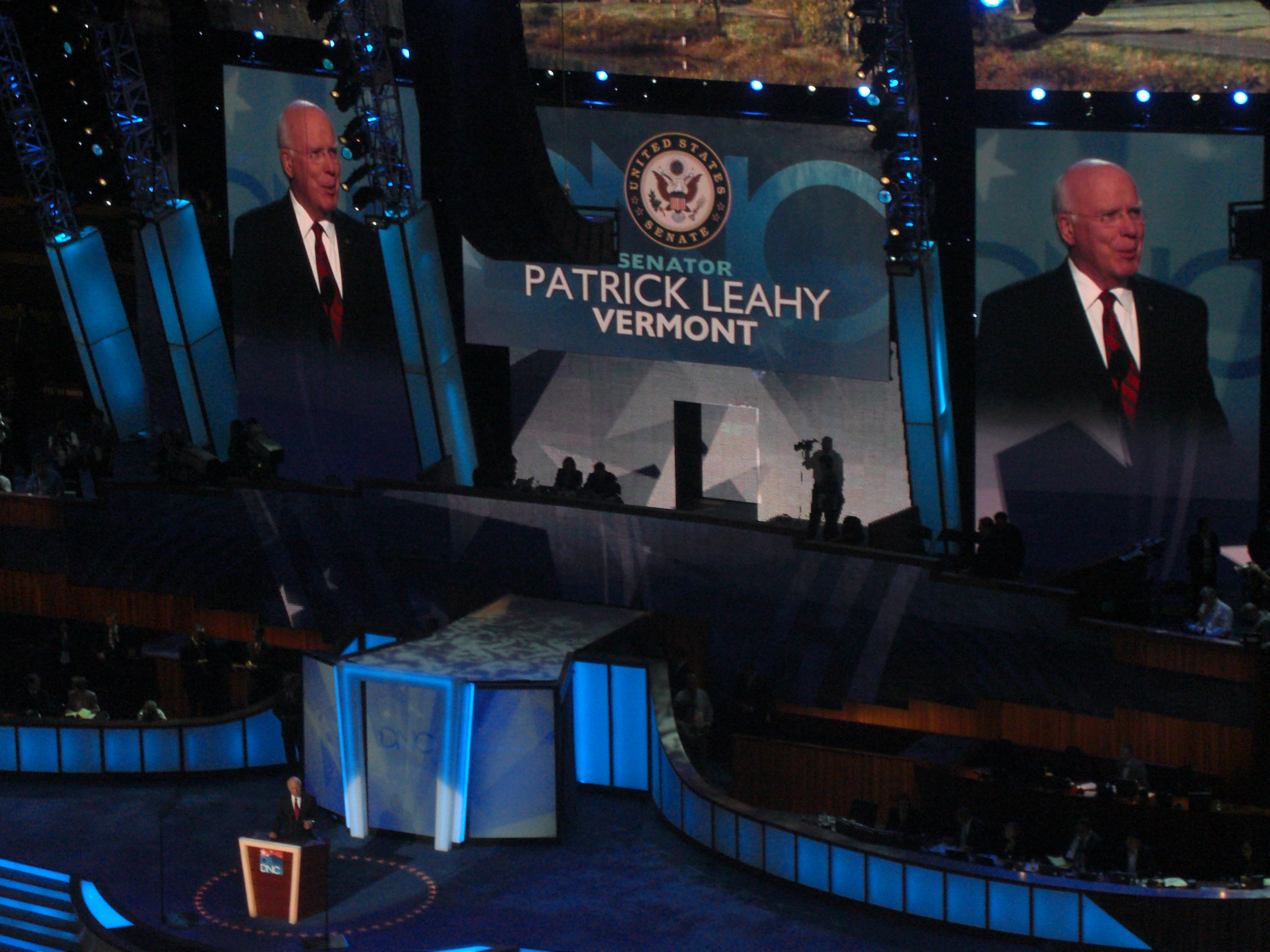
Leahy speaking during the second day of the 2008 Democratic National Convention in Denver, Colorado

Leahy has held progressive political positions that are generally in line with those of the state.

=== Abortion ===
Leahy has supported abortion rights, rejecting proposals to limit minors or those stationed on military bases from having the procedure performed. He voted against the Partial-Birth Abortion Ban Act in 1995 and for it between 1997 and 2003.

On March 11, 1982, Leahy voted against a measure sponsored by Orrin Hatch that sought to reverse Roe v. Wade and allow Congress and individual states to adopt laws banning abortions. Its passing was the first time a congressional committee supported an anti-abortion amendment.

=== Agriculture ===
In 2019, Leahy worked with Senators Sherrod Brown, Susan Collins, and David Perdue on a bipartisan effort to ensure students have access to local foods. The proposal would bolster the Farm to School Grant Program, administered by the Agriculture Department, and raise the program's authorized level from $5 million to $15 million, in addition to furthering the maximum grant award to $250,000.

In March 2019, Leahy was one of 38 senators to sign a letter to Agriculture Secretary Sonny Perdue warning that dairy farmers "have continued to face market instability and are struggling to survive the fourth year of sustained low prices", and urging his department to "strongly encourage these farmers to consider the Dairy Margin Coverage program".

In May 2019, Leahy and eight other Democratic senators sent Perdue a letter that criticized the USDA for using farm bailout money to purchase pork from the Brazilian-owned JBS USA, writing that it was "counterproductive and contradictory" for foreign companies to receive "U.S. taxpayer dollars intended to help American farmers struggling with this administration's trade policy". The senators requested that the department "ensure these commodity purchases are carried out in a manner that most benefits the American farmer's bottom line—not the business interests of foreign corporations."

In June 2019, Leahy and 18 other Democratic senators sent USDA Inspector General (IG), Phyllis K. Fong, a letter requesting that she investigate USDA instances of retaliation and political decision-making, and arguing that to not conduct an investigation would mean these "actions could be perceived as a part of this administration's broader pattern of not only discounting the value of federal employees, but suppressing, undermining, discounting, and wholesale ignoring scientific data produced by their own qualified scientists."

=== Antitrust, competition, and corporate regulation ===
In June 2019, Leahy was one of six Democrats, led by Amy Klobuchar, who signed letters to the Federal Trade Commission (FTC) and the Department of Justice recounting that many of them had "called on both the FTC and the Justice Department to investigate potential anticompetitive activity in these markets, particularly following the significant enforcement actions taken by foreign competition enforcers against these same companies", and requesting that each agency confirm whether it had opened antitrust investigations into each of the companies and that each agency pledge to publicly release any such investigation's findings.

=== Cannabis ===
Leahy supports states' rights to make their own cannabis laws. He proposed a companion to the Rohrabacher-Farr Amendment, which would extend protections to states that have legalized cannabis in some form. It became known as the Leahy Amendment, and prevents the federal government from spending federal tax dollars to prosecute people who are following their state's cannabis laws.

=== Child care ===
In 2019, Leahy was one of 35 senators to have introduced the Child Care for Working Families Act, a bill that created 770,000 new child care jobs and ensured that families making less than 75 percent of the state median income did not pay for child care, with higher earning families having to pay "their fair share for care on a sliding scale, regardless of the number of children they have". The legislation also supported universal access to high-quality preschool programs for all three- and four-year-olds, changed compensation for the child care workforce, and provided training to aid both teachers and caregivers.

=== China ===
In a September 12, 2019, press release, Leahy condemned the persecution of Falun Gong practitioners in China and contended that the Chinese Communist Party views Falun Gong as a threat to its survival. He also argued that the Chinese government should commit to ending the use of torture, organ harvesting of prisoners, and propaganda against minorities.

=== Civil justice ===
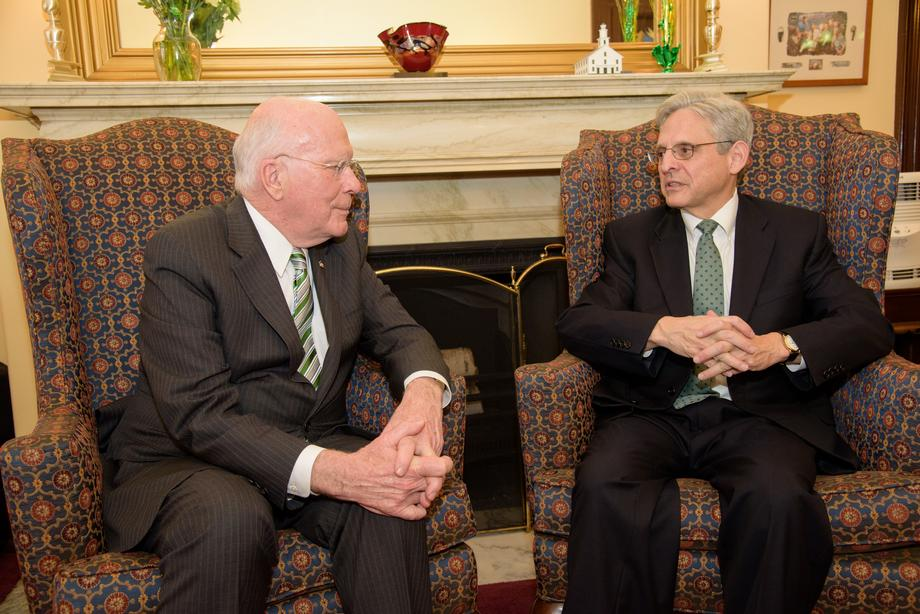
Senator Leahy with Circuit Judge Merrick Garland, March 2016

In February 2016, Leahy introduced the "Restoring Statutory Rights Act", to "prevent companies from imposing forced arbitration in cases covered by consumer protection laws, as well as employment discrimination and other civil rights matters".

=== Civil rights and privacy ===
Leahy has been supported by the NAACP and is outspoken in his support for affirmative action. He has supported the legalization of gay marriage and reducing discrimination against gays and lesbians. Leahy has called for the domestic partners of federal employees to receive the same benefits as heterosexual couples.

Leahy is a lead sponsor of the Senate version of the Email Privacy Act, which would reform the Electronic Communications Privacy Act of 1986 and enhance privacy protections for email. He sponsored this bipartisan bill with Republican Mike Lee of Utah.

=== Criminal justice ===
Leahy has called for a moratorium on the death penalty and for more DNA testing for death row inmates. He supports rehabilitation as the goal of prisons and providing treatment, instead of punishment, for first-time offenders.

In February 2015, Leahy and Republican Rand Paul revived the Justice Safety Valve Act, legislation granting federal judges authority to bestow sentences lower than the mandatory punishment in certain cases, where the sentence violates standards for fair punishment as defined elsewhere in American law.

In October 2017, Leahy cosponsored a bill aimed at easing sentences for some nonviolent offenders, such as for drug crimes, while beefing up other tough-on-crime laws. The bill would have abolished the three-strike mandatory life sentence for some repeat drug offenders and authorized enhanced penalties for some individuals with previous convictions for serious violent and drug felonies.

On July 31, 2019, after Attorney General William Barr announced that the federal government would resume carrying out the death penalty, for the first time in over 20 years, Leahy, Cory Booker, and Dick Durbin introduced a bill that would ban the death penalty. Leahy said capital punishment fails "by any objective measure", citing its finality and juries' propensity to mistakenly convict.

=== Defense ===
Leahy was a longtime critic of the Iraq War, and spoke in favor of timetables for troop withdrawal, saying the country needs well-trained employees in both foreign service and private industry to help repair damage to its civilian structure. He has been critical of the PATRIOT Act, even though he has voted to reauthorize altered versions of it. In June 2013, following the disclosure of PRISM and other covert surveillance activities by the National Security Agency, Leahy introduced a bill that would tighten guidelines related to the acquisition of FISA warrants for domestic surveillance and shorten the current FISA authorization by two years.

Leahy has always opposed the opening and operation of the Guantanamo Bay detention camp, and supported punishment of war profiteering.

=== Economy ===
On taxation, Leahy has consistently supported progressive rates. He has rejected proposals to remove the estate tax and alternative minimum tax, and he has spoken out strongly against cutting taxes for the wealthy. Leahy has strongly supported the rights of employees, and has voted to increase the minimum wage and allow for more union organization. He has voted against a free trade proposal, CAFTA, but supported normalizing trade relations with China.

=== Environment ===
Leahy has been a strong supporter of environmental policy. He has supported bills that would increase hydrogen car production, uphold Corporate Average Fuel Economy standards, set a goal of reducing oil consumption by 40 percent in 2025, and increase solar and wind power funding.

=== Climate change ===
In 2011, Leahy voted against limiting EPA's ability to regulate greenhouse gas emissions. In 2013, he voted against a concurrent resolution creating a point of order which would make it harder for Congress to put a price on carbon. In 2015, he voted in support of Obama's Clean Power Plan. On his Climate Change page, he states that "human activity, since the Industrial Revolution, has contributed, in large part, to the changes in climate." He has supported the establishment of greenhouse gas tradeable allowances and has spoken out against the use of ethanol as a solution to rising gasoline prices.

In June 2017, after President Trump announced the US would withdraw from the Paris Agreement, Leahy called the move a "great leap backward", adding that pandering "to a handful of billionaires and special interests would impose huge harm upon our generation, upon future generations, and upon our fragile planet." He said he intended "to ensure that this stroke of the president's pen does not derail Vermonters' hard work and leadership to protect our communities from climate risk, and that it does not deter the entrepreneurs and innovators in Vermont and other states who are expanding the world markets for the clean green energy and conservation technologies that will shape our future."

In February 2019, in response to reports that the EPA intended to decide against setting limits for perfluorooctane sulfonic acid (PFOS) and perfluorooctanoic acid (PFOA) in drinking water, as part of an upcoming national strategy to manage the chemicals, Leahy was one of 20 senators to sign a letter to Acting EPA Administrator, Andrew R. Wheeler, calling on the agency "to develop enforceable federal drinking water standards for PFOA and PFOS, as well as institute immediate actions to protect the public from contamination from additional per- and polyfluoroalkyl substances (PFAS)".

=== Pipelines ===
In October 2016, Leahy was one of five senators to sign a letter to President Obama requesting that the administration halt work on the Dakota Access Pipeline, until the permitting process of the Army Corps could "be transparent and include public notice and participation, formal and meaningful tribal consultation, and adequate environmental review", and stating their support for the "tribes along the pipeline route in their fight against the Dakota Access pipeline project".

=== First Amendment ===
Leahy spoke strongly against a proposed constitutional ban on flag burning and on its implications for freedom of speech and expression. He rejects school prayer initiatives.

=== Gun control ===
Leahy has supported gun control, including requiring background checks at gun shows and allowing for lawsuits against firearms manufacturers. He voted in favor of prohibiting foreign and UN aid that inhibits gun ownership.

In January 2019, Leahy was one of 40 senators to introduce the Background Check Expansion Act, a bill that would require background checks for either the sale or transfer of all firearms, including unlicensed sellers. Exceptions to the bill's background check requirement included transfers between members of law enforcement, loaning firearms for either hunting or sporting events on a temporary basis, giving firearms to members of one's immediate family, firearms being transferred as part of an inheritance, or giving a firearm to another person temporarily for immediate self-defense.

In February 2019, Leahy was one of 38 senators to sign a letter to Senate Judiciary Committee Chairman Lindsey Graham calling on him to "hold a hearing" on universal background checks and noting Graham's statement in the press that he "intended to have the Committee work on 'red flag' legislation and potentially also background checks, both actions" the senators indicated their support for.

=== Health care ===
Leahy has stated the importance of increasing the prevalence of public health care, during times of economic downturn. He voted to increase Medicare benefits and to allow this organization to negotiate lower-priced, bulk prescriptions from pharmaceutical manufacturers. Leahy has broken with Democratic leadership in supporting allowing states to make bulk drug purchases on their own, an idea he has characterized as an important short-term solution until Congress can agree on a similar proposal.

In a May 2012 speech on the Senate floor, Leahy advocated that Chief Justice John Roberts uphold the constitutionality of the Affordable Care Act: "The conservative activism of recent years has not been good for the court. Given the ideological challenge to the Affordable Care Act and the extensive, supportive precedent, it would be extraordinary for the Supreme Court not to defer to Congress in this matter that so clearly affects interstate commerce."

In March 2017, after House Republicans withdrew the American Health Care Act, Leahy released a statement touting the accomplishments of the Affordable Care Act and charging Republicans with trying to undo the record with a bill that was really "a massive tax cut for the wealthiest Americans".

In September 2017, Leahy was one of 16 senators to co-sponsor the Medicare for All Act, introduced by his fellow Vermont Senator Bernie Sanders, which would establish a single-payer healthcare system in the United States.

In December 2018, Leahy was one of 42 senators to sign a letter to Trump administration officials Alex Azar, Seema Verma, and Steve Mnuchin arguing that the administration was improperly using Section 1332 of the Affordable Care Act to authorize states to "increase health care costs for millions of consumers while weakening protections for individuals with pre-existing conditions". The senators requested the administration withdraw the policy and "re-engage with stakeholders, states, and Congress".

In February 2019, Leahy and 22 other Democratic senators introduced the State Public Option Act, a bill that would authorize states to form a Medicaid buy-in program for all residents and thereby grant them the ability to buy into a state-driven Medicaid health insurance plan if they wished. Brian Schatz, a bill cosponsor, said the legislation would "unlock each state's Medicaid program to anyone who wants it, giving people a high-quality, low-cost public health insurance option" and that its goal was "to make sure that every single American has comprehensive health care coverage".

=== Immigration ===
In February 2018, after the Supreme Court declined to immediately consider the Deferred Action for Childhood Arrivals program, Leahy said that Congress should have acted on immigration reform the previous year, and urged Congress to act, while admitting the Supreme Court decision had reduced pressure to pass legislation quickly.

In June 2018, Leahy, Kirsten Gillibrand, and Joni Ernst wrote a letter to Defense Secretary James Mattis saying they were "deeply troubled by the department's decision to send 21 active and reserve JAGs to the border on temporary orders to prosecute immigration cases", expressing the view that dispatching "twenty-one trial counsel from military courtrooms to prosecute immigration cases is an inappropriate misapplication of military personnel", and urging Mattis to maintain the military lawyers within the military justice system.

In August 2018, Leahy was one of 17 senators to sign a letter to Homeland Security Secretary Kirstjen Nielsen demanding that the Trump administration take immediate action in attempting to reunite 539 migrant children with their families, citing each passing day of inaction as intensifying "trauma that this administration has needlessly caused for children and their families seeking humanitarian protection".

In September 2018, after nearly $10 million of the Federal Emergency Management Agency budget was transferred to US Immigration and Customs Enforcement, Leahy said in a statement, "I am hopeful that the administration will see the consequences of its actions and begin to work with Republicans AND Democrats to actually address the problems in our immigration system. Fomenting fears against immigrants is not governing—it's demagoguery on the taxpayer's dime. It needs to stop now."

In January 2019, Leahy was one of 20 senators to sponsor the Dreamer Confidentiality Act, a bill banning the Department of Homeland Security (DHS) from passing information collected on DACA recipients to Immigration and Customs Enforcement (ICE), Customs and Border Protection (CBP), the Department of Justice, or any other law enforcement agency with exceptions in the case of fraudulent claims, national security issues, or non-immigration related felonies.

In July 2019, following reports that the Trump administration intended to cease protecting spouses, parents and children of active-duty service members from deportation, Leahy was one of 22 senators, led by Tammy Duckworth, to sign a letter arguing that the protection gave service members the ability "to fight for the United States overseas and not worry that their spouse, children, or parents will be deported while they are away" and that its termination would both cause service members personal hardship and negatively affect their combat performance.

=== Internet privacy ===
In April 2017, after President Trump signed a law undoing a Federal Communications Commission rule requiring internet service providers to obtain their customers' permission to sell their data to advertisers, Leahy was one of 11 senators to sponsor legislation undoing the repeal and reinstating the regulations.

=== Iran ===
In May 2018, Leahy was one of 12 senators to sign a letter to Trump urging him not to withdraw from the Iran nuclear deal, on the grounds that "Iran could either remain in the agreement and seek to isolate the United States from our closest partners, or resume its nuclear activities" if the U.S. pulled out and that both possibilities "would be detrimental to our national security interests".

=== Israel ===
Leahy has signed resolutions in support of Israel's right to self-defense, but has also been critical of alleged human rights violations in the region, especially after the 2008 Operation Cast Lead.

In 2011, Leahy initially promoted a bill to cut the military aid to three elite IDF units after reports of human rights violations during the 2010 Gaza flotilla raid and in the West Bank and Gaza Strip.

In February 2016, Leahy joined ten House of Representatives members asking the State Department to investigate suspected human rights violations by Egyptian and Israeli security forces, in particular citing claims of extrajudicial killings that could trigger the Leahy Law, which can cause the suspension of American military aid to countries guilty of such abuses.

In April 2019, after the Trump administration refused to distribute money to West Bank and Gaza "because of perceived intransigence on peace talks by the Palestinians and payments to the families of those who have attacked Israelis", Leahy was one of six Democratic senators to introduce a resolution restoring U.S. humanitarian aid to the West Bank and Gaza.

In May 2020, Leahy voiced his opposition to Israel's plan to annex parts of the occupied Palestinian territories.

=== Opioids ===
In March 2017, Leahy was one of 21 senators, led by Ed Markey, to sign a letter to Senate Majority Leader Mitch McConnell that said that 12% of adult Medicaid beneficiaries had some form of a substance abuse disorder, that one-third of treatment for opioid and other substance use disorders in the U.S. is financed by Medicaid, and that the American Health Care Act could "very literally translate into a death spiral for those with opioid use disorders" due to inadequate funding, often resulting in individuals abandoning substance use disorder treatment.

=== LGBTQIA+ issues ===
In October 2018, Leahy was one of 20 senators to sign a letter to Secretary of State Mike Pompeo urging him to reverse the rolling back of a policy that granted visas to same-sex partners of LGBTQIA+ diplomats who had unions that were not recognized by their home countries, writing that too many places around the world have seen LGBTQIA+ individuals "subjected to discrimination and unspeakable violence, and receive little or no protection from the law or local authorities", and that refusing to let LGBTQIA+ diplomats bring their partners to the US would be equivalent of upholding "the discriminatory policies of many countries around the world". Leahy supported the Student Non-Discrimination Act and supported an LGBTQIA+-supportive amendment in the Runaway and Homeless Youth and Trafficking Prevention Act; the former addresses bullying based on gender identity and sexual orientation, while the latter prevents shelters from discriminating based on the same. Leahy claims that both of these issues disproportionately impact the LGBTQIA+ community.

=== North Korea ===
In June 2018, Leahy was one of seven Democrats to sign a letter cautioning Trump that they would not support lifting sanctions against North Korea unless a nuclear agreement between it and the US met five standards outlined in the letter. In a statement after the North Korea–United States summit, Leahy commended Trump "for beginning direct negotiations" but added that it was troubling that Trump "agreed to unilaterally halt military exercises with South Korea without verifiable commitments from North Korea to denuclearize, while giving Kim the recognition he has long craved."

=== Russia ===
In December 2010, Leahy voted for the ratification of New START, a nuclear arms reduction treaty between the United States and the Russian Federation obliging both countries to have no more than 1,550 strategic warheads and 700 launchers deployed during the next seven years, and providing for a continuation of on-site inspections that halted when START I expired the previous year. It was the first arms treaty with Russia in eight years.

In February 2017, Leahy was one of 11 senators to sign a letter to United States Attorney General Jeff Sessions expressing their concern "about credible allegations that the Trump campaign, transition team, and Administration has colluded with the Russian government, including most recently the events leading to the resignation of Lieutenant General Michael Flynn as National Security Adviser". The senators requested the creation of "an independent Special Counsel to investigate collusion with the Russian government by General Flynn and other Trump campaign, transition and Administrative officials", in order to maintain "the confidence, credibility and impartiality of the Department of Justice".

=== Other issues ===
Leahy has consistently voted to uphold Social Security and has opposed school vouchers.

Leahy supported Joe Biden's plan to withdraw all U.S. troops from Afghanistan.

== Honors and awards ==
In 2013, Leahy received the annual U.S. Senator John Heinz Award for Greatest Public Service by an Elected or Appointed Official from the Jefferson Awards for Public Service. In 2014, the Congressional Management Foundation awarded Leahy a "Silver Mouse Award" for his website, and a "Gold Mouse Award" for his engagement on social media.

Leahy is the recipient of several honorary degrees, including:

- Saint Michael's College, LL.D., 1976
- Middlebury College, LL.D., 2011
- Albany College of Pharmacy, D.Sc., 2013
- Green Mountain College, LL.D., 2014
- University of Portland, D.P.S., 2023

After Leahy retired from the Senate in 2023, Mayor Miro Weinberger announced that Burlington International Airport would be renamed for Leahy. Leahy expressed gratitude following the announcement, saying, "I am gratified that the airport where I took my first flight as a teenager is now well-positioned for Vermont's future."

In 2023 he was awarded an Honorary OBE from the British Government for services to UK/USA relations.

== Personal life ==
=== Family ===
Leahy married Marcelle Pomerleau in 1962. Her parents, Louis Philippe Pomerleau and Cecile Bouchard Pomerleau, emigrated to the United States from Quebec, and she is bilingual (English and French). The extended Pomerleau family established several successful Vermont businesses, and includes her uncle Antonio Pomerleau (d. 2018), a prominent real estate developer and philanthropist. Marcelle Leahy graduated from the nursing school at Burlington's former DeGoesbriand Hospital. She is a registered nurse and has worked at hospitals in Burlington, Washington, D.C., and Arlington, Virginia. The Leahys have resided in a farmhouse in Middlesex, Vermont, since moving from Burlington, and have three children. Their daughter Alicia is married to White House photographer Lawrence Jackson. In 2012, they celebrated their 50th wedding anniversary, with Leahy saying, "We hate it when we're apart from one another." They celebrated their 60th anniversary in August 2022, which was acknowledged by Chuck Grassley when he offered a tribute to Leahy on the Senate floor in December.

=== Health ===
On January 26, 2021, Leahy was hospitalized "out of an abundance of caution" after feeling ill. His hospitalization occurred hours after he had been sworn in as the presiding officer for Trump's second impeachment trial. He returned home later the same day.

On June 29, 2022, Leahy fractured his hip after falling at his home in McLean, Virginia. He underwent hip replacement surgery the next day, and had a second operation related to his hip injury on July 19, 2022.

Leahy was hospitalized again on October 13, 2022, after feeling unwell. He was kept overnight for "tests and observation" and discharged the following day.

=== Interests and views ===
Leahy is a published photographer and author. He is a Roman Catholic and attends Saint Andrew's Church in Waterbury, Vermont. He also attends Holy Trinity Catholic Church in Washington, D.C.

Leahy is a self-proclaimed Deadhead, estimating that he has attended around a half-dozen Grateful Dead shows, and was pictured backstage at a performance in 1994.

=== Comic book fan ===
Leahy is a fan of comic books, and in particular the character Batman. He wrote the foreword to The Dark Knight Archives, Volume 1 (a 1992 collection of the first four Batman comic books), the preface essay for Batman: Death of Innocents (a 1996 graphic novel about the horrors of landmines), and the introduction to Green Arrow: The Archer's Quest (a single-volume collection of a six-issue story arc).

Leahy has also made several cameo appearances in Batman television episodes and films, beginning with an uncredited cameo in Batman Forever (1995). He voiced a territorial governor in the Batman: The Animated Series episode "Showdown" (1995), appeared as himself in the film Batman & Robin (1997), and appeared twice in Christopher Nolan's Dark Knight Trilogy as a Wayne Enterprises board member. In The Dark Knight (2008) he appeared as a fundraiser guest who confronts the Joker. In The Dark Knight Rises (2012), he defended the legacy of the Wayne family against attempts to usurp the company by industrialist John Daggett. Leahy also appeared in Batman v Superman: Dawn of Justice, playing Senator Purrington, in a scene set during Superman's Senate hearing which is subsequently destroyed by an explosion.

All royalties and fees from Leahy's roles are donated to charities, primarily the Kellogg-Hubbard Library in Vermont, where he learned to read as a child.

=== UVM distinguished fellow ===
In March 2023, the University of Vermont (UVM) announced that Leahy had joined the university as a president's distinguished fellow. In this position, he participates in research and academic and engagement projects he initiated while in the Senate. He has also been assigned roles as an advisor and mentor to students and faculty members, a classroom guest lecturer, and a university representative at public events. In addition, he serves as liaison between UVM and organizations and communities throughout Vermont.

In May 2023, UVM announced that it had named its Honors College for Leahy. The Honors College was founded in 2004, and is intended to host original research, innovative teaching, and student-faculty collaborations. It stresses the importance of experiential learning as a way to aid students in developing into original thinkers and compassionate leaders.

In August 2023, UVM announced that Leahy had donated his personal Senate papers to it. The collection of about 1,000 boxes and approximately 20 terabytes of data will be part of UVM's Jack and Shirley Silver Special Collections Library. After sorting and cataloguing, the Leahy Papers will be available to students, faculty, and the public.

== Filmography ==
Year	Title	Role	Notes	Ref.
1995	Batman Forever	Himself	Uncredited cameo	
1995	Batman: The Animated Series	Territorial Governor	Voice; Episode: "Showdown"	
1997	Batman & Robin	Himself	Cameo	
2008	The Dark Knight	Wayne Enterprises board member	Cameo	
2012	The Dark Knight Rises	Wayne Enterprises board member	Cameo	
2016	Batman v Superman: Dawn of Justice	Senator Purrington	Cameo	

== Electoral history ==
Almanac

United States Congressional Service
Years	Congress	Chamber	Senate Majority	Senate Vice President	Constituency
1975-77	94th	U.S. Senate	Democratic	Nelson Rockefeller	Vermont
1977-79	95th	U.S. Senate	Democratic	Walter Mondale	Vermont
1979-81	96th	U.S. Senate	Democratic	Walter Mondale	Vermont
1981-83	97th	U.S. Senate	Republican	George H.W. Bush	Vermont
1983-85	98th	U.S. Senate	Republican	George H.W. Bush	Vermont
1985-87	99th	U.S. Senate	Republican	George H.W. Bush	Vermont
1987-89	100th	U.S. Senate	Democratic	George H.W. Bush	Vermont
1989-91	101st	U.S. Senate	Democratic	Dan Quayle	Vermont
1991-93	102nd	U.S. Senate	Democratic	Dan Quayle	Vermont
1993-95	103rd	U.S. Senate	Democratic	Al Gore	Vermont
1995-97	104th	U.S. Senate	Republican	Al Gore	Vermont
1997-99	105th	U.S. Senate	Republican	Al Gore	Vermont
1999-2001	106th	U.S. Senate	Republican	Al Gore	Vermont
2001-03	107th	U.S. Senate	Democratic(until January 20, 2001) Republican (January 20, 2001 - June 30, 2001) Democratic (from June 6, 2001)	Dick Cheney	Vermont
2003-05	108th	U.S. Senate	Republican	Dick Cheney	Vermont
2005-07	109th	U.S. Senate	Republican	Dick Cheney	Vermont
2007-09	110th	U.S. Senate	Democratic	Dick Cheney	Vermont
2009-11	111th	U.S. Senate	Democratic	Joe Biden	Vermont
2011-13	112th	U.S. Senate	Democratic	Joe Biden	Vermont
2013-15	113th	U.S. Senate	Democratic	Joe Biden	Vermont
2015-17	114th	U.S. Senate	Republican	Joe Biden	Vermont
2017-19	115th	U.S. Senate	Republican	Mike Pence	Vermont
2019-21	116th	U.S. Senate	Republican	Mike Pence	Vermont
2021-23	117th	U.S. Senate	Democratic	Kamala Harris	Vermont

Electoral results

1974 U.S. Senate election in Vermont
Primary election
Party	Candidate	Votes	%
Democratic	Patrick Leahy	19,801	83.9%
Democratic	Nathaniel Frothingham	3,703	15.7%
None	Scattering	97	0.4%
Total votes		23,601	100%
General election
Democratic	Patrick Leahy	70,629	49.48
Republican	Richard W. Mallary	66,223	46.39
Liberty Union	Bernie Sanders	5,901	4.13
Total votes		142,753	100.00
Democratic gain from Republican			

1980 U.S. Senate election in Vermont
Primary election
Party	Candidate	Votes	%
Democratic	Patrick Leahy (incumbent)	27,548	100.00
Total votes		27,548	100.00
General election
Democratic	Patrick Leahy (incumbent)	104,089	49.76
Republican	Stewart M. Ledbetter	101,647	48.59
independent (politician)	Anthony N. Doria	1,764	0.84
Liberty Union	Earl S. Gardner	1,578	0.75
Write-in		110	0.05
Total votes		209,188	100.00
Democratic hold			

1986 U.S. Senate election in Vermont
Primary election
Party	Candidate	Votes	%
Democratic	Patrick Leahy (incumbent)	21,255	100.00
Total votes		21,255	100.00
General election
Democratic	Patrick Leahy (incumbent)	124,123	63.16
Republican	Richard Snelling	67,798	34.50
Conservative	Anthony N. Doria	2,963	1.51
Liberty Union	Jerry Levy	1,583	0.81
Write-in		65	0.03
Total votes		196,532	100.00
Democratic hold			

1992 U.S. Senate election in Vermont
Primary election
Party	Candidate	Votes	%
Democratic	Patrick Leahy (incumbent)	24,721	100.00
Total votes		24,721	100.00
General election
Democratic	Patrick Leahy (incumbent)	154,762	54.16
Republican	Jim Douglas	123,854	43.35
Liberty Union	Jerry Levy	5,121	1.79
Freedom for LaRouche	Michael B. Godeck	1,780	0.62
Write-in		222	0.08
Total votes		285,739	100.00
Democratic hold			

1998 U.S. Senate election in Vermont
Primary election
Party	Candidate	Votes	%
Democratic	Patrick Leahy (incumbent)	18,643	100.00
Total votes		18,643	100.00
General election
Democratic	Patrick Leahy (incumbent)	154,567	72.22
Republican	Fred Tuttle	48,051	22.45
Libertarian	Hugh Douglas	4,199	1.96
independent (politician)	Barry M. Nelson	2,893	1.35
Vermont Grassroots	Bob Melamede	2,459	1.15
Liberty Union	Jerry Levy	1,238	0.58
Write-in		629	0.29
Total votes		214,036	100.00
Democratic hold			

2004 U.S. Senate election in Vermont
Primary election
Party	Candidate	Votes	%
Democratic	Patrick Leahy (incumbent)	27,459	94.32
Democratic	Craig Hill	1,573	5.40
Write-in		81	0.28
Total votes		29,113	100.00
General election
Democratic	Patrick Leahy (incumbent)	216,972	70.63
Republican	Jack McMullen	75,398	24.54
Marijuana	Cris Ericson	6,486	2.11
Green	Craig Hill	3,999	1.30
independent (politician)	Keith Stern	3,300	1.07
Liberty Union	Ben Mitchell	879	0.29
Write-in		174	0.06
Total votes		307,208	100.00
Democratic hold			

2010 U.S. Senate election in Vermont
Primary election
Party	Candidate	Votes	%
Democratic	Patrick Leahy (incumbent)	64,756	88.92
Democratic	Daniel Freilich	7,892	10.84
Write-in		175	0.24
Total votes		72,823	100.00
General election
Democratic	Patrick Leahy (incumbent)	151,281	64.32
Republican	Len Britton	72,699	30.91
independent (politician)	Daniel Freilich	3,544	1.51
Marijuana	Cris Ericson	2,731	1.16
independent (politician)	Stephen J. Cain	2,356	1.00
Socialist	Pete Diamondstone	1,433	0.61
independent (politician)	Johenry Nunes	1,021	0.43
Write-in		133	0.06
Total votes		235,198	100.00
Democratic hold			

2016 U.S. Senate election in Vermont
Primary election
Party	Candidate	Votes	%
Democratic	Patrick Leahy (incumbent)	62,249	88.59
Democratic	Cris Ericson	7,596	10.81
Write-in		424	0.60
Total votes		70,269	100.00
General election
Democratic	Patrick Leahy (incumbent)	192,243	61.26
Republican	Scott Milne	103,637	33.03
Marijuana	Cris Ericson	9,156	2.92
independent (politician)	Jerry Trudell	5,223	1.66
Liberty Union	Pete Diamondstone	3,241	1.03
Write-in		309	0.10
Total votes		313,809	100.00
Democratic hold			

== Books ==
- Leahy, Patrick (August 23, 2022). The Road Taken: A Memoir. New York: Simon & Schuster. ISBN 9781982157357. OCLC 1265084645.

== See also ==
- Trump–Ukraine scandal

== Explanatory notes ==
Party political offices
Preceded by George Aiken	Democratic nominee for U.S. Senator from Vermont (Class 3); 1974, 1980, 1986, 1992, 1998, 2004, 2010, 2016	Succeeded by Peter Welch
U.S. Senate
Preceded by George Aiken	U.S. Senator (Class 3) from Vermont; 1975–2023; Served alongside: Robert Stafford, Jim Jeffords, Bernie Sanders	Succeeded by Peter Welch
Preceded by Daniel Patrick Moynihan	Vice Chair of the Senate Intelligence Committee; 1985–1987	Succeeded by William Cohen
Preceded by Jesse Helms	Chair of the Senate Agriculture Committee; 1987–1995	Succeeded by Richard Lugar
Preceded by Richard Lugar	Ranking Member of the Senate Agriculture Committee; 1995–1997	Succeeded by Tom Harkin
Preceded by Joe Biden	Ranking Member of the Senate Judiciary Committee; 1997–2001	Succeeded by Orrin Hatch
Preceded by Orrin Hatch	Chair of the Senate Judiciary Committee; 2001–2003	Succeeded by Orrin Hatch
Preceded by Orrin Hatch	Ranking Member of the Senate Judiciary Committee; 2003–2007	Succeeded by Arlen Specter
Preceded by Arlen Specter	Chair of the Senate Judiciary Committee; 2007–2015	Succeeded by Chuck Grassley
Preceded by Chuck Grassley	Ranking Member of the Senate Judiciary Committee; 2015–2017	Succeeded by Dianne Feinstein
Preceded by Barbara Mikulski	Ranking Member of the Senate Appropriations Committee; 2017–2021	Succeeded by Richard Shelby
Preceded by Richard Shelby	Chair of the Senate Appropriations Committee; 2021–2023	Succeeded by Patty Murray
Political offices
Preceded by Daniel Inouye	President pro tempore of the U.S. Senate; 2012–2015	Succeeded by Orrin Hatch
Preceded by Chuck Grassley	President pro tempore of the U.S. Senate; 2021–2023	Succeeded by Patty Murray
Honorary titles
Preceded by Daniel Inouye	Dean of the U.S. Senate; 2012–2023	Succeeded by Chuck Grassley
Preceded by Daniel Inouye	Most senior Democrat in the U.S. Senate; 2012–2023	Succeeded by Dianne Feinstein
Vacant Title last held by Ted Stevens	President pro tempore emeritus of the U.S. Senate; 2015–2021	Succeeded by Chuck Grassley
Order of precedence
Preceded by Lori Chavez-DeRemer as Former U.S. Cabinet Member	Order of precedence of the United States as Former President pro tempore of the U.S. Senate	Succeeded by George J. Mitchell as Former Senate Majority Leader
