= Vermont Is for Lovers =

Vermont is for Lovers
- Directed by: John O'Brien
- Written by: John O'Brien
- Starring: George Thrush, Marya Cohn, Ann O'Brien, Euclid D. Farnham
- Edited by: John O'Brien
- Release date: 1992
- Running time: 88 min
- Country: United States
- Language: English

Vermont is for Lovers is an independently produced docudrama released in 1992, starring George Thrush and Marya Cohn and shot on location in Tunbridge, Vermont. The film concerns a couple visiting Vermont in order to be married, and interviewing local residents on the subject of marriage. Largely improvised and using non-professional actors, the film was shown at various film festivals including the Melbourne International Film Festival and the Hawaii International Film Festival. The film was not terribly well received by the national press, with The New York Times calling it, "vaguely amiable". While The Washington Post review commented that the film was an "all-too-easy target for ridicule", it also mentioned one of the film's high points: "In one scene, a typically droll Vermont resident (playing himself) sums up his state's fabled coolness to strangers by suggesting that a sign be placed at the state line, reading "Welcome to Vermont. Now Leave.""
