= 2004 United States Senate election in Vermont =

- November 2, 2004
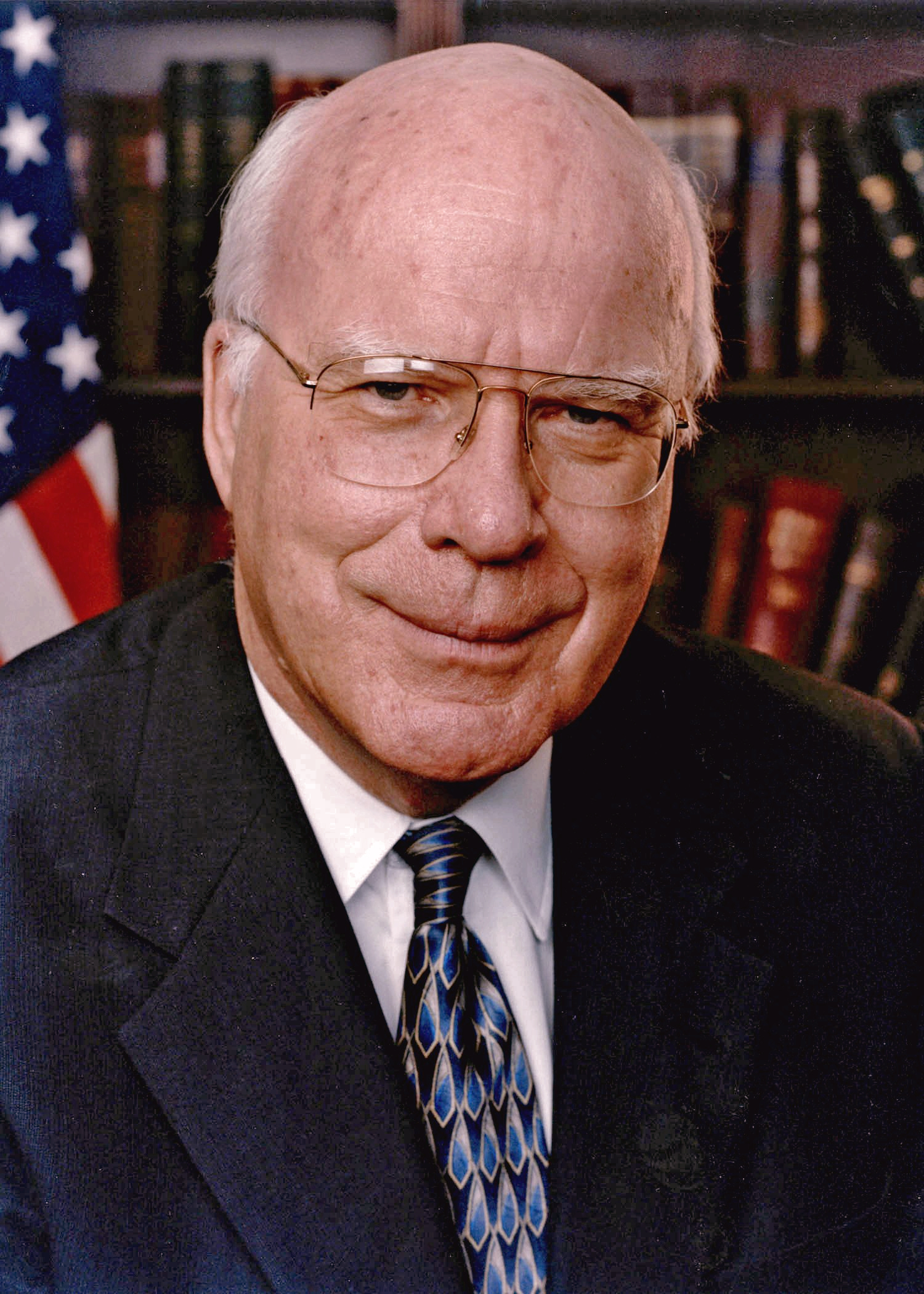

Nominee	Patrick Leahy	Jack McMullen
Party	Democratic	Republican
Popular vote	216,972	75,398
Percentage	70.63%	24.54%
- Leahy: 40–50% 50–60% 60–70% 70–80% 80–90% McMullen: 50–60%
U.S. senator before election
Patrick Leahy
Democratic
Elected U.S. Senator
Patrick Leahy
Democratic

The 2004 United States Senate election in Vermont was held on November 2, 2004. Incumbent Democratic U.S. Senator Patrick Leahy won reelection to a sixth term.

== Democratic primary ==
=== Candidates ===
- Patrick Leahy, incumbent U.S. Senator
- Craig Hill, perennial candidate

=== Results ===
Democratic primary results
Party	Candidate	Votes	%
Democratic	Patrick Leahy (incumbent)	27,459	94.32%
Democratic	Craig Hill	1,573	5.40%
Democratic	Write-ins	81	0.28%
Total votes		29,113	100.00%

== Republican primary ==
=== Candidates ===
- Jack McMullen, businessman
- Peter D. Moss
- Ben Mitchell

=== Results ===
Republican primary results
Party	Candidate	Votes	%
Republican	Jack McMullen	9,591	67.69%
Republican	Peter D. Moss	2,058	14.52%
Republican	Ben Mitchell	1,715	12.10%
Republican	Write-ins	806	5.69%
Total votes		14,170	100.00%

== General election ==
=== Candidates ===
==== Major ====
- Patrick Leahy (D), incumbent U.S. Senator
- Jack McMullen (R), businessman

==== Minor ====
- Cris Ericson (I), perennial candidate
- Craig Hill (G), electronics marketer
- Ben Mitchell (LU)
- Keith Stern (I)

=== Predictions ===
Source	Ranking	As of
Sabato's Crystal Ball	Safe D	November 1, 2004

=== Polling ===
Poll source	Date(s) administered	Sample size	Margin of error	Patrick Leahy (D)	Jack McMullen (R)	Undecided
Research 2000	October 10–12, 2004	403 (LV)	± 5%	67%	21%	12%

=== Results ===
General election results
Party	Candidate	Votes	%	±%
Democratic	Patrick Leahy (incumbent)	216,972	70.63%	−1.59%
Republican	Jack McMullen	75,398	24.54%	+2.09%
Independent	Cris Ericson	6,486	2.11%	
Green	Craig Hill	3,999	1.30%	
Independent	Keith Stern	3,300	1.07%	
Liberty Union	Ben Mitchell	879	0.29%	−0.29%
Write-in	Write-ins	174	0.06%	
Majority		141,574	46.08%	−3.68%
Turnout		307,208	100.0%	
Democratic hold		Swing		

==== By county ====
County	Patrick Leahy Democratic		Jack McMullen Republican		Various candidates Other parties		Margin		Total votes cast
County	#	%	#	%	#	%	#	%	Total votes cast
Addison	13,243	72.3%	4,372	23.9%	690	3.8%	8,871	48.4%	18,305
Bennington	12,179	65.6%	5,136	27.7%	1,256	6.7%	7,043	37.9%	18,571
Caledonia	9,030	64.7%	4,268	30.6%	668	4.8%	4,762	34.1%	13,966
Chittenden	57,688	75.2%	16,290	21.2%	2,715	3.6%	41,398	54.0%	76,693
Essex	1,697	59.9%	923	32.6%	211	7.4%	774	26.3%	2,831
Franklin	14,304	72.6%	4,693	23.8%	679	3.6%	9,611	48.8%	19,706
Grand Isle	2,868	71.4%	1,008	25.1%	139	3.4%	1,860	46.3%	4,015
Lamoille	8,620	71.8%	2,786	23.2%	595	4.9%	5,834	47.6%	12,001
Orange	9,883	67.6%	4,001	27.4%	730	4.9%	5,882	40.2%	14,614
Orleans	8,430	69.8%	3,135	26.0%	504	4.1%	5,295	43.8%	12,069
Rutland	19,175	63.0%	9,812	32.2%	1,471	4.8%	9,363	30.8%	30,458
Washington	23,025	74.1%	6,814	21.9%	1,237	4.0%	16,211	52.2%	31,076
Windham	16,085	70.8%	4,954	21.8%	1,665	7.4%	11,131	49.0%	22,704
Windsor	20,745	68.7%	7,206	23.9%	2,248	7.4%	13,539	44.8%	30,199
Totals	216,972	70.6%	75,398	24.5%	14,838	4.8%	141,574	46.1%	307,208

== See also ==
- 2004 United States Senate elections
