= Nosey Parker =

Nosey Parker is a 2003 film directed by John O'Brien.

== Plot ==
Sick of suburbia, Natalie and Richard Newman move to rural Vermont, where they expect the unspoiled setting and intrinsic values to rejuvenate their marriage. Natalie wants to start a family; Richard, who has grown children from a first marriage, does not. As a compromise they build a trophy house. The construction of the dreamhouse inevitably leads to a visit from the local tax assessor (lister). Enter George Lyford, a lister and farmer, who over the course of two inspections, develops a flirtation with Natalie, which results in his becoming her handyman.

== Cast ==
- Natalie Picoe as Natalie Newman
- George Lyford as George Lyford
- Richard Snee as Richard Newman
