= John O'Brien (filmmaker) =

American politician

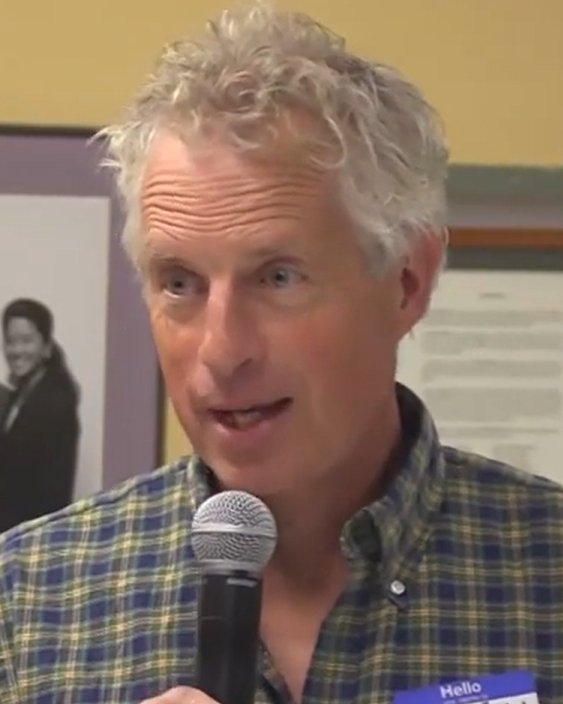
- O'Brien in 2024

Member of the Vermont House of Representatives from the Windsor-Orange-1 District district
- Incumbent
- Assumed office 2019

Personal details
- Born: 1962 (age 63–64) Tunbridge, Vermont, U.S.
- Party: Democratic
- Education: Harvard University

John O'Brien (born 1962) is an American film director, sheep farmer, Justice of the Peace and politician.

== Early life and education ==
O'Brien grew up in Tunbridge, the son of State Senator Bob O’Brien. He attended Chelsea High School and graduated from Harvard University in 1986.

== Film career ==
O'Brien is the director of the Tunbridge Trilogy, three films that focus on the rural life of Tunbridge, Vermont. The director refers to his style of filmmaking as "community cinema" and his films as "anthropological comedies" as his cast consists mostly of local friends and neighbors from Tunbridge who play themselves in fictional stories. The most famous of these, Man with a Plan, starred the dairy farmer and one-time politician, Fred Tuttle. According to O'Brien, the film, in which Tuttle runs successfully for Congress, was inspired by 1979's Being There, a movie in which Peter Sellers plays a gardener named Chance, who becomes a trusted adviser to the presidency. In 2001, it was reported that Man With a Plan had sold 40,000 copies, most of them to Vermonters. O'Brien's other films include Vermont Is for Lovers and Nosey Parker.

== Political career ==
In 2015, O'Brien was elected to the Town of Tunbridge, Vermont selectboard. In 2018 he was the successful Democratic nominee for a seat in the Vermont House of Representatives. He has served in the Windsor-Orange-1 district seat representing Royalton and Tunbridge in the Vermont House since 2019.

== Filmography ==
- The Big Dis (1989)
- Vermont Is for Lovers (1992)
- Man with a Plan (1996)
- Nosey Parker (2003)
