= Man with a Plan (film) =

Man With A Plan
- Directed by: John O'Brien
- Written by: John O'Brien
- Produced by: Richard Morse; John O'Brien; Molly O'Brien; Jack Rowell
- Starring: Fred Tuttle
- Edited by: John O'Brien
- Release date: 1996
- Running time: 89 minutes
- Country: United States
- Language: English
- Box office: ~$1 million

Man With A Plan is a 1996 American comedy drama independent film. The film is a satire and stars dairy farmer and actor Fred Tuttle as himself in a fictional story that finds him running for the U.S. House of Representatives. Since its release, it has remained a local cult classic in Vermont.

Many details of the film can be read as poking fun at certain public figures and groups in Vermont; for example, Fred describes himself as being affiliated with the "Regressive Party," a clear reference to the Vermont Progressive Party. The fictional incumbent Representative William Blachly also bears a definite resemblance to Vermont Senator Patrick Leahy. Parts of the film also satirize American politics in ways that the voice-over narration makes explicit—for example, it is made very clear at the beginning of the film that Fred's main reason in running for office is that he lacks the skills, strength, and education for any other job that would be lucrative enough to pay his father's costly medical bills. It is also made obvious during the campaign section of the film that Fred's victory is entirely the result of his charisma and charm, rather than of any amount of political savvy or wisdom.

Tuttle would go on to run for a seat in the United States Senate in 1998. He won the Republican nomination but was defeated by Democratic incumbent Senator Patrick Leahy, whom Tuttle famously endorsed. Filmmaker John O'Brien is a Vermont state Representative on the House Agriculture Committee.
