= Government of Vermont =

Government of the U.S. state of Vermont

- Logo of the Vermonter government Great Seal of the State of Vermont
- Polity type: Presidential Republic
- Constitution: Constitution of Vermont

Legislative branch
- Name: General Assembly
- Type: Bicameral
- Meeting place: Vermont State House
- Upper house
- Name: Senate
- Presiding officer: John S. Rodgers, President
- Lower house
- Name: House of Representatives
- Presiding officer: Jill Krowinski, Speaker

Executive branch
- Head of state and government
- Title: Governor
- Currently: Phil Scott
- Appointer: Election
- Cabinet
- Name: 7 Executive Agencies
- Leader: Governor
- Deputy leader: Lieutenant Governor
- Headquarters: The Pavilion

Judicial branch
- Name: Judiciary of Vermont
- Vermont Supreme Court
- Chief judge: Paul Reiber
- Seat: Montpelier

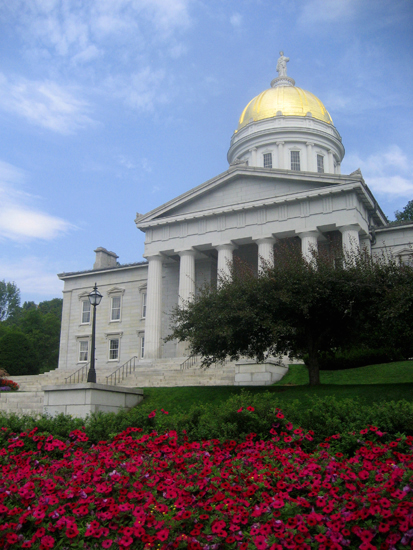
Vermont State House

The government of Vermont is a republican form of government modeled after the Government of the United States. The Constitution of Vermont is the supreme law of the state, followed by the Vermont Statutes. This is roughly analogous to the federal United States Constitution, United States Code and Code of Federal Regulations respectively. Provision is made for the following frame of government under the Constitution of the State of Vermont: the executive branch, the legislative branch, and the judicial branch. All members of the executive and legislative branch serve two-year terms including the governor and senators. There are no term limits for any office.

The Vermont state capital is Montpelier. In 1791, Vermont joined the United States as the fourteenth state.

An in-depth evaluation of government in 2008 ranked Vermont high compared to other states. It ranked highest in "small discrete issues and huge global ones." It performed poorly in the issues in-between and planning for the future.

== Civil rights and liberties ==
The Vermont Constitution guarantees broad rights for its citizens. Adopted in 1793, it contains in its first article ("Declaration of the Rights of the Inhabitants of the State of Vermont") a far-reaching bill of rights, one of the most extensive in the world at the time of its adoption. Predating the ratification of the United States Bill of Rights by 14 years, the 1777 Constitution prohibited slavery and indentured servitude and provided for universal male suffrage, with no property ownership requirement for voting rights. It also set forth broad protections of religious freedom and conscience while erecting a strong separation between church and state by prohibiting establishment or promotion of any faith by the government or compulsion to worship. The "Declaration of the Rights of the Inhabitants of The State of Vermont" is believed to have been a model for France's Declaration of the Rights of Man and of the Citizen later.

== Legislative branch ==
Vermont's state legislature is the Vermont General Assembly, a bicameral body composed of the Vermont House of Representatives (the lower house) and the Vermont Senate (the upper house) meet at the Vermont State House. The Senate is composed of 30 state senators, while the House of Representatives has 150 members.

State legislators are paid $536 per week while the legislature is in session plus $87 per diem.

With the current estimated population of Vermont from the last U.S. Census, there is approximately one Representative for every 4,059 residents.

== Executive branch ==
Elected Executive Officers of Vermont

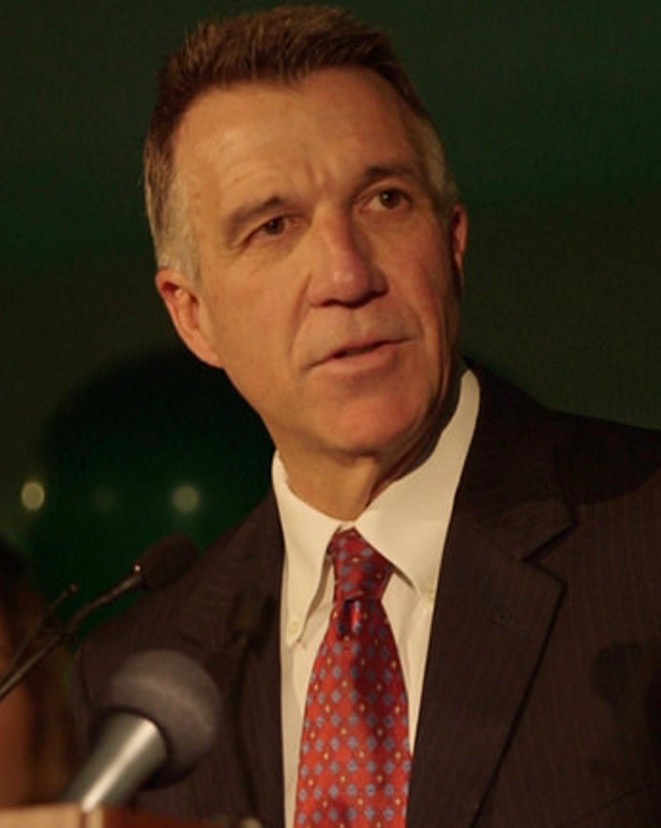
Governor Phil Scott (R)

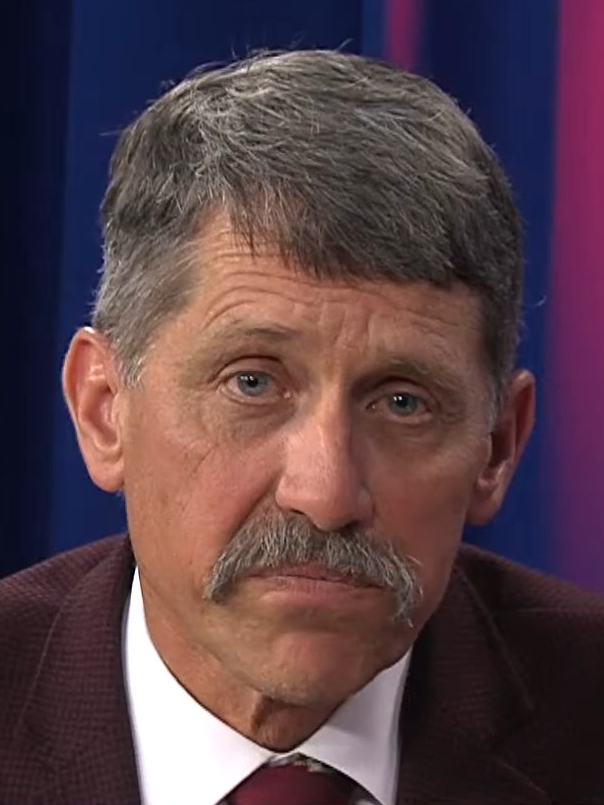
Lieutenant Governor
John S. Rodgers (R)

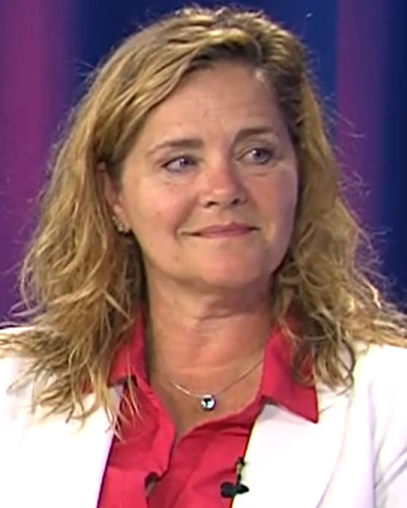
Secretary of State Sarah Copeland-Hanzas (D)

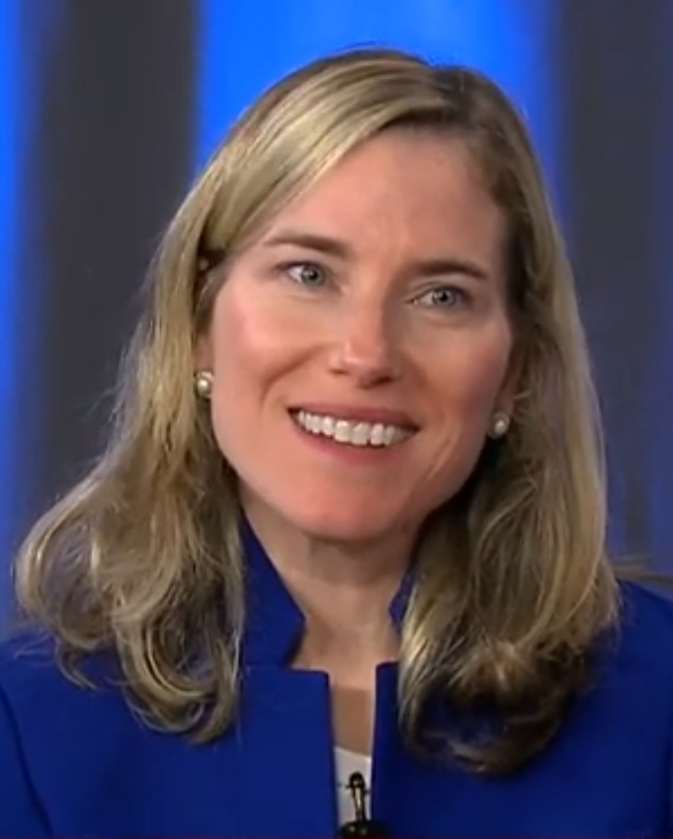
Attorney General Charity Clark (D)

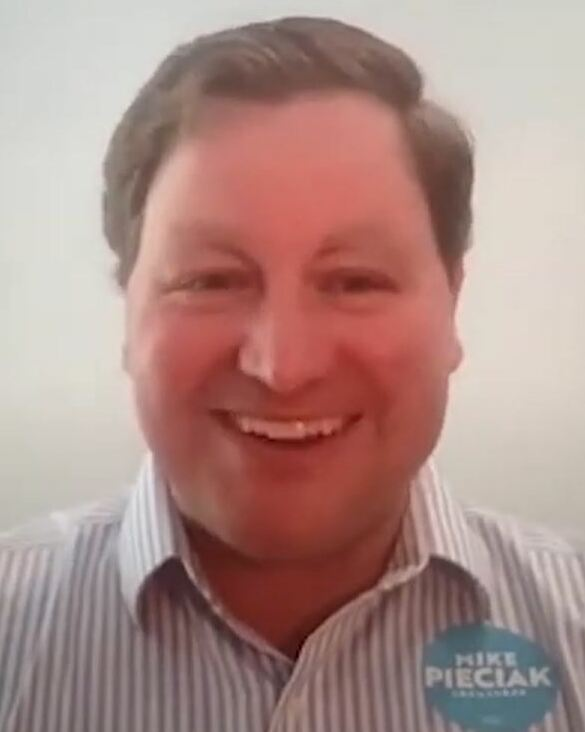
State Treasurer Mike Pieciak (D)

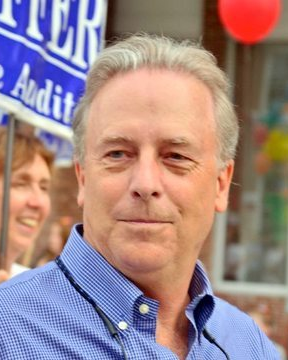
Auditor
Doug Hoffer (P)

The Executive Branch consists of the Governor of Vermont, and state agencies. The executive branch enacts and enforces the laws of the state. The Governor is the supreme executive. The current Governor is Phil Scott, a Republican.

The offices of the Governor are located at The Pavilion in Montpelier, the state capital. The governor is paid a salary of $181,646.40 annually.

Vermonters elect a state governor and lieutenant governor on separate tickets. For example, when Republican Governor Richard Snelling died in office in 1991, the Democratic Lieutenant Governor Howard Dean succeeded him for the remainder of that term. In addition to the Governor and Lieutenant Governor, Vermonters elect four other officials on a statewide ballot: Secretary of State, State Treasurer, Vermont Auditor of Accounts, and Attorney General.

The executive branch had about 8,000 employees in 2005, making it the largest employer in the state. This high number is due, in part, to Vermont (and New England's) practice of assuming the functions, and therefore the budgets of the county government which is nearly non-existent. In 2008, there were 8262 people working for the government. The average salary of a state employee was $50,014 in 2008. In 2010, state employees agreed to take a 3% cut in salary and wages so that the government could balance the budget.

There are three levels of bureaucracy: at the highest are secretaries and agencies; the next level are commissions; the third are departments and offices. Some commissions still retain their old name of "Department", as well as agencies, e.g. "Department of Transportation" is an agency.

There are seven agencies run by appointed secretaries: Administration, Vermont Agency of Agriculture Food and Markets (Agriculture), Commerce and Community Development, Digital Services, Human Services, Natural Resources, and Transportation. The salaries of the secretaries range from $109,000 to $128,169 annually.

There are 21 commissions run by individual appointed commissioners: Aging and Independent Living, Buildings and General Services, Children and Families, Corrections, Disabilities, Economic Development, Education, Finance, Financial Regulation, Fish and Wildlife, Forests, Health, Human Resources, Information and Innovation, Labor, Liquor Control, Mental Health, Motor Vehicles, Parks and Recreation, Public Safety, Public Service, Taxes, and Tourism. The salaries of the commissioners range from $83,387 to $121,596 annually.

The bureaucracy is structured as follows:

The governor, with approval of the legislature, appoints people to boards. Six boards govern the following commissions: a) Banking, Insurance, Securities, and Health Care Administration; b) Education - Run by Vermont State Board of Education; c) Labor; d) Liquor Control; e) Public Safety; and f) Public Service (advocacy).

The remaining commissions are under the following agencies along with various departments as indicated:

- Administration Agency:
  - Buildings and General Services Commission
  - Finance and Management Commission
  - Human Resources Commission
  - Libraries Department
  - Tax Commission
- Agriculture Agency
- Commerce and Community Development Agency:
  - Economic Development Commission
  - Tourism and Marketing Commission
  - Housing and Community Affairs Commission
- Digital Services
- Human Services Agency:
  - Department of Children and Families
  - Department of Corrections
  - Department of Disabilities, Aging and Independent Living
  - Department of Health. The commissioner of health is Harry Chen, M.D.
  - Department of Mental Health.
  - Department of Vermont Health Access
- Natural Resources Agency:
  - Department of Environmental Conservation
  - Fish and Wildlife Commission
  - Forest Parks and Recreation Commission
- Transportation Agency:
  - Highways
  - Motor Vehicles Commission
  - Aeronautics and Public Transit

There are more than 100 transportation-related fees in the state including the usual drivers licenses and vehicle registration.

=== Department of Financial Regulation ===
Among other functions, the Department of Financial Regulation (DFR) regulates individual budgets for Vermont's fourteen hospitals. They approved an average increase for 2007 of 6.3%. The average increase for 2008 was 9.5%. Individual hospitals received approval for increases from 3.8% to 11.8%.

== Judicial branch ==
The state's highest and the sole appellate court is the Vermont Supreme Court made up of five justices who serve six-year terms. The Chief Justice is the head of the judiciary and, with the other justices of the supreme court, oversees the judicial branch. Vermont has three additional courts and one division. Vermont is one of only nine states without an intermediate appellate court.

Appointments to the state supreme court, superior court, and district courts are made by the governor, from a list of names submitted by the state's Judicial nominating committee and then are confirmed by the Senate. At the end of each six-year term, the General Assembly votes by joint ballot (each member, senator or representative, getting one vote) on whether to retain the judge or justice (known as a judicial retention vote). Judges on lower courts are elected on a partisan ballot. The Vermont Constitution spells out the process of judicial appointment and retention in Chapter 2, Sections 32 through 35, 50 and 51.

- The Superior Court is the court of general jurisdiction and the only which provides for jury trials in civil and criminal cases. Superior courts in the state are made up of eight judges serving a term of six years.
- The state's Probate Court has jurisdiction over trusts, wills and estates, adoptions, termination of parental rights, name changes, guardianship of incapacitated persons, guardianship of minors, partition of property and involuntary admissions.
- The District Court hears cases involving families, juveniles, minor crimes and violations, and civil matters under $25,000.
- The Family Division has jurisdiction over divorce, custody/support and domestic violence cases.

Vermont is one of twelve states that have no death penalty statute. After 1930, there were four executions, the last two being in 1954. Capital punishment was effectively abolished in practice in 1964, with the statutes being completely removed in 1987. State law allows children as young as ten years to be tried as adults, the lowest age limit currently specified by any of the 50 states.

The Vermont prison system is administered by Vermont Department of Corrections. There are about 2,200 inmates as of May 2007. There are nine prisons in Vermont:

An unusual feature of Vermont Courts is the use of side judges, elected laymen who sit with the judge in certain cases and also serve as county administrators.

== Finances ==
Vermont is the only state in the union not to have a balanced budget requirement and yet Vermont has had a balanced budget every year since 1991. In 2007, Moody's Investors Service gave its top rating of AAA to the state.

The state uses enterprise funds for operations that are similar to private business enterprises. The Vermont Lottery Commission, the Liquor Control Fund, and the Unemployment Compensation Trust Fund, are the largest of the State’s enterprise funds.

=== Taxes ===
In 2007 Vermont stood 14th highest out of 50 states and the District of Columbia for state and local taxation, with a per capita load of $3,681. The national average was $3,447. However, CNNMoney ranked Vermont highest in the nation based on the percentage of per capita income. The rankings showed Vermont had a per capita tax load of $5,387, 14.1% of the per capita income of $38,306.

Vermont collects personal income tax in a progressive structure of five different income brackets, with marginal tax rates ranging from 3.6% to 9.5%. In 2008, the top one percent of the residents provided 30% of the income tax revenue. 2,000 people had sufficient income to be taxed at the highest marginal rate of 9.5%.

Vermont's general sales tax rate is 6%, which is imposed on sales of tangible personal property, amusement charges, fabrication charges, some public utility charges and some service contracts (some towns and cities impose an additional 1% Local Option Tax). There are 46 exemptions from the tax which include medical items, food, manufacturing machinery, equipment and fuel, residential fuel and electricity, clothing, and shoes. A use tax is imposed on the buyer at the same rate as the sales tax. The buyer pays the use tax when the seller fails to collect the sales tax or the items are purchased from a source where no tax is collected. The use tax applies to items taxable under the sales tax.

Vermont does not collect inheritance taxes; however, its estate tax is decoupled from the federal estate tax laws and therefore the state still imposes its own estate tax.

==== Property taxes ====
Property taxes are imposed for the support of education and municipal services. Vermont does not assess tax on personal property, though individual towns or cities can opt to do so.

Property taxes are levied by municipalities based on fair market appraisal of real property. Rates vary from .97% on homesteaded property in Ferdinand, Essex County, to 2.72% on nonresidents' property in Barre City. Statewide, towns average 1.77% to 1.82% tax rate.

In 2007, Vermont counties were among the highest in the country for property taxes. Chittenden ($3,809 median), Windham ($3,412), Addison ($3,352), and Windsor ($3,327) ranked in the top 100, out of 1,817 counties in the nation with populations greater than 20,000. Twelve of the state's 14 counties stood in the top 20%.

To equitably support education, some towns are required by Act 60 to send some of their collected taxes to be redistributed to school districts lacking adequate support.

The state collects 86 cents per $100 of real estate valuation for residential properties and $1.35 per $100 for commercial and vacation properties.

==== Cigarette taxes ====
In an attempt to raise money and discourage smoking, the state raised taxes on cigarettes over the past decade. The tax in 2002 was 93 cents per pack; in 2010 it was $2.24 per pack. This resulted in cigarette revenue in 2002 of $24.5 million; $64.5 million in 2010.

=== State lottery ===
Money from the Vermont Lottery supplied about 2% of the annual expenditures for education in 2007, contributing $23 million, of the $1.3 billion of school spending. Prior to 1998, profits from the lottery went to the state government's general fund, but since then all profits are required to be spent on education.

== Local government ==
=== County government ===
As in most of New England, Vermont counties have very few autonomous functions. Counties serve mainly as dividing lines for county and state courts, with several countywide elected officers such as a State's Attorney, two Assistant Judges, Probate Judge, Sheriff, and High Bailiff, and five to fifteen Justices of the Peace elected from each municipality within the county. Unlike other states, Vermont counties are not responsible for a road network, old-age homes, or other infrastructure or services. All county services are directly funded by the state via property taxes levied within the constituent towns.

=== Municipal government ===
The 255 geographic county subdivisions in Vermont comprise 242 municipalities with functioning town governments—five of these are inactive governmental entities. Additionally, five such divisions are cities. The three gores and one grant are nonfunctioning, nongovernmental county subdivisions. Towns govern themselves by direct citizen participation via town meeting. Between town meetings, town affairs are managed by a selectboard or a town manager. Additionally, an elected town clerk keeps track of the town's records, manages licenses, convenes civil boards, and runs elections.

As in most of New England, any town that grows too large to be governed by a town meeting can opt for a city form with a mayor and city council. Towns and cities may also have town managers and mayors responsible for the management of municipal affairs. Cities also have a board of aldermen in place of a selectboard.

There are three types of incorporated municipalities in Vermont, towns, cities and villages. As in the other New England states, towns are the basic unit of municipal government. Cities are independent of and equivalent to towns. Villages are included in towns but assume responsibility for some municipal services within their boundaries, usually water, sewage and sometimes local roads. Vermont is the only New England state with incorporated villages.

As is the case in most of New England, nearly every square foot of the state is within the borders of an incorporated municipality; only a few hundred people live in the unincorporated gores.

In 2010, as a result of a Homeland security grant for Operation Stonegarden, various local city police throughout the state were used to help patrol the Canada–US border area for illegal immigrants. The money was managed by the Vermont State Police.

In most New England states, municipal governments derive all of their power from the state, though in practice the laws regarding their authority are so broadly construed that they have the form, if not the substance, of home rule. This is not the case in Vermont. Towns and cities in Vermont are subject to Dillon's Rule, which holds that municipal governments only have the powers that are expressly granted to them by Vermont or federal law, plus any powers that are necessarily implied by the express powers and any powers essential to the municipality's existence. Vermont is one of ten states that does not grant municipalities even limited home rule, and one of three "strict" Dillon's Rule states which impose particularly close limits on municipal power.

== Federal ==
As in the rest of the United States, the state government does not take direction from the federal government. However, the people of Vermont elect representatives to the federal government which pass federal laws and also recommend federal judicial appointments each of which may ultimately affect Vermont citizens.

=== Congressional delegates ===
Based on U.S. census data, Vermont has had one member in the House of Representatives since 1933.

Like all states, Vermont has two senators in the U.S. Senate.

Congressional delegation of Vermont
Chamber	District	Officer	Party	Term start	Term ends
Senate	At-large	Peter Welch	Democrat	2023	2029
Senate	At-large	Bernie Sanders	Independent	2025	2031
House of Representatives	At-large	Becca Balint	Democrat	2025	2027

=== Judicial ===
Federal court cases are handled in the United States District Court for the District of Vermont, which are subject to review by the Second Circuit Court of Appeals headquartered in New York City. By law judges and attorneys are nominated by the President and confirmed by the Senate.

== Joint authority ==
There is at least one agency which is jointly run by the Legislative and Executive branches. This is the Vermont Telecommunications Authority, which is supposed to make high-speed internet access available to all Vermonters by the end of 2010.

== See also ==
- Politics of Vermont
- Elections in Vermont
- Judiciary of Vermont
- Impeachment in Vermont
