= Chittenden-3-6 Vermont Representative District, 2002–2012 =

State Representative district in Vermont, U.S.

Coordinates: 44°29′30″N 73°11′10″W

The Chittenden-3-6 Representative District is a two-member state Representative district in the U.S. state of Vermont. It is one of the 108 one or two member districts into which the state was divided by the redistricting and reapportionment plan developed by the Vermont General Assembly following the 2000 U.S. census. The plan applies to legislatures elected in 2002, 2004, 2006, 2008, and 2010. A new plan will be developed in 2012 following the 2010 U.S. census.

The Chittenden-3-6 District includes all of the Chittenden County city of Winooski, and a section of the city of Burlington defined as follows:

...that portion of the City of Burlington encompassed within a boundary beginning at the northern terminus of the boundary line between the cities of Burlington and South Burlington located at a point adjacent to the Winooski River west of Interstate 89, then southwesterly along the boundary line to the intersection of the boundary line and Grove Street, then northwesterly along Grove Street to the intersection of Chase Street, then southwesterly along Chase Street to the intersection of Colchester Avenue, then southwesterly along Colchester Avenue to the intersection of Mansfield Avenue, then northerly along Mansfield Avenue to the intersection of North Street, then westerly on North Street to the intersection of North Prospect Street, then northerly along North Prospect Street, crossing Riverside Avenue, and continuing along Intervale Road to the intersection of the railroad tracks, then easterly along the railroad tracks to the Winooski River and the boundary of the City of Burlington and the City of Winooski.

— Vermont Statutes, Title 17, Chapter 34, Section 1893a

The rest of Burlington is in Chittenden-3-1, Chittenden-3-2, Chittenden-3-3, Chittenden-3-4 and Chittenden-3-5.

As of the 2000 census, the state as a whole had a population of 608,827. As there are a total of 150 representatives, there were 4,059 residents per representative (or 8,118 residents per two representatives). The two-member Chittenden-3-6 District had a population of 8,174 in that same census, 0.69% above the state average.

== District representatives ==
- Kenneth W. Atkins, Democrat
- Clem Bissonnette, Democrat

== See also ==
- Members of the Vermont House of Representatives, 2005-2006 session
- Vermont Representative Districts, 2002-2012
