= Chittenden-3-7 Vermont Representative District, 2002–2012 =

State Representative district in Vermont, US

Coordinates: 44°26′0″N 73°12′20″W

The Chittenden-3-7 Representative District is a one-member state Representative district in the U.S. state of Vermont. It is one of the 108 one or two member districts into which the state was divided by the redistricting and reapportionment plan developed by the Vermont General Assembly following the 2000 U.S. census. The plan applies to legislatures elected in 2002, 2004, 2006, 2008, and 2010. A new plan will be developed in 2012 following the 2010 U.S. census.

The Chittenden-3-7 District includes a section of the Chittenden County city of South Burlington defined as follows:

That portion of the City of South Burlington starting at a point on Lake Champlain at the Shelburne-South Burlington boundary and following the Shelburne-South Burlington boundary easterly to Shelburne Road; then northerly following Shelburne Road to Allen Road; then easterly following Allen Road to Spear Street; then northerly on Spear Street to Pheasant Way; then westerly on Pheasant Way to Deerfield Drive; then northerly on Deerfield Drive; then easterly on Deerfield Drive to the intersection with Spear Street; then across Spear Street to Nowland Farm Road to the intersection with Pinnacle Drive; then northerly on Pinnacle Drive; then easterly on Pinnacle Drive; then northerly on Pinnacle Drive; then westerly on Pinnacle Drive; then southerly on Pinnacle Drive to the intersection with Olivia Drive; then westerly along Olivia Drive to Spear Street; then northerly on Spear Street to Swift Street; then westerly on Swift Street to Shelburne Road; then westerly along the Burlington-South Burlington boundary to Lake Champlain; then following the shore of Lake Champlain southerly to the point of beginning.

— Vermont Statutes, Title 17, Chapter 34, Section 1893a

The rest of South Burlington is in Chittenden-3-8, Chittenden-3-9, and Chittenden-3-10.

As of the 2000 census, the state as a whole had a population of 608,827. As there are a total of 150 representatives, there were 4,059 residents per representative (or 8,118 residents per two representatives). The one member Chittenden-3-7 District had a population of 3,721 in that same census, 8.33% below the state average.

== District representative ==
- Frank Geier, Democrat

== See also ==
- Members of the Vermont House of Representatives, 2005-2006 session
- Vermont Representative Districts, 2002-2012
