= Chittenden-3-5 Vermont Representative District, 2002–2012 =

State Representative district in Vermont, U.S.

Coordinates: 44°27′45″N 73°12′30″W

The Chittenden-3-5 Representative District is a two-member state Representative district in the U.S. state of Vermont. It is one of the 108 one or two member districts into which the state was divided by the redistricting and reapportionment plan developed by the Vermont General Assembly following the 2000 U.S. census. The plan applies to legislatures elected in 2002, 2004, 2006, 2008, and 2010. A new plan will be developed in 2012 following the 2010 U.S. census.

The Chittenden-3-5 District includes a section of the Chittenden County city of Burlington defined as follows:

Consisting of that portion of the City of Burlington encompassed within a boundary beginning from the shore of Lake Champlain and the boundary line with the City of South Burlington, then easterly along the boundary line between the City of Burlington and the City of South Burlington to Shelburne Street, then northerly and then easterly along the boundary line with the City of South Burlington, then northerly along the boundary line with the City of South Burlington to the intersection of Davis Road, then southwesterly along Davis Road to the intersection of South Prospect Street, then northerly along South Prospect Street to the intersection of Main Street, then westerly along Main Street to the intersection of Willard Street, then southerly along Willard Street to the intersection of Maple Street, then westerly along Maple Street to the intersection of St. Paul Street, then southerly along St. Paul Street to the intersection of Kilburn Street, then westerly along Kilburn Street to the intersection of Pine Street, then southerly along Pine Street to where the railroad track parallels Pine Street, then northwesterly along the railroad track to the intersection of Maple Street, then westerly along Maple Street to the intersection of the shore of Lake Champlain, then southerly along the shore of Lake Champlain to the point of beginning.

— Vermont Statutes, Title 17, Chapter 34, Section 1893a

The rest of Burlington is in Chittenden-3-1, Chittenden-3-2, Chittenden-3-3, Chittenden-3-4 and Chittenden-3-6.

As of the 2000 census, the state as a whole had a population of 608,827. As there are a total of 150 representatives, there were 4,059 residents per representative (or 8,118 residents per two representatives). The two member Chittenden-3-5 District had a population of 8,826 in that same census, 8.72% above the state average.

== District representatives ==
- Johannah Leddy Donovan, Democrat
- Suzi Wizowaty, Democrat

== See also ==
- Members of the Vermont House of Representatives, 2005-2006 session
- Vermont Representative Districts, 2002-2012
