= Jill Krowinski =

American politician (born 1980)

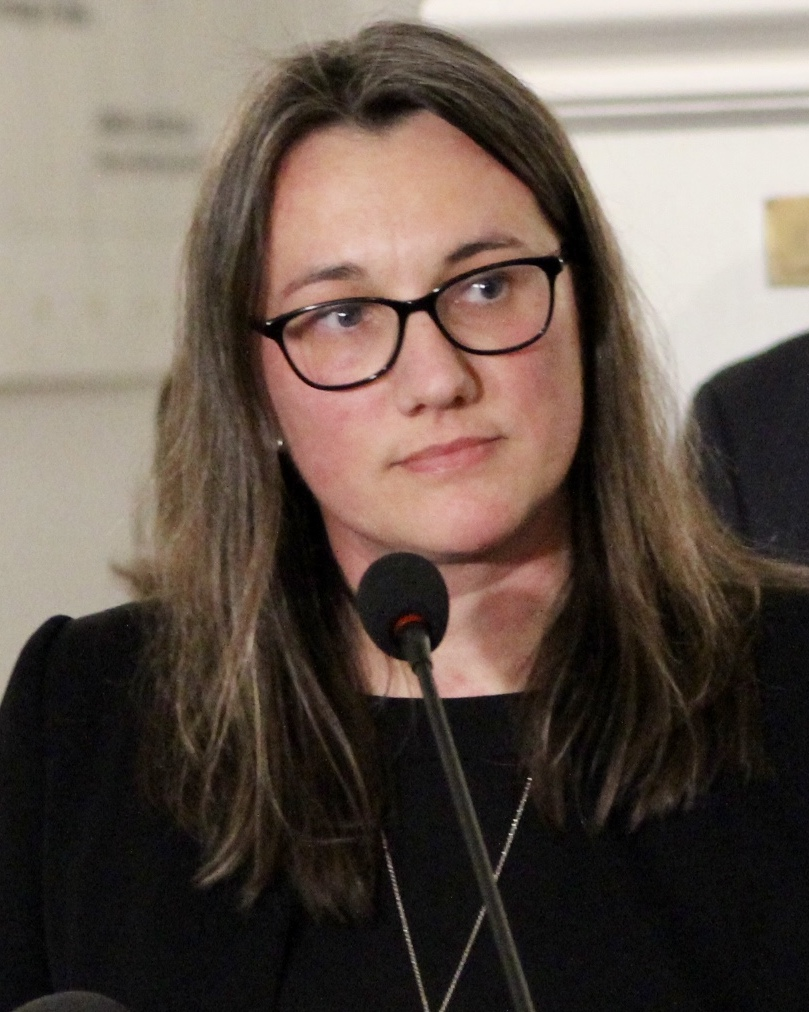

94th Speaker of the Vermont House of Representatives
- Incumbent
- Assumed office January 6, 2021
- Preceded by: Mitzi Johnson

Majority Leader of the Vermont House of Representatives
- In office January 4, 2017 – January 6, 2021
- Preceded by: Sarah Copeland-Hanzas
- Succeeded by: Emily Long

Member of the Vermont House of Representatives
- Incumbent
- Assumed office February 2012
- Preceded by: Rachel Weston
- Succeeded by: Trang Do (elect)
- Constituency: Chittenden 3-3 (2012–2013); Chittenden 6-3 (2013–2023); Chittenden 16 (2023–present)

Personal details
- Born: January 5, 1980 (age 46) Kenmore, New York, U.S.
- Party: Democratic
- Education: University of Pittsburgh (BA)
- Website: Campaign website

Jill Krowinski (born January 5, 1980) is an American politician who has served in the Vermont House of Representatives since 2012. A Democrat, she served as majority leader from 2017 to 2021, and was elected Speaker of the Vermont House of Representatives in 2021.

== Early life ==
Jill L. Krowinski was born in Kenmore, New York on January 5, 1980. She was raised in North Tonawanda, New York and is a 1998 graduate of North Tonawanda High School, where she was a member of the track and field team. She graduated from the University of Pittsburgh in 2002 with a Bachelor of Arts degree in urban studies and political science.

== Political career ==
After her college graduation, Krowinski moved to Vermont to work on 2002 campaigns in Windsor County for 21st Century Democrats, an organization that helps elect Democratic candidates nationwide. She went on to direct the 2004 Democratic campaign effort for seats in the Vermont House of Representatives. Gaye Symington was elected speaker in 2005, and hired Krowinski as her top aide. In 2006, she was field director for the United States House of Representatives campaign of Democratic nominee Peter Welch.

Krowinski served as executive director of Emerge Vermont, which works to increase the number of Democratic women in public office. She also worked as vice president of education and Vermont community affairs for Planned Parenthood of Northern New England. She has also served as an advisory committee member for Emerge Vermont. Krowinski has also been a delegate to the American Council of Young Political Leaders, a nonpartisan organization that promotes cooperation between emerging leaders while also introducing them to international affairs and foreign policy. Krowinski was also a member of the Fletcher Free Library board of commissioners.

=== Vermont House of Representatives ===
In February 2012, Krowinski was appointed by Governor Peter Shumlin to fill a vacancy in the Vermont House of Representatives. She was elected to a full term in 2012, and has been reelected every two years since. After becoming a House member, Krowinski served as an assistant to the majority leader. She was elected majority leader for the session that began in January 2017. In January 2021, she was elected speaker. During her legislative career, Krowinski has held leadership roles on two joint legislative committees, the Health Care Oversight Committee (vice chair) and the Vermont Child Poverty Council (chair).

== Personal life ==
Krowinski is married to Tim Farbisz, an ultrasound technician at the University of Vermont Medical Center in Burlington.

Vermont House of Representatives
Preceded by Sarah Copeland-Hanzas	Majority Leader of the Vermont House of Representatives; 2017–2021	Succeeded by Emily Long
Political offices
Preceded by Mitzi Johnson	Speaker of the Vermont House of Representatives; 2021–present	Incumbent
