= HSGP =

HSGP may refer to:

- High Sierra Group Proposal, a CD-ROM file system proposal by the High Sierra Group in 1985/1986
- Homeland Security Grant Program, to incorporate projects providing funding by the US Department of Homeland Security since 2003
- HSGP Investments, a company, who took over Filofax in 2012
- Humanist Society of Greater Phoenix
