= Chittenden-3-8 Vermont Representative District, 2002–2012 =

State Representative district in Vermont, US

Coordinates: 44°26′3″N 73°9′47″W

The Chittenden-3-8 Representative District is a one-member state Representative district in the U.S. state of Vermont. It is one of the 108 one or two member districts into which the state was divided by the redistricting and reapportionment plan developed by the Vermont General Assembly following the 2000 U.S. census. The plan applies to legislatures elected in 2002, 2004, 2006, 2008, and 2010. A new plan will be developed in 2012 following the 2010 U.S. census.

The Chittenden-3-8 District includes a section of the Chittenden County city of South Burlington defined as follows:

That portion of the City of South Burlington starting at the junction of Dorset Street and the Shelburne-South Burlington boundary and proceeding easterly to the junction of the Shelburne-South Burlington-Williston boundaries; then northerly following the Williston-South Burlington boundary to Williston Road; then continuing westerly to the intersection of Hinesburg Road/Patchen Road; then southerly following Hinesburg Road to Woodcrest Street; then westerly on Woodcrest Street; then northerly on Woodcrest Street; then westerly on Woodcrest Street; then southerly on Woodcrest Street to Dean Street; then easterly on Dean Street to Hinesburg Road; then southerly along Hinesburg Road to Interstate 89; then westerly along Interstate 89 to its intersection with Dorset Street; then southerly to Swift Street; then westerly following Swift Street to Spear Street; then southerly along Spear Street to Olivia Drive; then easterly on Olivia Drive to Pinnacle Drive; then northerly on Pinnacle Drive; then easterly on Pinnacle Drive; then southerly on Pinnacle drive; then westerly on Pinnacle Drive; then southerly on Pinnacle Drive to Nowland Farm Road; then westerly to Spear Street; then across Spear Street to Deerfield Drive; then westerly on Deerfield Drive; then southerly on Deerfield Drive to Pheasant Way; then easterly on Pheasant Way to Spear Street; then southerly along Spear Street to Allen Road; then westerly following Allen Road to the intersection of Shelburne Road; then southerly on Shelburne Road to the Shelburne-South Burlington boundary; then easterly on the Shelburne-South Burlington boundary to the point of beginning at Dorset Street and the Shelburne-South Burlington boundary.

— Vermont Statutes, Title 17, Chapter 34, Section 1893a

The rest of South Burlington is in Chittenden-3-7, Chittenden-3-9, and Chittenden-3-10.

As of the 2000 census, the state as a whole had a population of 608,827. As there are a total of 150 representatives, there were 4,059 residents per representative (or 8,118 residents per two representatives). The one member Chittenden-3-8 District had a population of 3,717 in that same census, 8.43% below the state average. It has the fewest residents per representative of any district in Vermont.

== District representative ==
- Ann D. Pugh, Democrat

== See also ==
- Members of the Vermont House of Representatives, 2005-2006 session
- Vermont Representative Districts, 2002-2012
