= Chittenden-3-9 Vermont Representative District, 2002–2012 =

State Representative district in Vermont, U.S.

Coordinates: 44°28′24″N 73°9′12″W

The Chittenden-3-9 Representative District is a one-member state Representative district in the U.S. state of Vermont. It is one of the 108 one- or two-member districts into which the state was divided by the redistricting and reapportionment plan developed by the Vermont General Assembly following the 2000 U.S. census. The plan applies to legislatures elected in 2002, 2004, 2006, 2008, and 2010. A new plan will be developed in 2012 following the 2010 U.S. census.

The Chittenden-3-9 District includes a section of the Chittenden County city of South Burlington defined as follows:

That portion of the City of South Burlington starting at the junction of the Burlington-South Burlington boundary and Williston Road and following that boundary starting northerly following the city boundary to the Winooski River, then following the South Burlington-Winooski River boundary to Muddy Brook, then following the Muddy Brook-South Burlington boundary to Williston Road, then westerly to Hinesburg Road/Patchen Road, then southerly to Woodcrest Street, then westerly on Woodcrest Street, then northerly on Woodcrest Street, then westerly on Woodcrest Street, then southerly on Woodcrest Street to Dean Street, then easterly on Dean Street to Hinesburg Road, then continuing southerly on Hinesburg Road to Potash Brook, then westerly following the centerline of Potash Brook to the intersection with Kennedy Drive, then westerly on Kennedy Drive to Dorset Street, then northerly on Dorset Street to Williston Road, then westerly to the point beginning at the junction of the Burlington-South Burlington boundary and Williston Road.

— Vermont Statutes, Title 17, Chapter 34, Section 1893a

The rest of South Burlington is in Chittenden-3-7, Chittenden-3-8, and Chittenden-3-10.

As of the 2000 census, the state as a whole had a population of 608,827. As there are a total of 150 representatives, there were 4,059 residents per representative (or 8,118 residents per two representatives). The one member Chittenden-3-9 District had a population of 3,714 in that same census, 8.5% below the state average.

== District representative ==
- Bert Munger, Democrat

== See also ==
- Members of the Vermont House of Representatives, 2005-2006 session
- Vermont Representative Districts, 2002-2012
