= Gabriel Villa =

Gabriel Villa (born in El Paso, Texas), is a Chicago-based artist and muralist. Villa arrived in Chicago in the late 1990s. Observations of his neighborhood had a profound visual and conceptual impact on the evolution of his work. Subjects such as public housing, surveillance, the marginalized, gang culture, family, religion and most recently gentrification/displacement all begin to morph and weave into broader ideas.

== 2009 mural censorship controversy ==
In May 2009, he was commissioned to paint a mural on private property in Chicago's Bridgeport neighborhood depicting three Chicago Police Department public surveillance cameras that carried the CPD logo along with other images, like a crucified Christ, a deer head and a skull. The mural was painted over completely by the Graffiti Blasters at the behest of 11th ward Alderman James Balcer, who said about the mural, "My main concern is the safety and well-being for the people in this community. We have gang violence and children getting shot, and I believed that the mural sent the wrong message." The incident sparked a local controversy over censorship, surveillance and private property.

== See also ==
- Operation Virtual Shield
