= List of articles and sections of the Vermont Constitution =

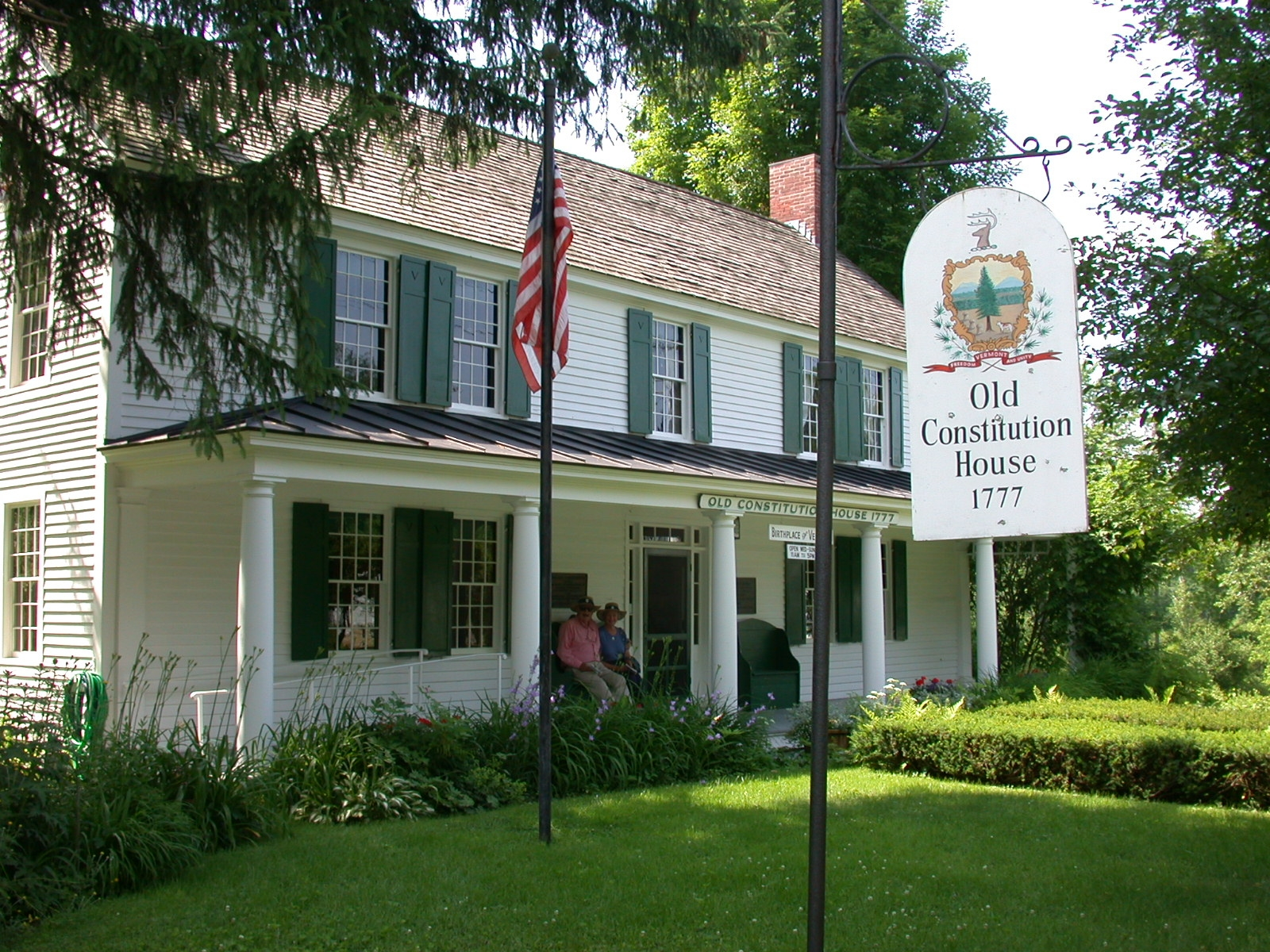
The Old Constitution House in Windsor, Vermont, where the constitution of the Vermont Republic was signed.

This list of articles and sections of the Vermont Constitution enumerates the contents of the Constitution of Vermont, which is organized into two parts, one declaring the rights of inhabitants and the other defining the governing power. The rights of the inhabitants are in 21 articles, addressing among other things the prohibition of slavery, compensation for use of property, freedom of worship, "free and pure" elections, search and seizure, freedom of speech and press, trial by jury, the right to bear arms and the right to assemble. The governing powers are in 76 sections, addressing among other things the composition of the legislative, executive and judicial bodies and their powers, the conduct of elections, and general administrative powers of government.

== Rights of inhabitants ==
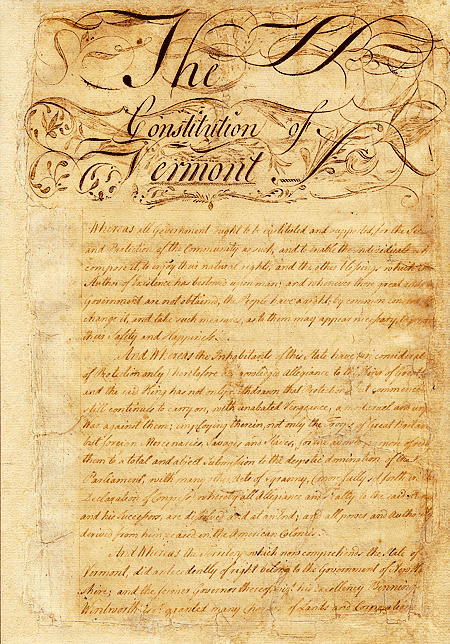
Vellum manuscript of the Constitution of Vermont, 1777. This constitution was amended in 1786, and replaced in 1793 following Vermont's admission to the federal union in 1791.

- Article 1 – All persons born free; their natural rights; slavery prohibited
- Article 2 – Private property subject to public use; owner to be paid
- Article 3 – Freedom in religion; right and duty of religious worship
- Article 4 – Remedy at law secured to all
- Article 5 – Internal police
- Article 6 – Officers servants of the people
- Article 7 – Government for the people; they may change it
- Article 8 – Elections to be free and pure; rights of voters therein
- Article 9 – Citizens' rights and duties in the state; bearing arms; taxation
- Article 10 – Rights of persons accused of crime; personal liberty; waiver of jury trial
- Article 11 – Search and seizure regulated
- Article 12 – Trial by jury to be held sacred
- Article 13 – Freedom of speech and of the press
- Article 14 – Immunity for words spoken in legislative debate
- Article 15 – Legislature only may suspend laws
- Article 16 – Right to bear arms; standing armies; military power subordinate to civil
- Article 17 – Martial law restricted
- Article 18 – Regard to fundamental principles and virtues necessary to preserve liberty
- Article 19 – Right to emigrate
- Article 20 – Right to assemble, instruct and petition
- Article 21 – No transportation for trial
- Article 22 – Personal reproductive liberty

== Governing power ==
- Section 1 – Governing Power
- Section 2 – Supreme legislative power
- Section 3 – Supreme executive power
- Section 4 – Judiciary
- Section 5 – Departments to be distinct
- Section 6 – Legislative powers
- Section 7 – Biennial sessions
- Section 8 – Doors of general assembly to be open
- Section 9 – Journals; yeas and nays
- Section 10 – Style of laws
- Section 11 – Governor to approve bills; veto proceedings thereon; nonaction
- Section 12 – Fees for advocating bills, etc.
- Section 13 – Representatives; number
- Section 14 – Powers of house
- Section 15 – Residence of representatives and senators
- Section 16 – Representatives' oaths
- Section 17 – Oath of senators and representatives
- Section 18 – Senators; numbers; qualifications
- Section 19 – Powers of senate; Lieutenant-Governor's duties
- Section 20 – Governor; executive power
- Section 21 – Secretary of civil and military affairs
- Section 22 – Commissions; state seal
- Section 23 – Residence of Governor and Lieutenant-Governor
- Section 24 – Vacancy in office of Governor, Lieutenant Governor and Treasurer
- Section 25 – Security given by Treasurer and sheriffs
- Section 26 – Treasurer's accounts
- Section 27 – Drawing money from treasury
- Section 28 – Courts of justice
- Section 29 – The Supreme Court; composition
- Section 30 – Supreme Court; jurisdiction
- Section 31 – Lower courts; jurisdiction
- Section 32 – Filling judicial vacancies
- Section 33 – Interim judicial appointments
- Section 34 – Judicial term of office
- Section 35 – Mandatory retirement
- Section 36 – Suspension and removal; implementation procedures for sections 32 through 36
- Section 37 – Rule-making power
- Section 38 – Jury trials
- Section 39 – Forms of prosecutions and indictments; fines
- Section 40 – Excessive bail prohibited; prisoners bailable; imprisonment for debt prohibited
- Section 41 – Habeas corpus
- Section 42 – Voter's qualifications and oaths
- Section 43 – Biennial elections
- Section 44 – Election of representatives and senators
- Section 45 – Manner of election
- Section 46 – Terms of senators and representatives
- Section 47 – Election of Governor, Lieutenant-Governor and Treasurer
- Section 48 – Election of secretary of state and auditor of accounts
- Section 49 – Term of Governor, Lieutenant Governor and Treasurer
- Section 50 – Election of assistant judges, sheriffs and state's attorneys
- Section 51 – Election of judges of probate
- Section 52 – Election of justices of the peace; apportionment
- Section 53 – Election of assistant judges, sheriffs, state's attorneys, judges of probate, and justices of the peace
- Section 54 – Incompatible offices
- Section 55 – Freedom of elections; bribery
- Section 56 – Oaths of allegiance and office
- Section 57 – Impeachments, house may order
- Section 58 – Liability to; senate to try; judgment
- Section 59 – Militia
- Section 60 – Legislature restricted
- Section 61 – Offices of profit; compensation; illegal fees
- Section 62 – Record of deeds
- Section 63 – Entails to be regulated
- Section 64 – Punishment at hard labor
- Section 65 – Suicide's estate not forfeited; no deodand
- Section 66 – Citizenship
- Section 67 – Hunting; fowling and fishing
- Section 68 – Laws to encourage virtue and prevent vice; schools; religious activities
- Section 69 – Charters, limit on right to grant
- Section 70 – Workers' compensation
- Section 71 – Declaration of rights not to be violated
- Section 72 – Amending constitution
- Section 73 – Manner of apportionment of the general assembly
- Section 74 – Extension of terms of certain officers
- Section 75 – Revision of chapter II
- Section 76 – Inclusive language revision

== See also ==
- Vermont
- Government of Vermont
- Politics of Vermont
