= Chittenden-3-1 Vermont Representative District, 2002–2012 =

State Representative district in Vermont, U.S.

Coordinates: 44°30′50″N 73°15′20″W

The Chittenden-3-1 Representative District is a two-member state Representative district in the U.S. state of Vermont. It is one of the 108 one or two member districts into which the state was divided by the redistricting and reapportionment plan developed by the Vermont General Assembly following the 2000 U.S. census. The plan applies to legislatures elected in 2002, 2004, 2006, 2008, and 2010. A new plan will be developed in 2012 following the 2010 U.S. census.

The Chittenden-3-1 District includes a section of the Chittenden County city of Burlington defined as follows:

Consisting of all that portion of the City of Burlington encompassed within a boundary beginning where the northerly property line of Leddy Park intersects the shore of Lake Champlain, then northeasterly along said property line and said property line extended to North Avenue, then southeasterly along North Avenue to the southerly boundary of Farrington's Trailer Park, then northeasterly and northwesterly along the boundary of Farrington's Trailer Park and the back property lines of property fronting Lopes Avenue to the northwest corner of the corner lot at the intersection of Lopes Avenue and Roseade Parkway including all the residences in Farrington's Trailer Park and on Poirier Place, then northeasterly along the back property lines between property fronting on Roseade Parkway and Arlington Court including all the residences on Arlington Court, and turning northwesterly along the back property lines of property fronting Arlington Court to the intersection of the back property lines of property fronting Farrington Parkway, then easterly along the back property lines of property fronting Farrington Parkway to the south, then easterly along Farrington Parkway to the intersection of Farrington Parkway and Ethan Allen Parkway, then northerly along Ethan Allen Parkway to a point where the back property lines of property fronting the north side of Farrington Parkway intersect Ethan Allen Parkway, then westerly along the back property lines of property fronting the north side of Farrington Parkway to include all residences on Farrington Parkway, continuing west across the end of Gosse Court to the southeast corner of the Lyman C. Hunt School property, then northwesterly along the property boundary of the Lyman C. Hunt School property to its northeast corner, then northeasterly along the back property lines of property fronting on Janet Circle to a point where said back property lines intersect the back property lines of property fronting on James Avenue, then northwesterly along the back property lines of property fronting on James Avenue and Sandra Circle and continuing northeasterly along the back property lines of property fronting on Sandra Circle to the intersection of the right-of-way of the Winooski Valley Park Way, then northerly in a straight line to the Winooski River, then northerly along the Winooski River to its intersection with Lake Champlain, then southerly along the shore of Lake Champlain back to the point of beginning.

— Vermont Statutes, Title 17, Chapter 34, Section 1893a

The rest of Burlington is in Chittenden-3-2, Chittenden-3-3, Chittenden-3-4, Chittenden-3-5 and Chittenden-3-6.

As of the 2000 census, the state as a whole had a population of 608,827. As there are a total of 150 representatives, there were 4,059 residents per representative (or 8,118 residents per two representatives). The two member Chittenden-3-1 District had a population of 7,658 in that same census, 5.67% below the state average.

== District representatives ==
- Carol Ode, Democrat
- Kurt Wright, Republican

== See also ==
- Members of the Vermont House of Representatives, 2005-2006 session
- Vermont Representative Districts, 2002-2012
