= Patrick Daley Thompson =

American politician (born 1969)

Patrick Thompson
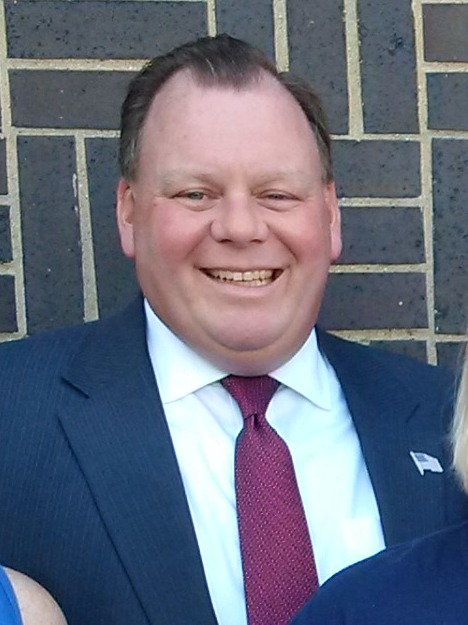
- Thompson in 2016

Member of the Chicago City Council from the 11th ward
- In office May 18, 2015 – February 14, 2022
- Preceded by: James Balcer
- Succeeded by: Nicole Lee

Member of the Metropolitan Water Reclamation District of Greater Chicago Board of Commissioners
- In office December 2012 – May 15, 2015
- Preceded by: Patricia Horton/ Terrence J. O'Brien
- Succeeded by: David J. Walsh

Personal details
- Born: Patrick Daley Thompson; July 8, 1969 (age 57)
- Party: Democratic
- Education: Saint Mary's University, Minnesota (BA); John Marshall Law School, Chicago (JD)

Patrick Daley Thompson (born July 8, 1969) is an American former politician who most recently served as an alderman from Chicago's 11th ward and was previously a commissioner of the Metropolitan Water Reclamation District of Greater Chicago. A member of the prominent Daley family, he is a grandson of Richard J. Daley and a nephew of Richard M. Daley, both of whom served as longtime mayors of Chicago.

== Early life ==
The son of Patricia (née Daley), a schoolteacher, and Bill Thompson, a real estate developer, following his parents' divorce, Patrick and his siblings moved to Bridgeport with their mother to be closer to her family.

== Water Reclamation District Board of Commissioners ==
In 2012, Daley successfully ran for a position on the Metropolitan Water Reclamation District of Greater Chicago Board of Commissioners. His campaign received sizable fundraising, and endorsements from high-profile politicians, including Michael Madigan, Rahm Emanuel, Edward M. Burke, Toni Preckwinkle, and John P. Daley, as well as the endorsement of the Cook County Democratic Party.

== Aldermanic career ==
Thompson, who succeeded long-time alderman James Balcer, was elected to office in a runoff election against John Kozlar in April 2015 and sworn in on May 18, 2015. The 11th ward encompasses several neighborhoods on Chicago's South Side, including Bridgeport, where Thompson was raised and currently resides.

Thompson was reelected in 2019. In the runoff of the 2019 Chicago mayoral election, Daley Thompson endorsed Toni Preckwinkle.

== Conviction and overturn ==
On April 29, 2021, Thompson was indicted on federal charges related to the investigation into the collapse of Washington Federal Bank for Savings. He was charged with two counts of making false statements to the FDIC and five counts of filing false income-tax returns. On February 14, 2022, Thompson was convicted on all charges. According to Illinois law, Thompson's federal conviction makes him ineligible to continue serving as the 11th Ward alderman and bans him from running for public office in the future.

On July 6, 2022, Thompson was sentenced to four months in prison for these charges. He began serving his sentence in August 2022 at a medium-security prison in Oxford, Wisconsin. He would serve his sentence. Thompson appealed his case to the US Supreme Court, arguing that his statements were misleading but truthful. In March 2025, the Supreme Court ruled that Thompson's statements specifically needed to be false for prosecution and, in a unanimous ruling, would toss his two convictions. However, the ruling also allowed the option of having the case potentially remanded to the lower courts.

== Electoral history ==
2012 Water Reclamation District Board election Democratic primary
| Party | Candidate | Votes | % |
|---|---|---|---|
| Democratic | Debra Shore (incumbent) | 194,936 | 21.05 |
| Democratic | Kari K. Steele | 182,369 | 19.70 |
| Democratic | Patrick Daley Thompson | 162,329 | 17.53 |
| Democratic | Patricia Young | 129,670 | 14.01 |
| Democratic | Patricia Horton | 128,432 | 13.87 |
| Democratic | Stella B. Black | 125,147 | 13.52 |
| Write-in | Others | 2,968 | 0.32 |
| Total votes | | 925,851 | 100 |

2012 Water Reclamation District Board general election
| Party | Candidate | Votes | % |
|---|---|---|---|
| Democratic | Debra Shore (incumbent) | 1,071,670 | 26.34 |
| Democratic | Kari K. Steele | 919,841 | 22.61 |
| Democratic | Patrick Daley Thompson | 893,178 | 21.96 |
| Republican | Harold "Noonie" Ward | 334,207 | 8.22 |
| Republican | Carl Segvich | 341,603 | 8.40 |
| Green | Dave Ehrlich | 200,953 | 4.94 |
| Green | Karen Roothaan | 189,505 | 4.66 |
| Green | Nasrin R. Khalili | 117,089 | 2.88 |
| Total votes | | 4,068,046 | 100 |

Chicago 11th ward aldermanic general election, 2015
| Party | Candidate | Votes | % |
|---|---|---|---|
| Nonpartisan | Patrick Daley Thompson | 4,644 | 48.37 |
| Nonpartisan | John K. Kozlar | 3,399 | 35.40 |
| Nonpartisan | Maureen F. Sullivan | 1,558 | 16.23 |
| Total votes | | 9,601 | 100 |

Chicago 11th ward aldermanic runoff election, 2015
| Party | Candidate | Votes | % |
|---|---|---|---|
| Nonpartisan | Patrick Daley Thompson | 7,229 | 58.09 |
| Nonpartisan | John K. Kozlar | 5,216 | 41.91 |
| Total votes | | 12,445 | 100 |

Chicago 11th ward aldermanic general election, 2019
| Party | Candidate | Votes | % |
|---|---|---|---|
| Nonpartisan | Patrick Daley Thompson (incumbent) | 7,537 | 73.44 |
| Nonpartisan | David Mihalyfy | 2,726 | 26.56 |
| Total votes | | 10,263 | 100 |
