= Emily Long =

American politician and member of the Vermont State House of Representatives

Majority Leader of the Vermont House of Representatives
- In office January 6, 2021 – January 6, 2025
- Preceded by: Jill Krowinski
- Succeeded by: Lori Houghton

Member of the Vermont House of Representatives from the Windham 5th district
- Incumbent
- Assumed office January 2015
- Preceded by: Richard Marek

Personal details
- Born: June 30, 1959 (age 67) Townshend, Vermont, U.S.
- Party: Democratic
- Spouse: John
- Children: 2

Emily J. Long (born June 30, 1959) is an American politician and a member of the Democratic Party who has served in the Vermont House of Representatives since 2015.

Long serves on the House Committee on General, Housing, and Military Affairs, the House Rules Committee, and the Joint Rules Committee.

Long's legislative priorities include access to affordable health care, environmental conservation and sustainable energy, economic development, and education.

Vermont House of Representatives
Preceded by Jill Krowinski	Majority Leader of the Vermont House of Representatives; 2021–2025	Succeeded by Lori Houghton
