= Education in Vermont =

Education in Vermont consists of public and private schools including the University of Vermont, the Vermont State Colleges, private colleges, and secondary and primary schools in the U.S. state of Vermont.

== Vermont State Board of Education ==
The Vermont State Board of Education or VSBE, is appointed by the governor with approval by the senate. It administers public education in the state. Local municipalities and their respective school districts operate individual public schools but the VSBE audits performance of public schools. The VSBE also makes recommendations to state leaders concerning education spending and policies.

== Primary and secondary schools ==
Vermont’s compulsory attendance statute requires parents or guardians to cause their children between the ages of 6 and 16 to attend a public school, an independent school (private schools), approved education program or a home study program (homeschooling). Public and independent schools are commonly but not exclusively divided into three tiers of primary and secondary education: elementary school, middle school or junior high school and high school. School districts are often complex in structure. In some cases, elementary, middle and junior high schools of a single district feed into high schools in another district or overlap with other districts at the high school level.

There are 250 public schools in Vermont. This includes 28 union high schools. Union high schools are those supported by towns with separate school districts for elementary grades.

To promote educational efficiency the state allowed towns to create a higher level school district above the level of each participating town, the union. The main function of the union school was to permit the creation of larger high schools in rural areas. Participating towns elect two school boards, one local, the second at the union level. The local union hires the principal and teachers; the union level hires a superintendent who is expected to supervise all local schools. There are more than 80 such unions in the state, out of 362 total school districts, many of whom fall under the union school districts.

A majority of graduating seniors select out-of-state colleges. This reached a high of 59.4% in 2004 and has ebbed since then.

The high school population is expected to decline 20% from 2009 to 2022, one of the largest drops in the nation. This is attributed to Vermont's low birthrate.

In 2018, the school system had been built to educate 100,000 students, but was educating 76,000; 24,000 fewer since 1998. The student to staff ratio decreased from 7:1 to about 4:1. The state spent $1.6 billion to educate these 76,000 students, the largest per capita in the country and twice the national average. About half of high school graduates continued on to earn an undergraduate degree.

School districts include the Dresden School District, the first-in-the-nation cross-state school district, which includes Hanover, New Hampshire. Hanover was once part of the state of Vermont (see below).

The state authorized two more pre-K grades to the school system for the benefit of three- and four-year-olds. Entry to these two grades is capped.

In 2008, there were 19,145 full-time equivalent teachers and 94,114 students in public schools. Teacher-pupil ratio is 11.12:1. The number of pupils has dropped annually from 2003-2009.

Private schools are less common than public schools. Some private high schools can be perceived as "semi-private". This means that while it costs money to send children there, towns will make a contract with a school to take children from a town at a slightly reduced rate. Often this is done when it is deemed cheaper to subsidize private tuition than build a whole new school when a private one already exists.

Around 90 Vermont towns have no public schools at all, or only have a public elementary school or a public high school. The students of these towns have access to school choice for the grades the town does not provide. In these instances, towns are required to pay tuition to other public schools or approved independent schools for resident students of the town to attend.

In 2010, an estimated 2/3 to 3/4 of all schools opened during the last week of August (before Labor Day).

In 2016 there were more than 280 school districts. By 2018 the Vermont government passed a school consolidation law hoping to reduce the number of districts; in 2016 79 or more districts each had enrollments under 100.

=== Enrollment ===
In 2000 there were about 100,000 students in Vermont public schools. In 2016 there were a total of about 80,000 students in Vermont public schools.

=== Rankings ===
Vermont was named the nation's smartest state in 2005 and 2006. In 2006, there was a gap between state testing standards and national which is biased in favor of the state standards by 30%, on average. This puts Vermont 11th best in the nation. Most states have a higher bias. However, when allowance for race is considered, a 2007 US Government list of test scores shows Vermont white fourth graders performed 25th in the nation for reading (229), 26th for math (247). White eight graders scored 18th for math (292) and 12th for reading (273). The first three scores were not considered statistically significant from average. White eighth graders scored significantly above average in reading. Statistics for black students were not comparable because of their small representation in the testing.

Education Week ranked the state second in the nation in high school graduation rates for 2007.

In 2008, Vermont high school students achieved the highest five-year increase in the country in Advanced Placement testing. 19.8% of tested students scored a 3 or higher, compared to an average of 15.2% in the rest of the country.

In 2010 the state ranked highest in the nation for achievement of low-income students. In the same evaluation, it ranked the lowest in the country for education reform. States were evaluated for education reform on academic standards, change in proficiency standards, private school choice, charter school law, online learning policies and programs, home-schooling regulations and removing ineffective teachers.

=== Standards ===
The state participated in a 30-state Common Core State Standards Initiative and assessment of students to replace the New England NECAP test. The state intended to use the new standards by 2015. The test will be given in grades 3-8 and at the end of grade 11 (junior year).

=== Health ===
In 2010, the National Association of School Nurses reported that the state had the highest ratio of school nurses to students, in the country, 1:311.

=== School boards ===
In 2010 there were 62 supervisory unions containing fewer than 95,000 students.

School boards require voter approval before implementing a budget.

=== History ===
==== Academies and grammar schools ====
Vermont's 1777 constitution was the first in English-speaking North America to mandate public funding for universal education. This requirement was first met by elementary-level village schools with sessions held in the cooler months to accommodate farm work. Most schools educated similar numbers of girls and boys. Conditions in these schools varied, and the highest level of instruction was tenth grade. By the end of the eighteenth century, grammar schools, instructing students in English, algebra, geometry, Greek, and Latin, had been established at Bennington, Burlington, Castleton, Middlebury, Montpelier, and Windsor. These grammar schools were of a higher caliber than the smaller villages' schools, and the level of education at some was equivalent to college level.

By the mid-nineteenth century, an expansion in settlement and the population of the state, coupled with increased prosperity, brought grammar schools to all corners of Vermont. Even the most remote Northeast Kingdom had established high-school-level instruction in Brownington, Craftsbury, Danville, Hardwick, and Newport. Many of these established grammar schools and academies, though not entirely public, received funds from area town governments in exchange for education of their students. As a system of public funding for primary and secondary education took root, many of these schools became municipal public schools. Several remained private, becoming private high-school-level academies, and several become colleges; the Orange County Grammar School became Vermont Technical College, the Rutland County Grammar School became Castleton State College, the Lamoille County Grammar School became Johnson State College, and the Addison County Grammar School became Middlebury College.

In 1845, a state statute required county judges to appoint a county superintendent of schools to oversee common schools.

In 1892, the state created the town school district system.

==== Educating teachers ====
In the 1860s a shortage of qualified teachers brought the establishment of state "normal schools," a term based on the French term école normale – a school to train teachers. The grammar schools at Randolph Center (1866), Castleton, and Johnson became normal schools, additional normal schools were established in Concord and Lyndonville. Additional post secondary schools instructing students to become teachers were called seminaries. While several were nominally associated with Protestant churches, none were seminaries in the sense of training ministers. These seminaries also graduated teachers to staff Vermont's growing number of primary and secondary schools.

==== The one-room school house ====
The one-room school house, born of small multi-age rural populations, continued well into the twentieth century. Rural towns without a single central village often built two to a half-dozen school houses across their terrain. Much of this came from a lack of transportation and a need for students to return home by mid afternoon for farm chores. By 1920 all public schools, including the one-room school houses, were regulated by the state government. In the early 1930s state legislation established a review and certification program similar to accreditation. Schools were issued regulations about teacher education and curriculum. Education quality in rural areas was maintained through a program called Vermont Standard Schools. Rural school houses meeting certification requirements displayed a green and white plaque with the Vermont coat of arms and the words "Vermont Standard School."

==== Consolidation ====
The state passed Act 46 to compel small school districts to merge into larger ones, with the consolidated districts to operate effective July 1, 2019. Judge Robert A. Mello of the Franklin County Superior Court upheld the implementation of the law in 2019.

=== Secondary schools ===
In 2009, 26% of seniors took that ACT test; 70% took the SAT test. The average SAT score was 519 in critical reading, 521 in math, and 506 in writing. The average total was 1,546. The US average was 1,509.

2,677 students took AP classes; many took more than one; 6,057 AP tests were given.

=== Teachers ===
In 2013, the ratio of students to teachers is the lowest in the country.

In 2010, the law changed to require teachers to work until 65 after 30 years of teaching. The former age was 62. Or years spent in the classroom plus the teachers age must now equal 90. A waiver was made for teachers who were "close" under the previous system.

=== Funding ===
The legislature passed Act 60 in 1997 in an attempt to balance taxation for education among towns. It has been controversial.

In 2017, spending $1.6 billion on education for 76,000 public school children, represents more than $21,000 per student.

In 2010, educators accounted for 70% of a school's cost.

According to one study, enrollment in kindergarten through 12th grade has declined by nearly 10 percent during the 1990s. During the same period total staff numbers have increased by more than 20 percent. Per pupil spending grew from $6,073 in 1990 to $13,664 in 2006.

In 2007, state costs for special education was $264 million, more than double what it was in 1998. In 2008, 14% of public school students qualified for special help.

In 2010 Vermont ranked 49th out of 50 states in the nation for the amount spent subsidizing higher education, per capita.

=== Sports ===
As in most areas, high schools compete in sports in two types of division. One, because of logistical and geographical constraints, is necessarily local. That is, large schools play small ones in the same area. A second division is based on school population and is statewide. Eventually, schools with the best records in this type of division will meet each other for seasonal playoffs. Football division assignments are based on a combination of football wins over the last four years, the number of boys playing the sport and the total boy enrollment in the school.

There are three major geographical groups: Northern Vermont Athletic Conference (NVAC), Marble Valley (MVL, and Connecticut Valley (CVL). These in turn are broken into geographical divisions CVC Central, NVAC Lake (near Lake Champlain), Mountain, NVAC East, NVAC Metro (Burlington area), NVAC Capital, CVL, and MVL Divisions A, B, and C. Divisions based on population are I, II, III and IV, with the largest schools in I.

== Colleges and universities ==
In 2008, Vermont has the highest average in-state annual tuition and fees for 4-year colleges at $11,341, up 8.1% since 2007. The state also has the highest 2-year average tuition and fees at $5,830, up 6% since 2007. Community College of Vermont, is the most expensive community college in the country.

The average Vermont graduate in the class of 2007 owed $24,329, making the state the fourth worst in the country.

=== History ===
During the period of the Vermont Republic several towns on the east side of the Connecticut River were part of Vermont. This included Hanover, home of Dartmouth College. Statehood brought about establishment of the Connecticut River as a natural border. Having lost Dartmouth College, Ira Allen established the University of Vermont (UVM) in 1791 to complement the smaller college at Castleton. By the mid-twentieth century all but one of the state normal schools, and many of the seminaries, had become four-year colleges of liberal arts and sciences. Experimentation at the University of Vermont by George Perkins Marsh, and later the influence of Vermont born philosopher and educator John Dewey brought about the concepts of electives and learning by doing. Today Vermont has five colleges within the Vermont State Colleges system, UVM, fourteen other private, degree-granting colleges, including Middlebury College, a private, co-educational liberal arts college founded in 1800, Champlain College, located in Burlington, is the primary private college of Vermont's largest city, the Vermont Law School at Royalton, and Norwich University, the oldest private military college in the United States and birthplace of ROTC, founded in 1819. Burlington College was a private college in the City of Burlington, but closed its doors and its assets were sold in 2016, due to financial difficulties.

=== Major universities ===
The University of Vermont is located in Burlington.

The state contribution to UVM in 2008 was $42.2 million. Other state college funding was $25.2 million.

=== Other post-secondary schools ===
Besides the "National Universities", Vermont has several other universities, both public and private. There are about a dozen small liberal arts colleges across the state. Additionally, Vermont supports public community colleges in the Community College of Vermont.

== Concerns ==
A non-profit organization dedicated to education reform, gave Vermont the lowest ranking in the nation for college readiness programs for high school. It said that the state was doing nothing in four areas: 1) aligning high school standards and graduation requirements with college and workplace expectations, 2) administering a college readiness test to all high school students; 3) developing a data system to track students from kindergarten on; and 4) holding high schools accountable for graduating students who are college and workplace ready.

The state stood 42nd in 2006 for high school graduates continuing on to college, 54.5%. It was 50th in the estimated percentage of high school students going to college in their home state, 23.6%. It has the highest cost in the nation for public two-year and four-year colleges. It is second-highest in the nation for adults 25-64 with a high school degree and no college. It is 44th for two-year college completion, but 7th for 4-year college completion.

In 2006, Vermont ranked eighth in the country for high school graduation rate, 82.3%.

In 2026, Vermont residents with student debt had the highest median monthly student loan repayment bills of all the 50 states within the United States.
