= Trang Do =

American politician

Member-elect of the Vermont House of Representatives from the Chittenden-16 district
- Assuming office January 2027
- Succeeding: Jill Krowinski

Personal details
- Party: Democratic
- Education: University of Vermont

Trang Do is an American politician. A member of the Democratic Party, she is the member-elect for the Chittenden-16 district of the Vermont House of Representatives. She is of Vietnamese descent.
