= Chittenden-3-3 Vermont Representative District, 2002–2012 =

State Representative district in Vermont, U.S.

Coordinates: 44°28′40″N 73°12′40″W

The Chittenden-3-3 Representative District is a two-member state Representative district in the U.S. state of Vermont. It is one of the 108 one or two member districts into which the state was divided by the redistricting and reapportionment plan developed by the Vermont General Assembly following the 2000 U.S. census. The plan applies to legislatures elected in 2002, 2004, 2006, 2008, and 2010. A new plan will be developed in 2012 following the 2010 U.S. census.

The Chittenden-3-3 District includes a section of the Chittenden County city of Burlington defined as follows:

Consisting of that portion of the City of Burlington encompassed within a boundary beginning at the intersection of Maple and Willard Streets, then westerly along Maple Street to the intersection of St. Paul Street, then southerly along St. Paul Street to the intersection of Kilburn Street, then westerly along Kilburn Street to the intersection of Pine Street, then southerly along Pine Street to where the railroad track parallels Pine Street, then northwesterly along the railroad track to the intersection of Maple Street, then westerly along Maple Street to the shore of Lake Champlain, then northerly along the shore of Lake Champlain to the intersection of the northern boundary line of the property to the north of the Moran Plant, then easterly along the boundary line to the intersection of the railroad tracks, then northerly along the railroad tracks to an intersection with a straight-line extension of Sunset Court, then northeasterly along the straight-line extension of Sunset Court and continuing along Sunset Court to its intersection with North Avenue to include all residences on the southeasterly side of Sunset Court, then southeasterly along North Avenue to the intersection of Strong Street, then easterly along Strong Street to the intersection of Pitkin Street, then northerly along Pitkin Street to the intersection of Manhattan Drive, then easterly along Manhattan Drive to the intersection of Spring Street, then southeasterly along Spring Street to the intersection of Archibald Street, then easterly along Archibald Street to the intersection of North Union Street, then southwesterly and southerly along North Union Street to the intersection of Pearl Street, then easterly along Pearl Street to the intersection of Willard Street, then southerly along Willard Street to the point of beginning.

— Vermont Statutes, Title 17, Chapter 34, Section 1893a

The rest of Burlington is in Chittenden-3-1, Chittenden-3-2, Chittenden-3-4, Chittenden-3-5 and Chittenden-3-6.

As of the 2000 census, the state as a whole had a population of 608,827. As there are a total of 150 representatives, there were 4,059 residents per representative (or 8,118 residents per two representatives). The two member Chittenden-3-3 District had a population of 8,865 in that same census, 9.2% above the state average.

== District representatives ==
- Jason P. Lorber, Democrat
- Rachel Weston, Democrat

== See also ==
- Members of the Vermont House of Representatives, 2005-2006 session
- Vermont Representative Districts, 2002-2012
