= Lori Houghton =

American politician and member of the Vermont State House of Representatives

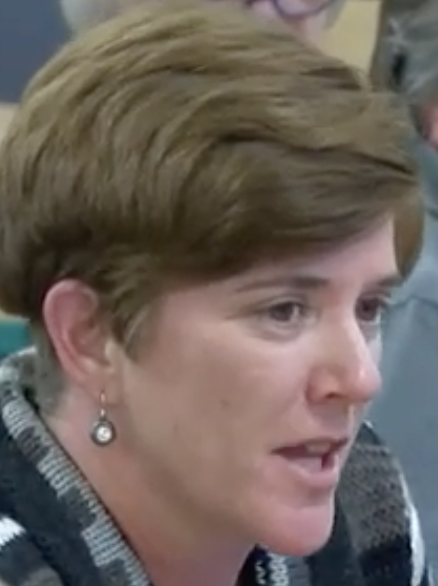

Majority Leader of the Vermont House of Representatives
- Incumbent
- Assumed office January 6, 2025
- Preceded by: Emily Long

Member of the Vermont House of Representatives from the Chittenden 8-2 district
- Incumbent
- Assumed office January 2017

Personal details
- Born: August 4, 1969 (age 57) Washington, D.C., U.S.
- Party: Democratic
- Children: 1
- Education: Ohio University (attended); University of Pittsburgh (BA); George Washington University (MA)

Lori Houghton (born August 4, 1969) is an American politician who has served in the Vermont House of Representatives since 2017.

Vermont House of Representatives
Preceded by Emily Long	Majority Leader of the Vermont House of Representatives; 2025–present	Incumbent
