= Nicole Lee (politician) =

American politician (born 1974/75)

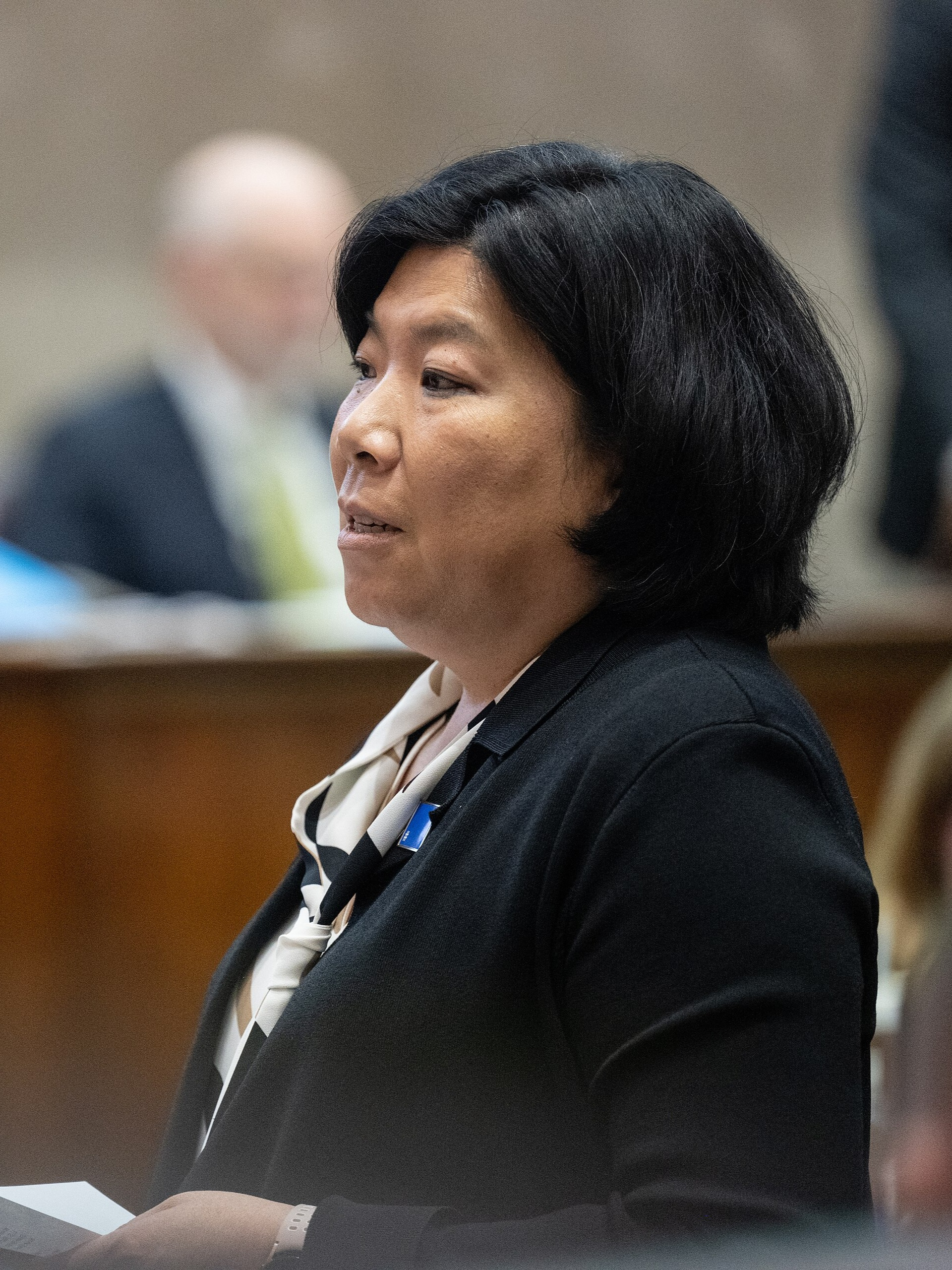

Member of the Chicago City Council from the 11th ward
- Incumbent
- Assumed office March 28, 2022
- Preceded by: Patrick Daley Thompson

Personal details
- Born: 1974 or 1975 (age 51–52) Chicago, Illinois, U.S.
- Party: Democratic
- Education: Indiana University Bloomington (BS); University of Chicago (MPP)

Nicole T. Lee (born 1974 or 1975) is an American politician in Chicago, Illinois. She is a member of the Chicago City Council as the alderwoman for the 11th ward, which includes portions of Bridgeport, New City, and Chinatown. She took office in March 2022, after being appointed to fill the vacancy created by the removal of Patrick Daley Thompson. She was elected to a full term in 2023. She is the second Asian American and first Chinese American to serve on the City Council. (Note: The first Asian American member of the Chicago City Council was Ameya Pawar.)

== Early life and education ==
Lee was born and raised in the Chinatown neighborhood of Chicago. She attended Mark Sheridan Math and Science Academy and Whitney Young Magnet High School. She received a bachelor's degree in public affairs from Indiana University Bloomington and a master's degree in public policy from University of Chicago.

== Career ==
Prior to her appointment to City Council, Lee was an executive at United Airlines and worked on philanthropy and corporate social responsibility efforts. She had previously worked in several executive roles for Private Bank, BP America, and other corporations. She has also served as an independent consultant for community organizations, president of the Chicago chapter of the Organization of Chinese Americans, interim executive director and board member of the Chinese Mutual Aid Association, and a member of the University of Illinois at Chicago Asian American Advisory Council. From 2017 to 2021, she served on the local school council for Haines Elementary School.

== Chicago City Council ==
=== Appointment ===
On February 14, 2022, incumbent 11th ward alderman Patrick Daley Thompson was removed from his position after his conviction for federal tax fraud charges made him ineligible to serve. The office of Mayor Lori Lightfoot, charged with nominating a replacement, announced on March 15 that it had received 27 applications. Lightfoot nominated Lee on March 24, citing her "dedication to empowering communities and building coalitions." On March 28, the City Council approved her appointment in a 45-0 vote. Lee stated that her top three priorities for the ward were city services provision, public safety, and educational opportunities.

== Personal life and family ==
Lee's father, Gene Lee, was a long-time political aide for former Chicago Mayor Richard M. Daley. He pled guilty to charges of embezzlement and fraud, unrelated to his position as an aide, in 2014.

== Electoral history ==
2023 Chicago aldermanic election, 11th ward, runoff election
Party	Candidate	Votes	%
Nonpartisan	Nicole Lee	8,045	62.64%
Nonpartisan	Anthony "Tony" Ciaravino	4,799	37.36%
Total votes		12,844	100%

2023 Chicago aldermanic election, 11th ward, first round
Party	Candidate	Votes	%
Nonpartisan	Nicole Lee (incumbent)	3,561	30.9
Nonpartisan	Tony Ciaravino	3,384	29.4
Nonpartisan	Don Don	2,254	19.6
Nonpartisan	Ambria Taylor	1,552	13.5
Nonpartisan	Vida Jimenez	326	2.8
Nonpartisan	Froy Jimenez	275	2.4
Nonpartisan	Steve Demitro	159	1.4
Total votes		11,511	100.0

== See also ==
- List of Chicago alderpersons since 1923
