= Chittenden-3-4 Vermont Representative District, 2002–2012 =

State representative district in Vermont

Coordinates: 44°28′45″N 73°11′45″W

The Chittenden-3-4 Representative District is a two-member state Representative district in the U.S. state of Vermont. It is one of the 108 one or two member districts into which the state was divided by the redistricting and reapportionment plan developed by the Vermont General Assembly following the 2000 U.S. census. The plan applies to legislatures elected in 2002, 2004, 2006, 2008, and 2010. A new plan was developed & passed in 2012 following the 2010 Census.

The rest of Burlington is represented by the Chittenden-3-1, Chittenden-3-2, Chittenden-3-3, Chittenden-3-5 and Chittenden-3-6 districts.

At the time of the 2000 census, the state as a whole had a population of 608,827. As there were a total of 150 Representatives, there were 4,059 residents per representative (or 8,118 residents per two representatives). The two member Chittenden-3-4 District had a population of 8,792 in that same census, 8.3% above the state average.

== District representatives ==
- Kesha Ram, Democrat
- Chris Pearson, Progressive

David Zuckerman, later the lieutenant governor of Vermont, represented the district in the State House from 1997 to 2011.

== See also ==
- Members of the Vermont House of Representatives, 2005–06 session
- Members of the Vermont House of Representatives, 2007–08 session
- Vermont House of Representatives districts, 2002–2012
