= Operation Virtual Shield =

Video surveillance program

Operation Virtual Shield is a program implemented by Chicago, IL mayor Richard M. Daley, which created the most extensive video surveillance network in the United States by linking more than 3000 surveillance cameras to a centralized monitoring system, which captures and processes camera feeds in real time. It also includes sensors such as biological, chemical, and radiological sensors. It is able to detect suspicious or dangerous activity and identify its location, and now incorporates facial recognition. Virtual Shield is also used to record activity at a potential crime scene before police arrive at a call. The cost of the program was $217 million, much of which came from Homeland Security grants. The retention time of technical data collected is 30 days.

Daley stated that Chicago will have a surveillance camera on every street corner by the year 2016.

== See also ==
- Closed-circuit television
- Human Identification At a Distance
- MATRIX
- Total Information Awareness
- Gabriel Villa
