= James Balcer =

American politician

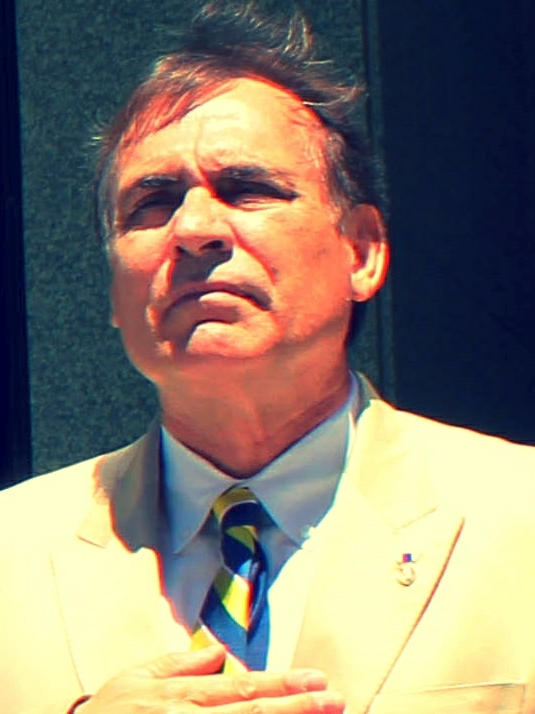
- Balcer in 2014

Member of the Chicago City Council from the 11th ward
- In office 1997 – May 18, 2015
- Preceded by: Patrick Huels
- Succeeded by: Patrick Daley Thompson
- Constituency: 11th ward

Personal details
- Born: July 24, 1950 (age 75)
- Party: Democratic

James A. Balcer (born June 24, 1950) is a former alderman of the 11th Ward of the City of Chicago (map). A member of the Democratic Party, he was appointed to the Chicago City Council by Mayor Richard M. Daley in 1997. In May 2015, he was succeeded by former Metropolitan Water Reclamation District Commissioner, Patrick Daley Thompson.

== Military career ==
Balcer served as a member of the U.S. Marine Corps during the Vietnam War and in 2001 was belatedly awarded the Bronze Star.

== Political career ==
Balcer served as an alderman on six committees: Budget and Government Operations; Energy, Environmental Protection and Public Utilities; Finance; Human Relations; Police and Fire; and Transportation and Public Way.

He was appointed to the Council in the aftermath of a scandal about disclosures about then-Ald. Patrick Huels' private security firm that resulted in Huels' resignation.

Ald. Balcer's former ward encompasses part of Chicago's Southwest Side, and includes the neighborhood of Bridgeport, which has been home to five Chicago mayors, including both Richard M. and Richard J. Daley.

Ald. Balcer attracted media attention in May, 2009 for ordering the removal of a mural that had been commissioned on private property. Ald. Balcer also received a 2010 "Jefferson Muzzle" from the Thomas Jefferson Center for the Protection of Free Expression.
