= Vermont Agency of Commerce and Community Development =

The Vermont Agency of Commerce and Community Development is a Vermont government agency. The agency is charged with the enhancement of the Vermont business climate, the development of tourism, and the strengthening of Vermont communities.

Patricia Moulton is the secretary of the agency.

== Departments ==
The Agency of Commerce and Community Development has the following departments and divisions:

- The Department of Economic Development stimulates business development and job creation. The department assists through support in financing, licensing, business recruitment, and marketing services.
- The Department of Tourism and Marketing promotes Vermont as a travel destination through the mediums of print, television, radio and the World Wide Web. It publishes Vermont's state magazine, Vermont Life.
- The Department of Housing and Community Development offers programs to stimulate and guide sustainable development in Vermont's cities and towns. The department is a central directorate for local and regional land use planning. The department is charged with the preservation of Vermont's historic heritage through community and architectural preservation programs, management of state historic sites, and archeological resources.
- Chief Marketing Officer
- Administration
