= Graffiti Blasters =

Anti-graffiti program in Chicago, Illinois

Graffiti Blasters is a program to eliminate graffiti, street art and gang-related vandalism in Chicago, Illinois. The program is structured as a privately owned business based in the city government. It uses soluble abrasives (baking soda combined with high pressure water) and paints matching the city's official color scheme to erase all varieties of graffiti.

== History ==
Mayor Richard M. Daley started the initiative in 1993. Since then it has run at a cost of about $4 million a year, rising to $7.8 million in 2008 and $9 million in 2010 The scheme promises free cleanup within 24 hours of a phone call to 3-1-1. Prior to the program's inception, the city considered itself responsible for removing graffiti if it was on city property, but private property owners had to shoulder the cleanup costs for graffiti on their own property.

In May 2009, on the instructions of Alderman Jim Balcer, Graffiti Blasters painted over a commissioned mural by artist Gabriel Villa on private property without the permission of the artist or property owner. A spokesman with the ACLU of Illinois said Balcer acted illegally, saying "He was elected to be an alderman. He was not elected to be the art critic of the ward."

== Gallery ==
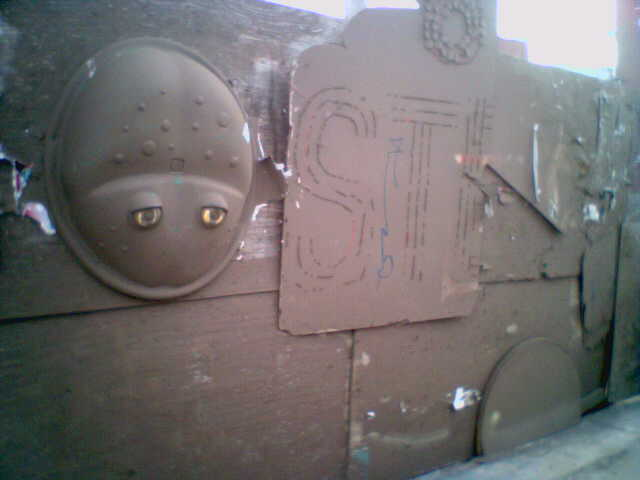
Graffiti covered by the Graffiti Blasters' typical brown paint.

An ironic example of Chicago sticker graffiti condemning the Graffiti Blasters and Mayor Daley

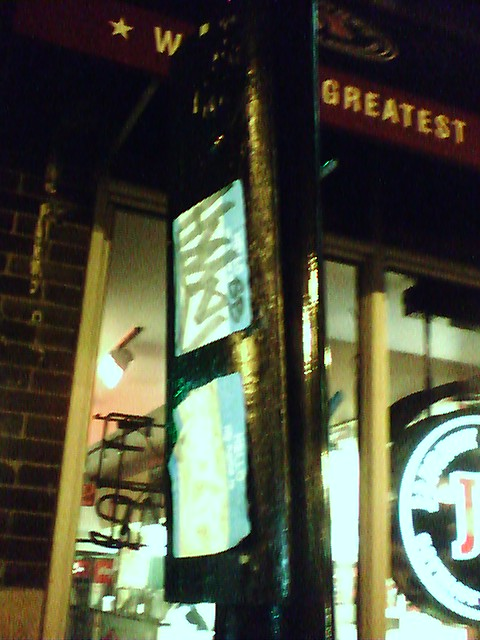
An image of woodblock graffiti that had been painted over by the Chicago Graffiti Blasters and then covered with sticker art.

== See also ==
- Vandal
- Fixing Broken Windows
- Philadelphia Anti-Graffiti Network
- Graffiti abatement
