= 11th ward, Chicago =

Ward in Chicago

11th Ward - Chicago
- Ward
- Ward 11
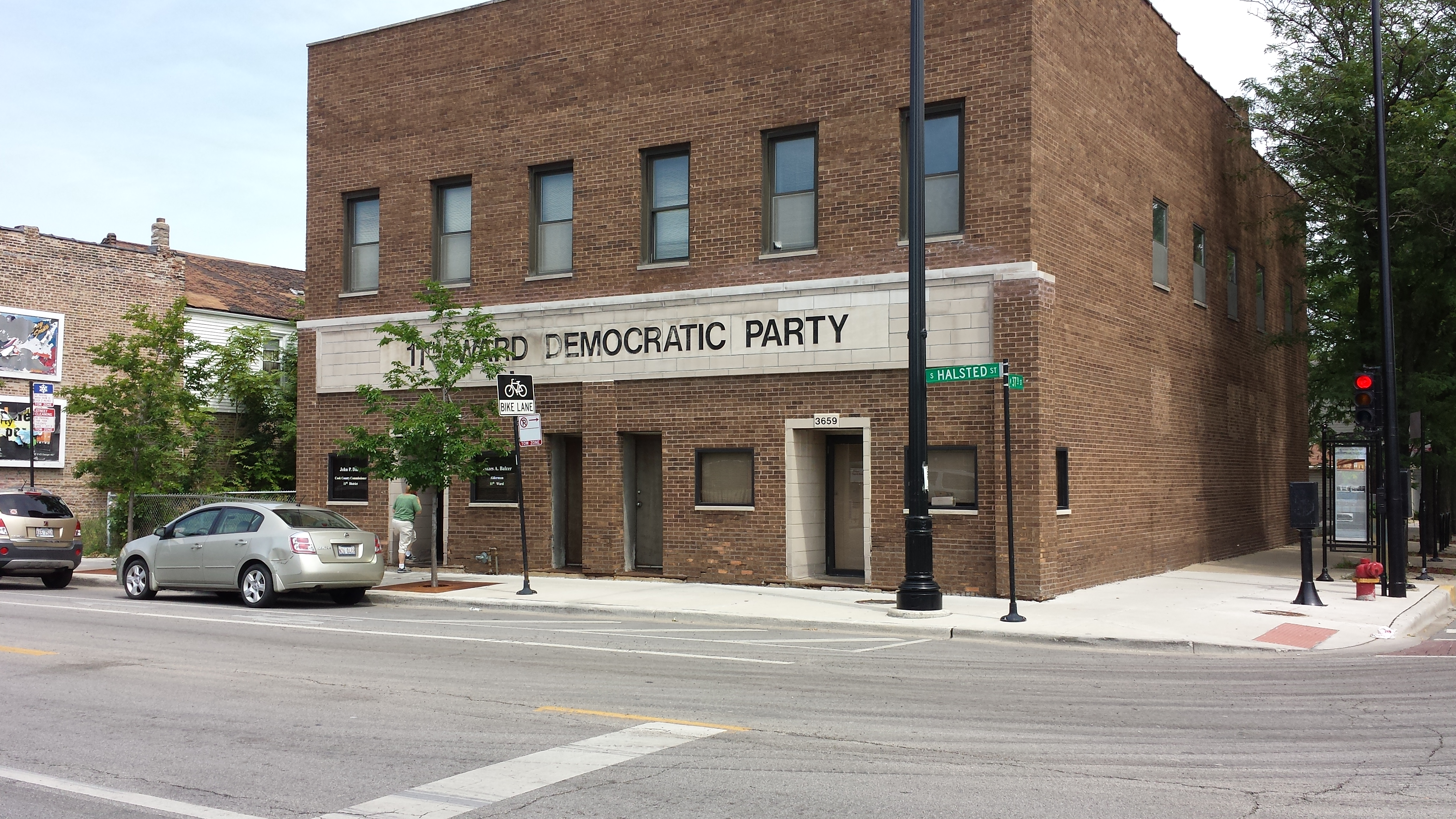
- 11th Ward Democratic Party ("Daley Machine") headquarters

- Current Chicago ward map, with 11th ward highlighted in red
- Coordinates: 41.838°N 87.646°W
- Country: United States
- State: Illinois
- County: Cook
- City: Chicago
- Established: 1863
- Communities: list: Bridgeport; Armour Square; Canaryville

Government
  - Type: Ward
  - Body: City of Chicago
  - Alderman: Nicole Lee (Democratic Party)
- Website: www.cityofchicago.org

2015 boundary of district

The 11th Ward is one of the 50 aldermanic wards with representation in the City Council of Chicago, Illinois. It is broken into 38 election precincts. Five Mayors of Chicago have come from this ward: Edward Joseph Kelly, Martin H. Kennelly, Richard J. Daley, Michael A. Bilandic and Richard M. Daley.

The ward has had notable levels of political corruption. It is home to the headquarters of the so-called Daley machine and the 11th ward "...had by far the highest number of trucking firms benefitting from the City of Chicago's Hired Truck Program".

== Alderpersons ==
The current alderperson for the 11th ward is Nicole Lee.

Before 2021, alderpersons were formally known as "aldermen".

Previous aldermen include:

- Patrick Daley Thompson who, in 2022 was sentenced to four months in federal prison. His conviction arose from a federal indictment for "five counts of filing false tax returns and two counts of lying to the FDIC".
- James Balcer
- Pat Huels, resigned due to conflicts of interest
- Michael Anthony Bilandic
- Matthew J. Danaher, indicted
- Amos G. Throop
- George Bell Swift
- Lester L. Bond

=== 1863–1923 ===
From the creation of the district in 1863 until 1923, it was represented by two aldermen elected to two-year terms. Elections were staggered.

Aldermen					# Council	Aldermen				
Alderman	Term in office	Party	Notes	Cite	# Council	Alderman	Term in office	Party	Notes	Cite
Lester L. Bond	1863–1866	Republican	Later elected alderman again in 1871 in 10th ward		27th	George Von Hollen	1863–1865			
Lester L. Bond	1863–1866	Republican	Later elected alderman again in 1871 in 10th ward		28th	George Von Hollen	1863–1865			
Lester L. Bond	1863–1866	Republican	Later elected alderman again in 1871 in 10th ward		29th	S.I. Russell	1865–1869			
Henry Ackhoff	1866–1868				30th	S.I. Russell	1865–1869			
Henry Ackhoff	1866–1868				31st	S.I. Russell	1865–1869			
B.F. Russell	1868–1870				32nd	S.I. Russell	1865–1869			
B.F. Russell	1868–1870				33rd	S.I. Russell	1865–1869			
B.F. Russell	1868–1870				34th	James Walsh	1869–1871		Later elected in 1883 in 10th ward	
Herman O. Glade	1970–1872				35th	James Walsh	1869–1871		Later elected in 1883 in 10th ward	
Herman O. Glade	1970–1872				36th	Henry Sweet	1871–1873			
T.T. Verdier	1972				36th	Henry Sweet	1871–1873			
Patrick Kehoe	1872–1874				37th	Henry Sweet	1871–1873			
Patrick Kehoe	1872–1874				38th	George E. White	1873–1876	Republican	Redistricted to 10th ward in 1876	
S. F. Gunderson	1874–1875				39th	George E. White	1873–1876	Republican	Redistricted to 10th ward in 1876	
J.G. Briggs	1876–1877				40th	Amos G. Throop	1876–1880		Previously served in 4th ward	
Ansel B. Cooke	1877–1879				41st	Amos G. Throop	1876–1880		Previously served in 4th ward	
Ansel B. Cooke	1877–1879				42nd	Amos G. Throop	1876–1880		Previously served in 4th ward	
George Bell Swift	1879–1881	Republican	Later served again		43rd	Amos G. Throop	1876–1880		Previously served in 4th ward	
George Bell Swift	1879–1881	Republican	Later served again		44th	Thomas N. Bond	1880–1886	Republican		
Thaddeus Dean	1881–1883	Republican			45th	Thomas N. Bond	1880–1886	Republican		
Thaddeus Dean	1881–1883	Republican			46th	Thomas N. Bond	1880–1886	Republican		
Samuel Simons	1883–1887	Republican			47th	Thomas N. Bond	1880–1886	Republican		
Samuel Simons	1883–1887	Republican			48th	Thomas N. Bond	1880–1886	Republican		
Samuel Simons	1883–1887	Republican			49th	Thomas N. Bond	1880–1886	Republican		
Samuel Simons	1883–1887	Republican			50th	Samuel Kerr	1886–1888	Republican		
John J. Badenoch	1887–1889				51st	Samuel Kerr	1886–1888	Republican		
John J. Badenoch	1887–1889				52nd	Walter M. Pond	1888–1892			
William D. Kent	1889–1895				53rd	Walter M. Pond	1888–1892			
William D. Kent	1889–1895				54th	Walter M. Pond	1888–1892			
William D. Kent	1889–1895				55th	Walter M. Pond	1888–1892			
William D. Kent	1889–1895				56th	George Bell Swift	1892–1894	Republican	had previously served; was acting mayor Nov. 9–Dec. 27, 1893	
William D. Kent	1889–1895				57th	George Bell Swift	1892–1894	Republican	had previously served; was acting mayor Nov. 9–Dec. 27, 1893	
William D. Kent	1889–1895				58th	Alexander H. Watson	1894–1896	Republican		
Charles E. Hambleton	1895–1897				59th	Alexander H. Watson	1894–1896	Republican		
Charles E. Hambleton	1895–1897				60th	—N/a				
George Duddleson	1897–1901				61st	—N/a				
George Duddleson	1897–1901				62nd	Robert K. Colson	1898–1900			
George Duddleson	1897–1901				63rd	Robert K. Colson	1898–1900			
George Duddleson	1897–1901				64th	Nicholas R. Finn	1900–1901		Redistricted to 20th ward in 1901	
Charles J. Byrne	1901–1902	Democratic	Redistricted from 9th ward		65th	Edward Cullerton	1901–1920	Democratic	Previously served in 6th, 7th, and 9th wards; died in office	
Charles J. Moertel	1902–1904				66th	Edward Cullerton	1901–1920	Democratic	Previously served in 6th, 7th, and 9th wards; died in office	
Charles J. Moertel	1902–1904				67th	Edward Cullerton	1901–1920	Democratic	Previously served in 6th, 7th, and 9th wards; died in office	
Peter K. Hoffman	1904–1908				68th	Edward Cullerton	1901–1920	Democratic	Previously served in 6th, 7th, and 9th wards; died in office	
Peter K. Hoffman	1904–1908				69th	Edward Cullerton	1901–1920	Democratic	Previously served in 6th, 7th, and 9th wards; died in office	
Peter K. Hoffman	1904–1908				70th	Edward Cullerton	1901–1920	Democratic	Previously served in 6th, 7th, and 9th wards; died in office	
Peter K. Hoffman	1904–1908				71st	Edward Cullerton	1901–1920	Democratic	Previously served in 6th, 7th, and 9th wards; died in office	
Otto J. Novak	1908–1910				72nd	Edward Cullerton	1901–1920	Democratic	Previously served in 6th, 7th, and 9th wards; died in office	
Otto J. Novak	1908–1910				73rd	Edward Cullerton	1901–1920	Democratic	Previously served in 6th, 7th, and 9th wards; died in office	
Frank P. Danisch	1910–1912				74th	Edward Cullerton	1901–1920	Democratic	Previously served in 6th, 7th, and 9th wards; died in office	
Frank P. Danisch	1910–1912				75th	Edward Cullerton	1901–1920	Democratic	Previously served in 6th, 7th, and 9th wards; died in office	
Frank W. Bewersdorf	1912–1914				76th	Edward Cullerton	1901–1920	Democratic	Previously served in 6th, 7th, and 9th wards; died in office	
Frank W. Bewersdorf	1912–1914				77th	Edward Cullerton	1901–1920	Democratic	Previously served in 6th, 7th, and 9th wards; died in office	
Cleophas F. Pettkoske	1914–1916				78th	Edward Cullerton	1901–1920	Democratic	Previously served in 6th, 7th, and 9th wards; died in office	
Cleophas F. Pettkoske	1914–1916				79th	Edward Cullerton	1901–1920	Democratic	Previously served in 6th, 7th, and 9th wards; died in office	
Herman Krumdrick	1916–1920	Democratic			80th	Edward Cullerton	1901–1920	Democratic	Previously served in 6th, 7th, and 9th wards; died in office	
Herman Krumdrick	1916–1920	Democratic			81st	Edward Cullerton	1901–1920	Democratic	Previously served in 6th, 7th, and 9th wards; died in office	
Herman Krumdrick	1916–1920	Democratic			82nd	Edward Cullerton	1901–1920	Democratic	Previously served in 6th, 7th, and 9th wards; died in office	
Herman Krumdrick	1916–1920	Democratic			83rd	Edward Cullerton	1901–1920	Democratic	Previously served in 6th, 7th, and 9th wards; died in office	
Dennis A. Horan	1920–1923		Continued as alderman after 1923, redistricted to 21st ward		84th	—N/a				
Dennis A. Horan	1920–1923		Continued as alderman after 1923, redistricted to 21st ward		85th	—N/a				
Dennis A. Horan	1920–1923		Continued as alderman after 1923, redistricted to 21st ward		86th	—N/a				

=== 1923–present ===
Since 1923, the district has been a single-member district.

Alderperson	Term in office	Party	Notes	Cite
Timothy A. Hogan				
John P. Wilson				
Thomas A. Doyle		Democratic		
Hugh B. Connelly				
John F. Wall				
Stanley J. Nowakowski				
Matthew J. Danaher				
Michael A. Bilandic	June 12, 1969 – June 7, 1977	Democratic	became acting mayor on December 28, 1976; resigned from council after being elected mayor in a special election	
Patrick M. Huels		Democratic		
James Balcer	1997–2015	Democratic		
Patrick Daley Thompson	May 18, 2015 – February 14, 2022	Democratic		
Nicole Lee	March 28, 2022–present	Democratic	Appointed by Mayor Lori Lightfoot, re-elected in 2023	

== Demographics ==
As of 2015, the demographics of the ward were:

- Total Population: 51,497
- White: 37.3 percent
- Black: 4.77 percent
- Hispanic: 23.08 percent
- Asian: 34.05 percent.
