= Vermont State Board of Education =

Coordinates: 44.1992859°N 72.505683°W

The Vermont State Board of Education supervises and manages the Department of Education and the public school system. The board makes regulations governing attendance and records of attendance of all pupils; standards for student performance, adult basic education programs, approval of independent schools, disbursement of funds, and equal access to education for all Vermont students. The governor appoints the board with approval by the senate.

The board selects the Education Commissioner. The commissioner runs a department of 200 employees. In 2008, the commissioner's salary was $96,907.

== Current Board of Education ==
1. DIOP, Mohamed Bristol, VT
2. FEARON, Grey Panton, VT
3. GLEASON, Kim Grand Isle, VT
4. KOLBE, Tammy (Vice Chair) Warren, VT
5. JEPSON, Lyle Rutland, VT
6. LOVETT, Tom Waterford, VT
7. O’FARRELL, Jenna St. Johnsbury, VT
8. SAMUELSON, Jennifer Deck (Chair) Manchester Center, VT
9. WERNER, Rich East Dover, VT
10. GREENWOOD, Caleb (non-voting student member) Troy, VT
11. SAUNDERS, Zoie Interim Secretary, Agency of Education Montpelier, VT

== Board Meetings ==
Approved minutes, upcoming meetings, and related documents can be found on the State Board of Education website: https://education.vermont.gov/tag/minutes-state-board-education

== See also ==
- List of admission tests to colleges and universities
- Education in Vermont
- New England Association of Schools and Colleges (NEASC)
