= Rachel Weston =

American politician

Member of the Vermont House of Representatives from the Chittenden-3-3 district
- In office 2007–2012
- Preceded by: John Patrick Tracy

Personal details
- Born: 1981 (age 44–45)
- Party: Democratic
- Education: University of Massachusetts Amherst; University of Vermont
- Website: rachelweston.org

Rachel M. Weston (born 1981) is a former Vermont State Representative for the Chittenden-3-3 District representing Old North End, Downtown, and Waterfront in Burlington, Vermont. First elected in 2006, Weston stepped down from the legislature in 2012 to take a job working on women's political participation in the Middle East.

== Early life and career ==
She graduated from the University of Massachusetts Amherst in 2003 (BA, Anthropology) and the University of Vermont in 2006 (MPA, Public Administration). Prior to pursuing a Masters, she was a public school teacher and worked with community non-profit organizations. She served as President of the UVM Graduate Student Senate, and as a Campus Compact Civic Engagement Fellow. She was elected to serve in the 2007–2008, 2009–2010, and 2011-2012 legislatures. Weston was the youngest serving member of the Vermont State Legislature. She served as a member of the House Ways and Means Committee and the Natural Resources and Energy Committee.
