= The Equal Educational Opportunity Act =

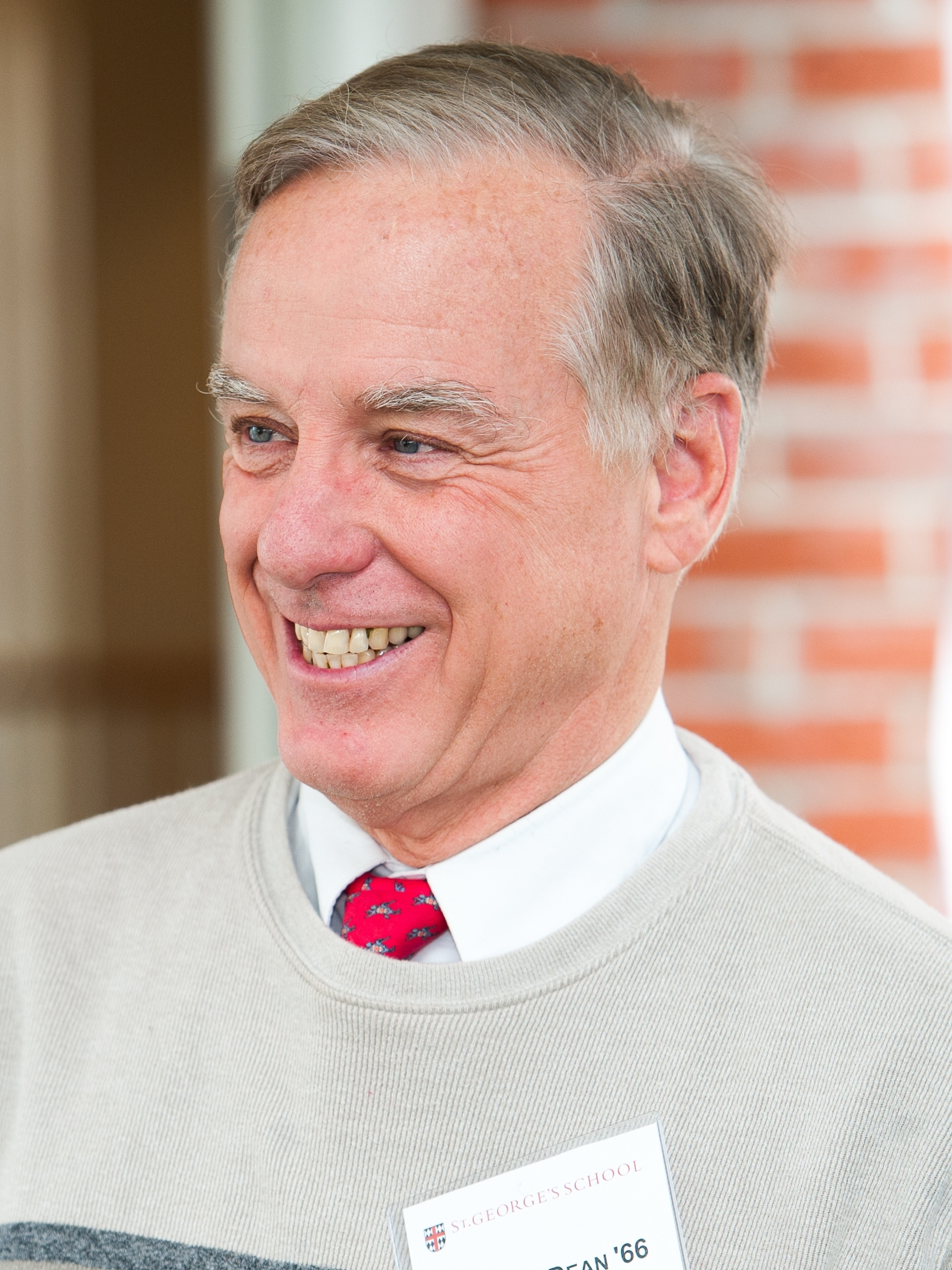
Governor Howard Dean (August 14, 1991 – January 9, 2003), who signed Act 60 into law.

Act 60, known as "The Equal Educational Opportunity Act", was a Vermont law enacted in June 1997 by the Vermont legislature intended to achieve a fair balance of educational spending across school districts, independent of the degree of prosperity within each district. The law was in response to a Vermont Supreme Court decision in the Brigham vs. State of Vermont case, wherein the court ruled that Vermont’s then existing educational funding system was unconstitutional, because it allowed students in towns with higher total property values to receive a higher level of education funding per pupil than students in towns with lower property values. Act 60 was followed by Acts 68 and 130, which addressed some imbalances caused by Act 60.

== State-wide education funding ==
In most local jurisdictions outside of Vermont, public school funding is determined within a school district by the following steps:

1. The school expenditure budget is set and non-tax income from grants and other sources is identified.
2. The difference between expected expenditures and non-tax income determines the amount to be raised by taxes.
3. Where taxes are raised by property tax, property values across a jurisdiction are assessed and each qualified property contributes to the total funds to be raised in property taxes in proportion to that property's fraction of the total property value of the jurisdiction.

In jurisdictions where the total value of property is large, compared with the funding to be raised, both the total taxes and the tax rate per unit of value are small compared to jurisdictions with a high level of funding to be raised and a small property value base. This is the basis for the education funding inequity addressed by the Vermont Supreme Court in Brigham vs. State of Vermont.

== Determination of funding required ==
To address the funding inequities among school districts, Act 60 and its amendments, Acts 68 and 130, established a system to pool the state's educational budgetary requirements from across jurisdictions and pay for them, in part, with pooled property taxes from across those same jurisdictions.

The provisions of Act 68 determine an individual district’s education spending as that part of an expenditure budget without a specific funding source. It includes:

- Special education costs not covered by federal aid and the state categorical grant
- Transportation costs not covered by the state categorical aid
- Tuition owed by the district
- General payroll and operation costs that do not have specific funding sources.

Education spending is that part of an expenditure budget without a specific funding source. Pre-Kindergarten through twelfth-grade education funding may be calculated for school districts according to:

Budget adopted by school district (town, city, union, incorporated) + Deficit from prior year (if any) = Total District Budgeted Expenditures

Then:

Total District Budgeted Expenditures – (State categorical grants, federal revenues, tuition revenues, interest income, etc.) = Education Spending

== Raising the required funds ==
According to a handbook example explaining the matter, the amount needed in the education fund in Fiscal Year (FY) 2012 to pay for grants and education spending was about $1.353 billion, which required revenues for the education fund from the following sources:

Funding Source	$ Millions
Nonresidential Education Property Tax	551
General Fund Transfer	276
One-third Sales & Use Tax	112
One-third Purchase & Use Tax	26
State Lottery	22
Medicaid Reimbursement	6
Vermont Yankee	2
Total raised	995

These sources left a $364-million gap in school funding for FY 2012 to be raised through property taxes on homesteads in Vermont.

=== Homestead property tax ===
Each year, the Vermont legislature sets a base amount that a school district will be expected to spend per pupil. Homestead property tax calculations are based on the amount per pupil that the district must raise over the base amount to fund its budget. In each school district, the property tax liability is established by the following method:

- The district's school board determines its educational spending level, described above.
- The educational spending level, divided by the "equalized pupil count" determines the district’s education spending per equalized pupil. The "equalized pupil" count, which assigns weights for different types of pupils, is designed to reflect the per capita spending in the district.
- The percentage increase of the district's per pupil spending over the state’s base education spending per pupil determines the percentage increase in property taxes over the level that would be required to fund the base homestead tax rate.

In principle, this method assures that all districts that have the same education spending per equalized pupil will have the same homestead tax rate. In order to achieve this principle, all properties in the state would have to be assessed in an equivalent manner.

==== Common Level of Appraisal ====
Because property tax rates are determined by the ratio of (total taxes to be raised to fund an expenditure budget) to (the total value of the properties subject to taxation), it is important to have all properties be assessed to an equivalent value across the state. Absent that, properties in school districts where the values lagged behind their fair market value would not contribute their fair share to statewide educational spending. In practice, each jurisdiction is responsible for assessing property values according to its own methods and on its own schedule. To establish an equivalent basis for property taxation, Act 60 establishes a common level of appraisal (CLA) for each school district.

The CLA helps to equalize how much towns pay, essentially by adjusting the appraised value of a homestead by looking at recent sale prices in town in comparison to the appraised values. If the appraised values are below the sale prices, the CLA raises the tax rate, and if the prices are below the appraised values, the CLA lowers the tax rate. This is done so that properties that have not been reappraised in several years are not able to pay lower taxes than a similarly valued homestead that was more recently reappraised.

==== Excess spending ====
The statute resulting from Act 68's revision of Act 60 has a disincentive for rich school districts to spend excessively. It penalizes districts with education spending per equalized pupil that exceed the threshold by 25%, will be subject to an additional tax rate. For each dollar spent above that threshold, the district must send an extra dollar to the state. The spending threshold for a school district excludes capital construction debt service spending.

=== Income sensitivity ===
As of 2011, Act 60 provided for taxpayers with lower incomes by adjusting property tax owed, according to a threshold income, as follows, according to the Vermont pamphlet. The homestead tax for eligible payers was to be reduced by an amount equal to the following:

- If household income is $90,000 or more, the property tax on the first $200,000 of housesite market value (house and up to two surrounding acres) minus the applicable percentage of the household income.
- If household income is less than $90,000 the homestead property tax on the first $500,000 of housesite market value minus the applicable percentage of the household income.

The mechanism to achieve this is to reduce tax bills by the adjustment amount.

== Acts 68 and 130 ==
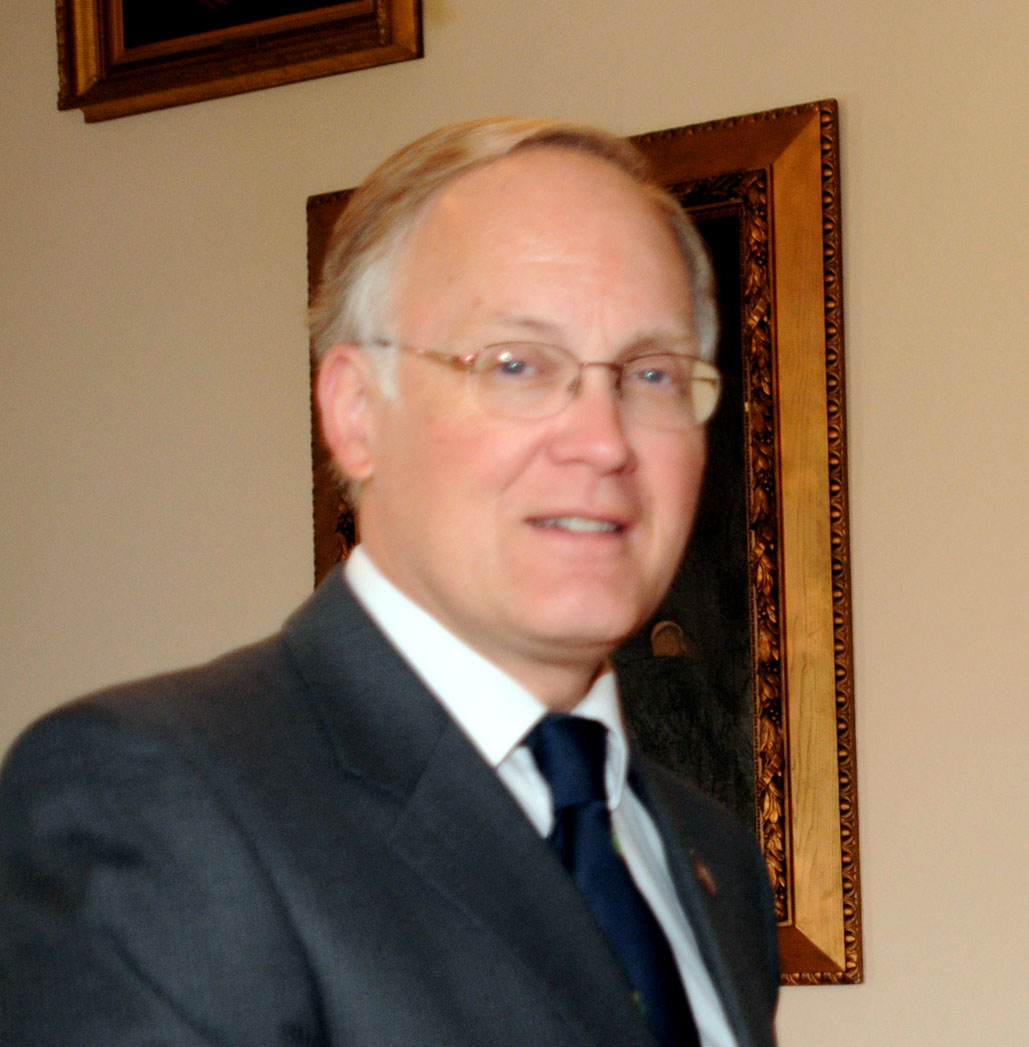
Governor Jim Douglas (January 9, 2003 – January 6, 2011), who signed Act 68 into law.

For most towns the "equalized yield" for any local taxes above the statewide level decreased property taxes and increased the funds available for their schools. However, certain ski towns, which had been spending much more per pupil than most districts, experienced the opposite result. These "Gold Towns" objected, but were generally satisfied with the 2003 resolution contained in Act 68, which continued "equalized yield" but gave those towns latitude to spend more at home. Act 68 also recognized that union districts require special recognition to determine an education spending per equalized pupil amount and a corresponding homestead tax rate in the district as whole, rather than assessing costs to member districts in order to receive money from the state’s education fund directly.

Act 130 clarified the distinction between governing entities (towns and cities) that raise taxes and educating entities that expend the funds raised. It based the homestead tax rate levied by a town on the average education spending per equalized pupil of all the pupils living in the taxing entity.

== Commentary ==
Proponents of the laws can cite success in increasing both spending in previously underfunded districts and student performance at the same time. Critics question whether the burden is unfairly shifted to property rich towns.

=== Favorable ===
The Vermont legislature hired Lawrence O Picus And Associates LLC of California to conduct a study to assess whether the laws had the effect of equalizing spending among towns by factoring out property wealth. Their report indicates that the Vermont school funding system “is working well and meeting the goals established in Acts 60 and 68. Using a series of objective measures,” it found that some towns that have seen a marked increase in spending have also seen an increase in student performance.

=== Unfavorable ===
Some critics of Act 60/68 have expressed concern about the disparity of contributions that wealthier towns sometimes make compared to the benefits that they receive through the funding formula. For example, Dover, Vermont reportedly contributed $11 million to state education funding, while only receiving $2 million in 2000. In response, the town embarked on a study characterize the laws' impact on the local economy and study whether the laws had achieved an equal educational opportunity for town students, as the state legislation was intended. Killington, Vermont was considering the net effects of the laws on its economy, when in 2012 it established a committee to study tax reform. As part of its charge, the committee was to study how significantly the state property tax burden has increased since Act 60 was passed in 1997.

On December 24, 2019 a Pupil Weighting Factors Report, commissioned by the Generally Assembly, was released. On January 29, 2020, Vermont Secretary of Education Dan French testified to the Vermont legislature that the mechanics of the educational funding system consistent with the Report needed to be addressed to ensure equal tax effort and to establish the necessary financial preconditions for equal educational opportunity.
