= Homeland Security Grant Program =

American federal grant program

Seal of the United States Department of Homeland Security

Homeland Security Grant Program (HSGP) is a program in the United States established in 2003 and was designated to incorporate all projects that provide funding to local, state, and Federal government agencies by the Department of Homeland Security. The purpose of the grants is to purchase surveillance equipment, weapons, and advanced training for law enforcement personnel in order to heighten security. The HSGP helps fulfill one of the core missions of the Department of Homeland Security by enhancing the country's ability to prepare for, prevent, respond to and recover from potential attacks and other hazards. The HSGP is one of the main mechanisms in funding the creation and maintenance of national preparedness, which refers to the establishment of plans, procedures, policies, training, and equipment at the Federal, State, and local level that is needed to maximize the ability to prevent, respond to, and recover from major events such as terrorist attacks, major disasters, and other emergencies. The HSGP's creation stemmed from the consolidation of six original projects that were previously funded by the Office of State and Local Government Coordination and Preparedness. The HSGP now encompasses five projects in the program: State Homeland Security Program, Urban Areas Security Initiative, Operation Stonegarden, Metropolitan Medical Response System Program, and Citizen Corps Program. During the 2010 fiscal year, the Department of Homeland Security will spend $1,786,359,956 on the Homeland Security Grant Program.

== Core program priorities ==
As stated by the U.S. Department of Homeland Security, these four areas of mission-supporting responsibilities are what drive the Homeland Security Grant Program:

- Protecting the United States from terrorist threats is the founding principle and highest priority.
- Securing the Nation’s southern and northern borders along with air and sea ports of entry.
- Facilitating legal immigration and naturalizing new Americans, while prosecuting those who violate the country's laws.
- Helping communities prepare, respond and recover from all facets of disaster.

== Current projects ==
The HSGP encompasses three projects with over $1 billion in funding available for FY 2017: the State Homeland Security Program ($402 million), the Urban Areas Security Initiative ($580 million), Operation Stonegarden ($55 million). The HSGP previously included other projects, including the Metropolitan Medical Response System Program and Citizen Corps, but beginning in 2012, these projects were no longer part of the HSGP.

=== State Homeland Security Program (SHSP) ===
This grant program offers a total of $402 million to enhance the state and local levels' ability to implement the goals and objectives of each state's individual preparedness report, which is one of the first steps in moving the grant processes, programs, and planning from a focus on loosely affiliated equipment, training, exercises and technical assistance projects to one that delivers a picture of prevention, protection, response and recovery capacity. In correspondence with the Implementing Recommendations of the 9/11 Commission Act of 2007 (Public Law 110-53) (9/11 Act), states receiving funding are legally required to ensure that at least 25 percent of the appropriated funds are dedicated to the planning, organization, training, exercise and equipment necessary for terrorism prevention. Additionally, SHSP funds may be used to facilitate secure identification including REAL ID, enhanced driver's licenses, Transportation Worker Identification Credential (TWIC), and first responder credentialing. Only those items specified on the "authorized equipment list" are eligible to be purchased by SHSP funding. Authorized items fall into the following 18 categories: personal protective equipment (fully encapsulated liquid and vapor protection ensemble, chemical resistant gloves, etc.) explosive device mitigation and remediation equipment (ballistic threat body armor, real-time x-ray unit, etc.), chemical, biological, radiological, nuclear and high-yield explosive (CBRNE) search and rescue equipment (rescue ropes and ladder, confined space kits, etc.), interoperable communications equipment (personal alert safety system, antenna and tower systems, etc.), detection equipment (M-8 detection paper for chemical agent identification, photo-ionization detector, etc.), decontamination equipment (decontamination litters/roller systems, high efficiency particulate air vacuum, etc.), physical security enhancement equipment (motion detector systems, radar systems, etc.), terrorism incident prevention equipment (joint regional information exchange system, law enforcement surveillance equipment, etc.), CBRNE logistical support equipment (equipment trailers, handheld computers for emergency response applications, etc.), CBRNE incident response vehicles (hazardous materials vehicles, mobile morgue unit, etc.) medical supplies and limited types of pharmaceuticals (automatic biphasic external defibrillators and carry bags, epinephrine, etc.) CBRNE reference materials (National Fire Protection Association guide to hazardous materials, National Institute for Occupational Safety and Health hazardous materials pocket guide, etc.), agricultural terrorism prevention, response and mitigation equipment (animal restraints, blood sampling supplies, etc.), CBRNE response watercraft (surface boats and vessels for port homeland security purposes), CBRNE aviation equipment (fixed-wing aircraft, helicopters, etc.), cyber security enhancement equipment (firewall and authentication technologies, geographic information systems, etc.), intervention equipment (tactical entry equipment, specialized response vehicles and vessels, etc.), and other authorized equipment (installation costs for authorized equipment, shipping costs of equipment, etc.).

=== Urban Areas Security Initiative (UASI) ===
The Urban Areas Security Initiative program makes $580 million available to enhance regional preparedness in major metropolitan areas throughout the United States. The UASI program directly supports expanding regional collaboration and is meant to assist participants in their creation of regional systems for prevention, protection, response, and recovery. Again, in correspondence with the 9/11 Act, states are required to ensure that at least 25 percent of appropriated funding is dedicated to terrorism prevention planning, organization, training, exercise, and equipment. State Administrative Agencies (Department of Public Safety, State Office of Homeland Security, Emergency Management Agency, etc.) are the only groups eligible to apply directly to FEMA for UASI grants.

==== Regional recipients ====
The Recipients of the UASI program include the 64 highest risk Urban Areas in the country, which are divided into the 10 highest risk areas (Tier 1) and the remaining 54 areas (Tier 2). These areas are determined by the DHS by examining the relative risk of the 100 most populous Metropolitan Statistical Areas defined by the Office of Management and Budget. Relative risk is determined in a three-step process that analyzes urban areas and states based on threat, vulnerability and consequence measurements, an effectiveness assessment of applicants’ investment justifications, and then the final allocation decision.

- Tier 1 areas: Los Angeles/Long Beach, San Francisco Bay, the National Capital Region, Chicago, Boston, Jersey City/Newark, New York City, Philadelphia, Houston, and Dallas/Fort Worth/Arlington.
- Tier 2 areas: Phoenix, Tucson, San Diego, Anaheim/Santa Ana, Riverside, Sacramento, Oxnard, Bakersfield, Denver, Bridgeport, Hartford, Miami, Tampa, Fort Lauderdale, Jacksonville, Orlando, Atlanta, Honolulu, Indianapolis, Louisville, New Orleans, Baton Rouge, Baltimore, Detroit, Minneapolis/St. Paul, St. Louis, Kansas City, Omaha, Las Vegas, Buffalo, Rochester, Albany, Syracuse, Charlotte, Cleveland, Cincinnati, Columbus, Toledo, Oklahoma City, Tulsa, Portland, Pittsburgh, San Juan, Providence, Memphis, Nashville, San Antonio, El Paso, Austin, Salt Lake City, Norfolk, Seattle, and Milwaukee.

=== Operation Stonegarden (OPSG) ===
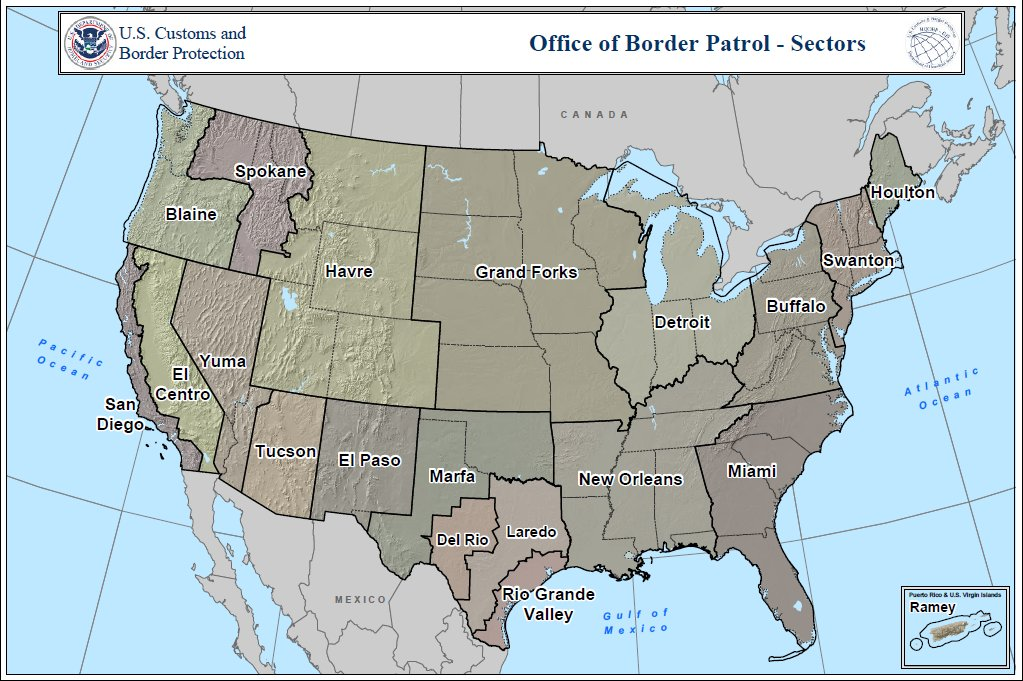
Map of the U.S. Border Patrol sectors, wherein OPSG seeks to aid border security

The intent of this $55 million program is to enhance coordination among local, state and federal law enforcement agencies to secure the borders with Mexico, Canada, and international waters. OPSG is intended to support U.S. border States and territories in increasing the nation's capability to handle border security issues, emphasizing the role of local operational groups in enhancing National and State Homeland Security (such as the Federal Secure Borders Initiative and U.S. Customs and Border Protection (CBP) strategies), increasing collaboration among all the levels of law enforcement agencies, continuing the enhancements required for border security, providing intelligence-based operations through U.S. Customs and Border Protection experts to ensure safety and operational oversight of law enforcement agencies participating in the projects operation, supporting the activation, deployment, or redeployment of specialized National Guard Units, Packages and elements of State law enforcement to enhance operational activities, and continuing to increase readiness of all law enforcement agencies. Those eligible for OPSG funding are local units of government at the county level and federally recognized tribal governments in the states bordering Canada, Mexico or those with international water borders. Allocations of funds, received from the Homeland Security Appropriations Act, 2010 (Public Law 110-83), are based on a risk-based prioritization by U.S. Customs and Border Protection’s sector-specific border risk methodology, which include "threat, vulnerability, miles of border and other border-specific law enforcement intelligence." On July 15, 2010, Secretary Napolitano announced that 80 percent of Operation Stonegarden funding will now be directed to Southwest border states, and tribal funding will be increased by $8.2 million to $10 million in FY 2010.

=== Metropolitan Medical Response System (MMRS) Program ===
In 2011, the Metropolitan Medical Response System program made $34.9 million available for the integration of emergency management, health, and medical systems into an organized response to mass casualty incidents such as nuclear, biological or chemical terrorist incidents. Successful MMRS grantees will be provided with the necessary resources to reduce the potential costs of a mass casualty incident during the initial stages of an incident by having proper coordinated response systems, such as equipment and supplies procurement, emergency triage and pre-hospital treatment/emergency medical services, hospital evacuation, patient tracking, etc. already in place. Aside from the typical local, regional and state emergency response agencies, the MMRS also includes facets of response such as disaster medical assistance teams and disaster mortuary operational response teams that may be federalized in disaster situations. The program created 124 local MMRS jurisdictions, in which the $39.36 million budget is distributed evenly. The 124 jurisdictions are encouraged to collaborate closely with local, regional, and State health and medical partners, such as Medical Reserve Corps Units, Citizen Corps Councils, the U.S. Department of Health and Human Services Assistant Secretary for Preparedness and Response, the Centers for Disease Control's Cities Readiness Initiative, and Strategic National Stockpile programs.

=== Citizen Corps Program (CCP) ===
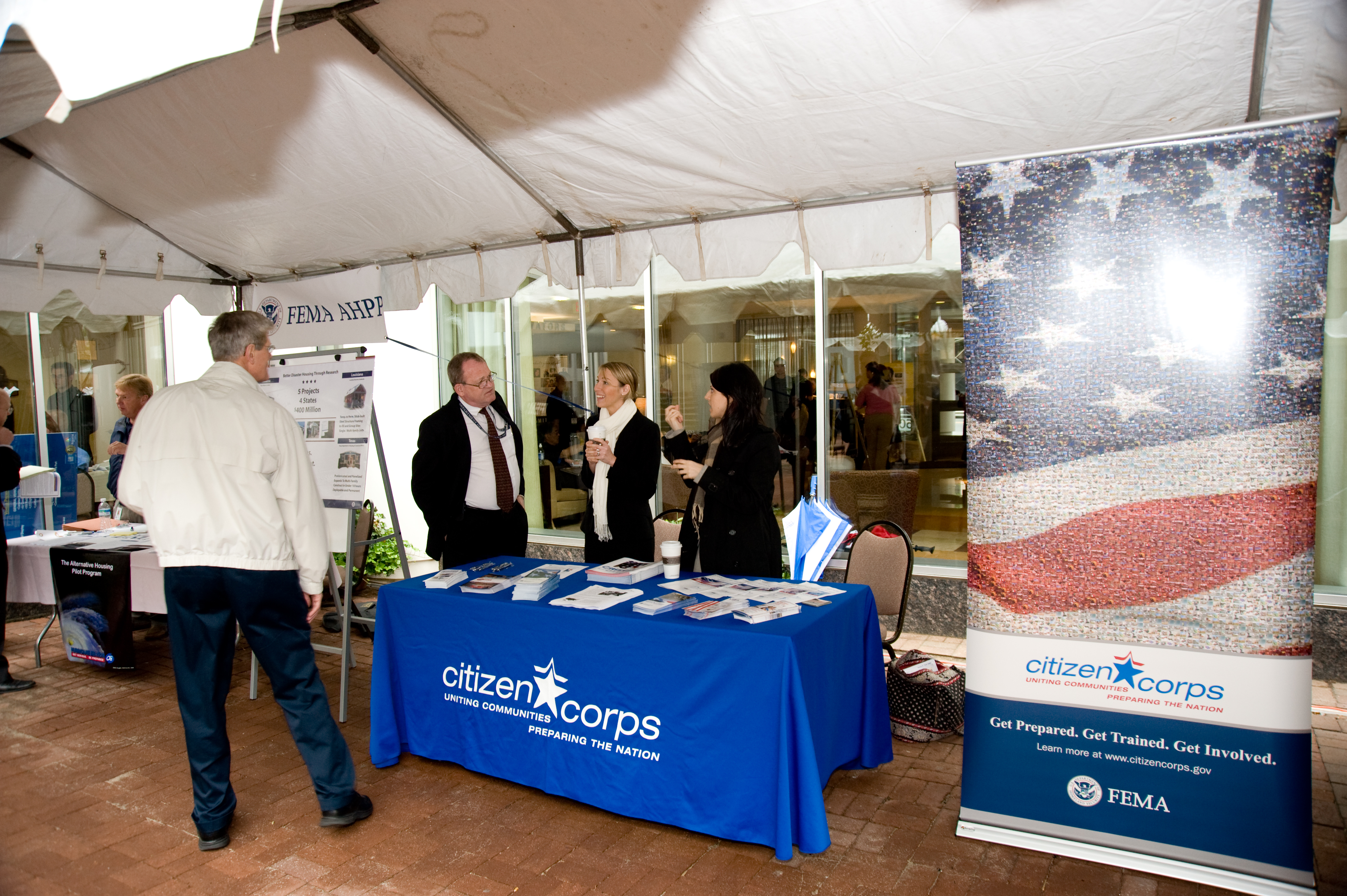
The Citizen Corps booth at FEMA's Hurricane Awareness Day at FEMA Headquarters to raise awareness and community emergency preparedness

In 2011, the Citizen Corps made $9.98 million in grant funding available for integrating the community and government to better coordinate local involvement in the preparation, planning, mitigation, response and recovery stages of emergencies. The main mission of the Citizen Corps is to utilize every resource by means of education, training, and volunteer service to local security and readiness to respond to threats of terror, crime, health issues, and disasters. CCP allocations are determined using the USA PATRIOT Act formula, which specifies that each of the 50 states, the District of Columbia, and the Commonwealth of Puerto Rico will receive a minimum of 75 percent of the total available grant funding. This leaves the remaining 25 percent of the total available grant funding to be allocated to the four territories of American Samoa, Guam, Northern Mariana Islands and the U.S. Virgin Islands. The balance of CCP funds are to be distributed on a population-share basis among all of the recipients.

== Funding concerns and criticisms ==
Some criticism of the Homeland Security Grant Program has come from the distribution of funds. Not unlike other federal funding programs, the HSGP distributes a portion of funding based on population and distributes the remainder of funding evenly. For its part, the HSGP distributes 60% of funds on the basis of population, and the other 40% is evenly spread across all recipients regardless of population. Wyoming for instance, despite being the least populous state, received more funding per capita in homeland security grants than any other state in 2004. At $45.22 per citizen of the state, Wyoming received more than four times the amount of funding per citizen given to either California or New York. Another criticism has come from the Government Accountability Office (GAO) in regards to the risk-based grant methodology. Although the GAO concluded that the overall risk-based methodology (threat, vulnerability and consequences) was reasonable, the absence of a proper way to measure variations in vulnerability greatly reduce the value of the vulnerability portion of the assessment. Ultimately, they concluded that the vulnerability measure as part of its risk analysis model should be amended to better capture variations in vulnerability across the different states and urban areas it assesses.

=== News ===
- "SoCal gets nearly $53m in Homeland Security funds", Associated Press, 8/9/2010

== See also ==
- Homeland Security Act
- Operation Virtual Shield
- Surveillance
- MATRIX
- Fusion center
