= Vermont Statutes Annotated =

Laws of the state

The Vermont Statutes Annotated is the official codification of the laws enacted by the General Assembly of the U.S. state of Vermont.

== Vermont Statutes ==
- Title 1: General Provisions
- Title 2: Legislature
- Title 3: Executive
- Title 3 Appendix: Executive Orders
- Title 4: Judiciary
- Title 5: Aeronautics and Surface Transportation
- Title 6: Agriculture
- Title 7: Alcoholic Beverages
- Title 8: Banking and Insurance
- Title 9: Commerce and Trade
- Title 9A: Uniform Commercial Code
- Title 10: Conservation and Development
- Title 10 Appendix: Conservation and Development
- Title 11: Corporations, Partnerships and Associations
- Title 11A: Vermont Business Corporations
- Title 11B: Nonprofit Corporations
- Title 12: Court Procedure
- Title 13: Crimes and Criminal Procedure
- Title 14: Decedents' Estates and Fiduciary Relations
- Title 15: Domestic Relations
- Title 15A: Adoption Act
- Title 15B: Uniform Interstate Family Support Act (1996)
- Title 16: Education
- Title 16 Appendix: Education Charters and Agreements
- Title 17: Elections
- Title 18: Health
- Title 19: Highways
- Title 20: Internal Security and Public Safety
- Title 21: Labor
- Title 22: Libraries, History, and Information Technology
- Title 23: Motor Vehicles
- Title 24: Municipal and County Government
- Title 24 Appendix: Municipal Charters
- Title 25: Navigation and Waters
- Title 26: Professions and Occupations
- Title 27: Property
- Title 27A: Uniform Common Interest Ownership Act (1994)
- Title 28: Public Institutions and Corrections
- Title 29: Public Property and Supplies
- Title 30: Public Service
- Title 31: Recreation and Sports
- Title 32: Taxation and Finance
- Title 33: Human Services

== See also ==
- Government of Vermont
- Vermont Law School, the only law school in Vermont
- Vermont court system
- Vermont Supreme Court
