= Windham-3-1 Vermont Representative District, 2002–2012 =

One-member state representative district in Vermont

Coordinates: 42°52′N 72°37′W

The Windham-3-1 Representative District is a one-member state Representative district in the U.S. state of Vermont. It is one of the 108 one or two member districts into which the state was divided by the redistricting and reapportionment plan developed by the Vermont General Assembly following the 2000 U.S. census. The plan applies to legislatures elected in 2002, 2004, 2006, 2008, and 2010. A new plan will be developed in 2012 following the 2010 United States census.

The Windham-3-1 District includes a section of the Windham County town of Brattleboro defined as follows:

That portion of the Town of Brattleboro to the west of a boundary beginning at Upper Dummerston Road at the Dummerston town line, then southeasterly along the centerline of Upper Dummerston Road to Interstate 91, then southerly along the median of Interstate 91 to Williams Street, then easterly along the centerline of Williams Street to where the Whetstone Brook crosses, then southwesterly along the western bank of the Whetstone Brook to Lamson Street and southerly along the centerline of Lamson Street to Chestnut Street, then westerly along the centerline of Chestnut Street to Interstate 91, then southerly along the median of Interstate 91 to the Guilford town line.

— Vermont Statutes, Title 17, Chapter 34, Section 1893a

The rest of the town of Brattleboro is in Windham-3-2 and Windham-3-3.

As of the 2000 census, the state as a whole had a population of 608,827. As there are a total of 150 representatives, there were 4,059 residents per representative (or 8,118 residents per two representatives). The one member Windham-3-1 District had a population of 4,148 in that same census, 2.19% above the state average.

== District representative ==
- Virginia A. Milkey, Democrat

== See also ==
- Members of the Vermont House of Representatives, 2005-2006 session
- Vermont Representative Districts, 2002-2012
