= Frederick Holbrook =

American farmer, businessman and politician (1813–1909)

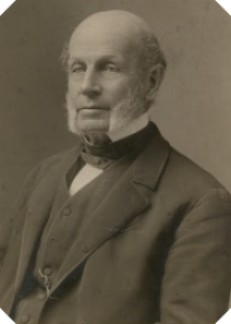
- Frederick Holbrook in 1901

27th Governor of Vermont
- In office October 11, 1861 – October 9, 1863
- Lieutenant: Levi Underwood; Paul Dillingham
- Preceded by: Erastus Fairbanks
- Succeeded by: J. Gregory Smith

Member of the Vermont Senate from Windham County
- In office 1849–1850 Serving with Peter W. Dean, John Tufts
- Preceded by: John Kimball, Peter W. Dean, Larkin G. Mead
- Succeeded by: Asa Wentworth Jr., John R. Blake, Ira Goodhue

President of the Vermont State Agricultural Society
- In office September 25, 1851 – January 10, 1859
- Preceded by: None (position created)
- Succeeded by: Epaphras Bull Chase

Register of Probate for the Marlboro District
- In office 1848–1861
- Preceded by: Broughton Harris
- Succeeded by: R. W. Clarke

Personal details
- Born: February 15, 1813 East Windsor, Connecticut, US
- Died: April 28, 1909 (aged 96) Brattleboro, Vermont, US
- Resting place: Prospect Hill Cemetery, Brattleboro, Vermont
- Party: Whig (before 1856); Republican (from 1856)
- Spouse: Harriet Goodhue (m. 1835-1887, her death)
- Relations: Luke Knowlton (grandfather)
- Children: 3
- Parent(s): Sarah (Knowlton) Holbrook; John Holbrook
- Profession: Farmer; Banker

Military service
- Allegiance: United States; Vermont
- Branch/service: Vermont Militia
- Years of service: 1833–1837
- Rank: Captain
- Commands: Brattleboro Floodwood Company

Frederick Holbrook (February 15, 1813 – April 28, 1909) was an American farmer, businessman, and politician from Vermont. Active in politics and government, first as a Whig, and later as a Republican, he was most notable for his service as the 27th governor of Vermont from 1861 to 1863.

A native of East Windsor, Connecticut, Holbrook was a son of Sarah (Knowlton) Holbrook and John Holbrook and a grandson of Luke Knowlton. He was raised in Vermont and educated at the Berkshire Gymnasium in Pittsfield, Massachusetts, then embarked on careers in farming and business as a resident of Brattleboro. Holbrook served briefly in the militia, and became active in local government as Register of Probate for the Marlboro District, an office he held from 1848 to 1861. He represented Windham County in the Vermont Senate from 1849 to 1850.

Holbrook became a Republican when the party was founded in the mid-1850s. In 1861 he was the party's successful nominee for governor. He was reelected in 1862 and served from October 1861 to October 1863. As the state's chief executive in the middle of the American Civil War, Holbrook oversaw Vermont's contribution to the Union effort, including raising more than ten Infantry regiments for the Union Army. In keeping with the Republican "Mountain Rule", Holbrook was not a candidate for reelection in 1863.

After leaving the governorship, Holbrook declined to be a candidate for any other office and returned to his Brattleboro farming and business interests, including serving as president of the Vermont Savings Bank and president of the Vermont Asylum for the Insane's board of trustees. He died in Brattleboro on April 28, 1909. Holbrook was buried at Prospect Hill Cemetery in Brattleboro.

== Early life ==
Holbrook was born in East Windsor, Connecticut on February 15, 1813, son of Sarah (Knowlton) Holbrook and John Holbrook, a notable publisher and businessman. Via his mother's family, he was the grandson of Luke Knowlton. He was raised in Brattleboro, Vermont, attended Berkshire Gymnasium in Pittsfield, Massachusetts for two years, then moved to Boston, where he remained for two years as a partner in the Richardson, Lord and Holbrook bookstore.

In 1833, Holbrook embarked on an extended visit to Europe. Upon his return in 1833, he settled in Brattleboro, where he became active in farming. He also became a member of Brattleboro's contingent of the Vermont State Militia, the Brattleboro Floodwood Company. (Note: In the 1830s, enrollment in the state militia was mandatory, but the state did not provide standard regulations or funding for equipment and uniforms. Individuals who could afford the necessary money and time formed independent companies, which were uniformed and fielded high-quality equipment. Regular companies were not uniformed and did not have standard equipment, so they became known as "floodwood companies", a reference to their use when necessary of sticks, pitchforks, hoes, and other farm implements in place of rifles.) Holbrook was soon elected to lead the unit with the rank of captain, and he commanded for several years in the mid-1830s.

A talented singer, while living in Boston, Holbrook was a member of the Handel and Haydn Society and a member of the choir directed by Lowell Mason. After settling in Brattleboro, Holbrook sang bass and directed the choir at the town's Centre Congregational Church for over 40 years. In 1840, he was one of the organizers of the Windham County Society for the Promotion of Sacred Music.

== Continued career ==
Holbrook took advantage of the farming knowledge he gained in Europe to prepare newspaper and magazine articles advocating for improved agricultural methods. In addition, he experimented and invented on his own farm, and among the implements he designed was an all-steel plow. In the 1850s, Holbrook was an associate editor of the New England Farmer magazine.

In addition to his interest in farming, Holbrook was active in several business ventures. In the 1830s, Holbrook and Franklin H. Fessenden took over the Holbrook & Fessenden paper mill from their fathers and other relatives and investors. They operated the business for several years until selling it to a new corporation, the Typographic Company. In 1851, Holbrook was an original incorporator of the Wantastiquet Railroad Company, which was intended to link several Windham County towns to either the Rutland & Burlington Railroad or the main line of the Western Vermont Railroad. In 1852, he was one of the incorporators who revived the charter for the Brattleboro Railroad, which had been granted in 1835 but had not been acted on, and was intended to connect Brattleboro with railroads in eastern New York state.

== Political career ==
Holbrook became active in politics, first as a Whig, and later as a Republican. He served in local offices, including town lister. Holbrook was elected register of probate for the district of Marlboro in 1847 and served until 1861. He represented Windham County in the Vermont Senate in 1849 and 1850, where, as chairman of a special committee on agriculture, he proposed to Congress the establishment of a national bureau of agriculture, the forerunner of the United States Department of Agriculture. He was a founder of the Vermont State Agricultural Society in 1851, and served as its president from 1851 to 1859.

== Governor of Vermont ==
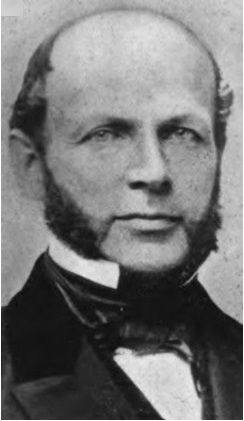
Holbrook as he appeared during his governorship, circa 1862

Holbrook's service as president of the state agricultural society gave him the name recognition necessary for a statewide political campaign, and he was the Republican nominee for governor in 1861. He was elected by a large majority, 33,152 votes to 5,722 for his nearest competitor, Andrew Tracy. He was reelected in 1862, receiving 29,543 votes; his nearest competitor, Benjamin H. Smalley, received 3,772.

Holbrook served as governor during what many consider the darkest days of the American Civil War. His administration saw the recruitment of ten infantry regiments, two light artillery batteries, and three sharpshooter companies. Under his administration, Vermont also built three military hospitals in the state which were "soon credited by the United States medical inspector with perfecting a larger percentage of cures than any United States military hospital record elsewhere could show."

After the September 1862 Battle of Antietam, Holbrook wrote to President Abraham Lincoln to suggest that the federal government issue a call for 500,000 additional troops to increase the Union Army's ranks. In the event that the Lincoln administration could not immediately bear the expenses of raising, equipping, and paying so many troops, Holbrook offered to have Vermont's state government pay up front for its contingent and accept reimbursement later. In addition, he stated his belief that other Union governors would do the same. Lincoln, who replied that he had been looking for a mechanism that would enable him to issue a call for troops, seized on Holbrook's letter to solicit a formal request by all the Union governors, which Holbrook and U.S. Provost Marshal General Simeon Draper procured and sent to Lincoln. Lincoln then used the governors' letter as justification to issue a call for 300,000 troops. Afterwards, Lincoln complimented Holbrook to his cabinet, saying that Holbrook's occasional letters offering suggestions and advice for how to prosecute the war effort were more sensible than what he received from the professional political class in and around Washington, D.C. In his second inaugural address in October 1862, Holbrook told the Vermont General Assembly "It is gratifying to realize that at each and every call of our country, in her hour of peril, thousands of the young men of our State have willingly and eagerly seized arms and have gone or are going forth to battle for the Union."

== Retirement ==
After his two terms as governor, he refused to be a candidate for elective office, but did take part in government activities in which he had an interest, including accepting appointment in 1870 as an original member of the state Board of Agriculture, Manufactures and Mining. He also resumed his farm and business interests, including serving as president of the Vermont Savings Bank. He was president of the board of trustees of the Vermont Asylum for the Insane for more than 40 years. When Cornell University created its College of Agriculture in 1868, Holbrook was appointed nonresident professor of Mechanics Applied to Agriculture, with a requirement to provide twenty lectures per academic year.

== Death ==
Holbrook died at his home in Brattleboro on April 28, 1909. He was buried at Prospect Hill Cemetery in Brattleboro. Holbrook's funeral was attended by former governors Ebenezer J. Ormsbee, John G. McCullough, Samuel E. Pingree, and Fletcher D. Proctor. Pallbearers included James Manning Tyler.

== Family ==
On January 13, 1835, Holbrook married to Harriet Goodhue (1817–1887), daughter of Joseph and Sarah Goodhue of Brattleboro. They were the parents of three sons— Franklin F., William C., and John.

Franklin F. Holbrook (1837–1916) was Vermont's military agent and liaison to the United States Department of War with the rank of colonel during his father's governorship. After the war he operated a Boston-based company that manufactured farm implements.

William C. Holbrook (1842–1904) served in the 4th and 7th Vermont Infantry Regiments during the Civil War. Afterwards, he attended Harvard Law School, practiced law in New York City, and served as judge of the city's court of special sessions.

John C. Holbrook (1852–1901), was active in business as a resident of Houtzdale, Pennsylvania.

== Legacy ==
In 1851, Holbrook received the honorary degree of Master of Arts from the University of Vermont. In 1862, he received an honorary M.A. from Dartmouth College. Holbrook received an honorary LL.D. from Norwich University in 1899.

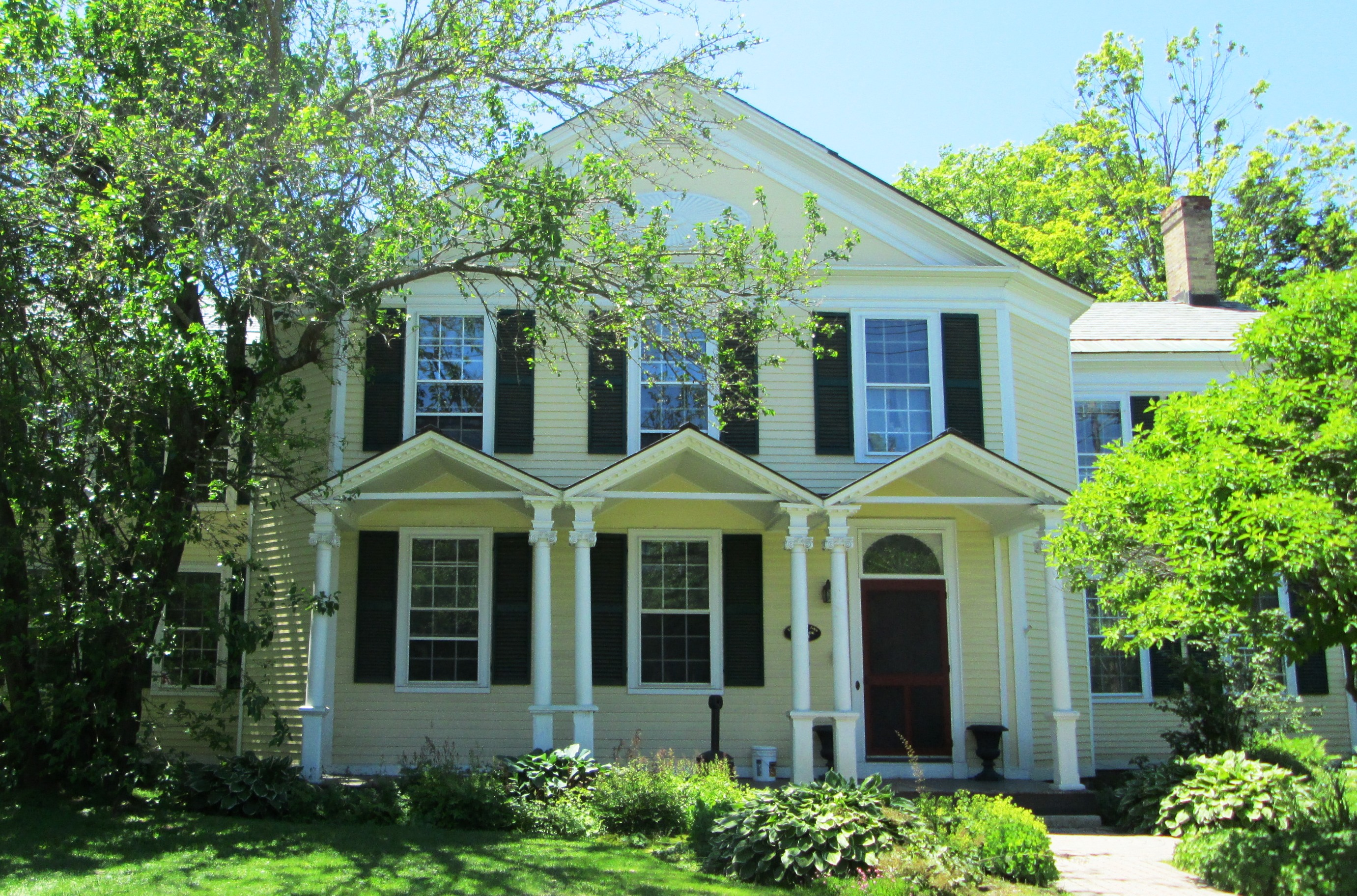
Deacon John Holbrook House, 80 Linden Street, Brattleboro, Vermont

The Deacon John Holbrook House on Linden Street in Brattleboro was built by Holbrook's father in the 1820s. It still stands and was added to the National Register of Historic Places in the 1980s.

== See also ==
- Vermont in the American Civil War

== Sources ==
- Dodge, Prentiss C., compiler. Encyclopedia Vermont Biography, Burlington, VT: Ullery Publishing Company, 1912, p. 40.
- Ullery, Jacob G., Men of Vermont: An Illustrated Biographical History of Vermonters and Sons of Vermont, Brattleboro, VT: Transcript Publishing Company, 1894, Part II, pp. 198–200.
- Frederick Holbrook at National Governors Association

Party political offices
| Preceded by Erastus Fairbanks | Republican nominee for Governor of Vermont; 1861, 1862 | Succeeded by J. Gregory Smith |
Political offices
| Preceded by Erastus Fairbanks | Governor of Vermont; 1861–1863 | Succeeded by J. Gregory Smith |
