= Deacon John Holbrook House =

Historic house in Vermont, United States

- U.S. National Register of Historic Places
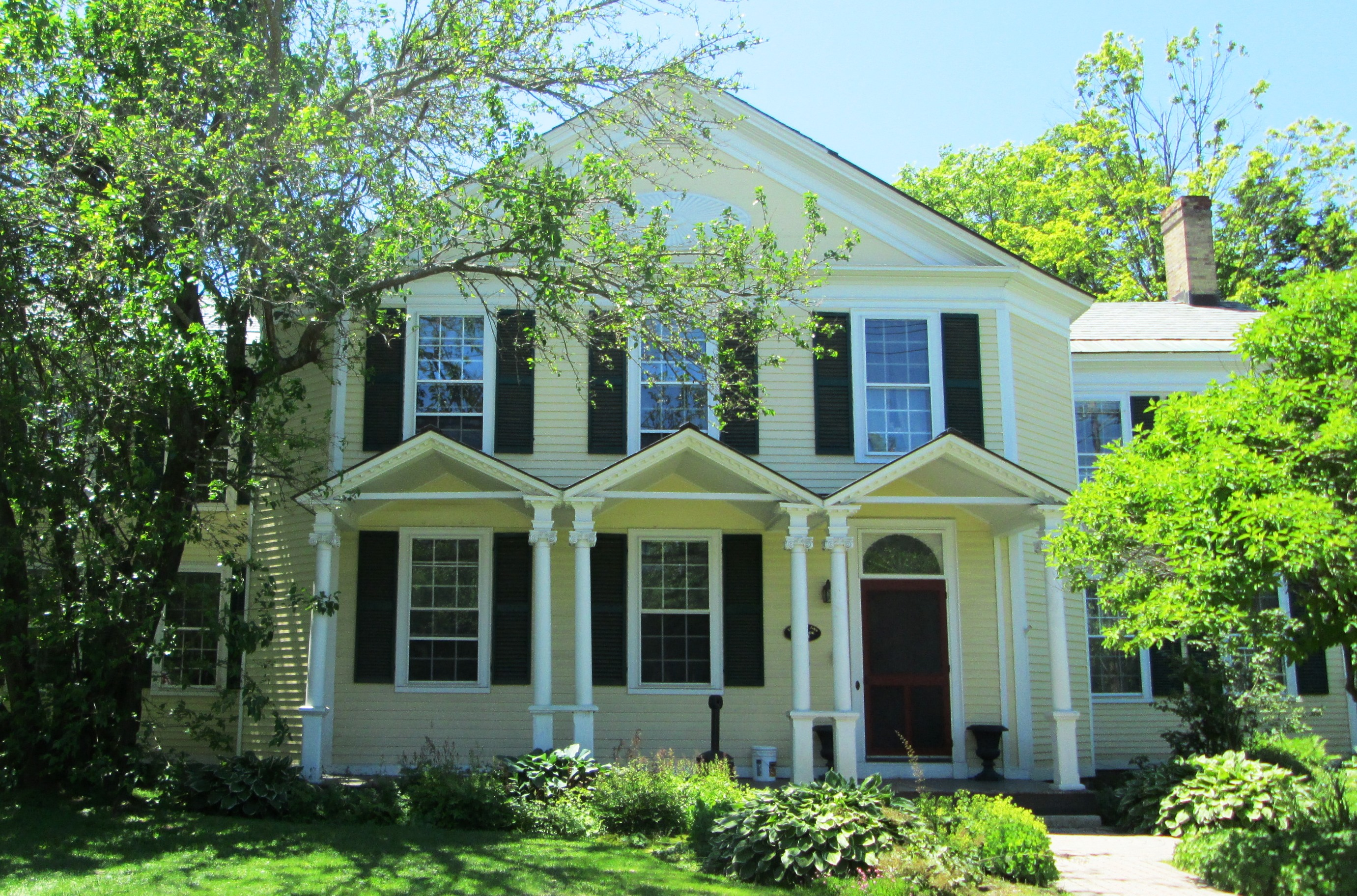

- Location within Vermont Location within the United States
- Location: 80 Linden St., Brattleboro, Vermont
- Coordinates: 42°51′24″N 72°33′43″W
- Area: less than one acre
- Built: 1825
- Built by: Nathaniel Bliss
- Architect: Nathaniel Bliss
- Architectural style: Federal
- NRHP reference No.: 82001709
- Added to NRHP: March 19, 1982

The Deacon John Holbrook House is a historic building at 80 Linden Street in Brattleboro, Vermont. Built in 1825 for prominent local businessman John Holbrook, it is a high-quality example of Federal period architecture. It was listed on the National Register of Historic Places in 1982. It now houses professional offices.

== Description and history ==
The Holbrook House is located north of downtown Brattleboro, at the northwest corner of Linden and Chapin Streets, across from the town common. Linden Street is a major continuation of Brattleboro's Main Street. The house is a roughly L-shaped 2 1/2-story wood-frame structure, with a gabled roof and clapboard siding. Its front facade, facing Linden Street, has a projecting three-bay section with angled sides, with similar single-story gabled porches set in front of each bay. The porches are supported by slender smooth round Ionic columns set on high square posts, with the adjoining posts joined at the top of the post. The entrance is set on the rightmost bay, topped by a Federal style fanlight. The gable above the projecting section is flushboarded, with a sunburst motif at the center.

The 1825 house was built by Nathaniel Bliss, a local carpenter, and apparently was designed by Bliss as well. John Holbrook, a Massachusetts native, worked in what is now southern Vermont as a surveyor, and eventually became part-owner of a general store in Newfane. He expanded his business interests, importing and exporting goods from Brattleboro via the Connecticut River, and was one of the owners of the first flat-bottomed boat to ply that river. A son of John Holbrook, Frederick Holbrook, became the 27th governor of Vermont.

== See also ==
- National Register of Historic Places listings in Windham County, Vermont
