= Creamery Covered Bridge =

- U.S. National Register of Historic Places
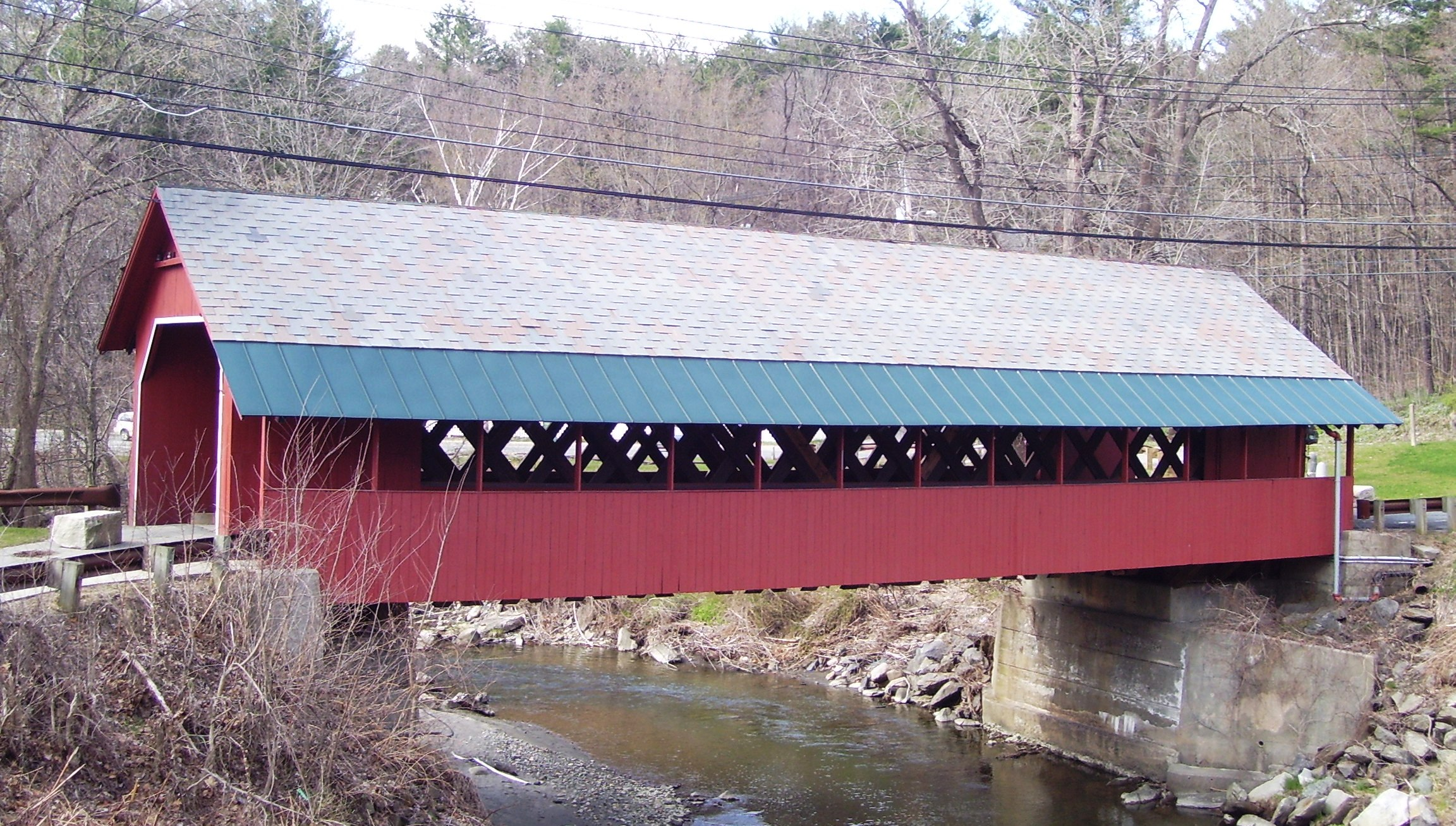

- Location within Vermont Location within the United States
- Nearest city: Brattleboro, Vermont
- Coordinates: 42°50′58″N 72°35′12″W
- Area: 1 acre (0.40 ha)
- Built: 1879
- Architectural style: Town lattice truss
- NRHP reference No.: 73000202
- Added to NRHP: August 28, 1973

The Creamery Covered Bridge is a historic covered bridge in West Brattleboro, Vermont. Now closed to traffic, the Town lattice truss bridge formerly carried Guilford Road across Whetstone Brook, just south of Vermont Route 9. Built in 1879, it is Brattleboro's last surviving 19th-century covered bridge.

== Description and history ==
The Creamery Covered Bridge is about 1.5 miles (2.4 km) west of downtown Brattleboro, just south of Vermont Route 9 and west (upstream) of the current alignment of Guilford Road, which it previously carried. The bridge is 80 feet (24 m) long and 19 feet (5.8 m) wide, and rests on stone abutments, one of which has been faced in concrete. The roadway is 15 feet (4.6 m) wide, and an attached sidewalk on the downstream side is 5.5 feet (1.7 m) wide. The bridge is topped by a roof that is slate over the roadway and metal over the sidewalk. The bridge trusses, built to the patented design of Ithiel Town, are protected by vertical board siding that rises about half their height, with a similar wall outside the sidewalk. Guy wires attached to the upstream side provide additional lateral support.

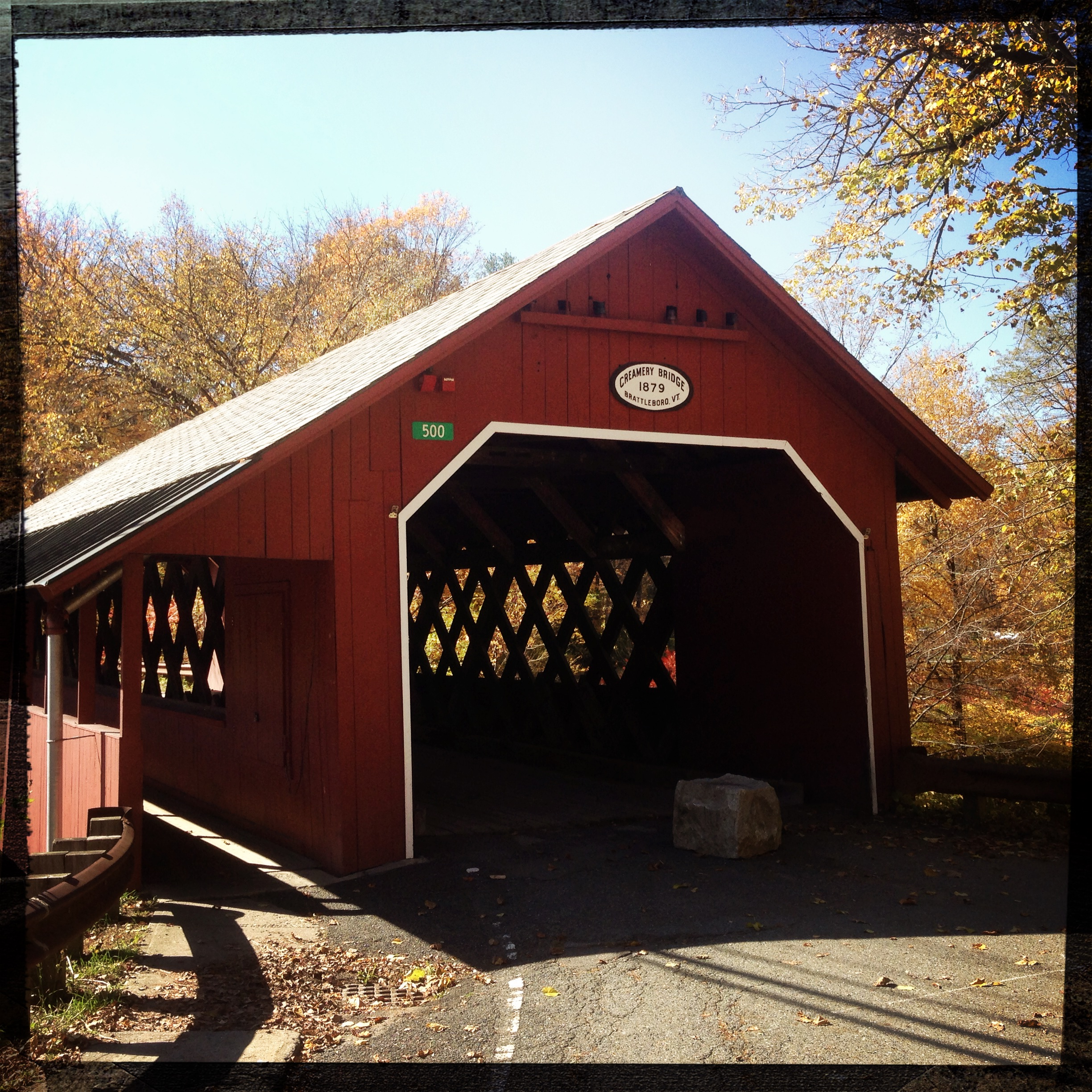
The Route 9 facing end of the bridge.

The bridge was built in 1879 out of spruce lumber, and the sidewalk was added about 1920. It is the last of what were once a large number of covered bridges in Brattleboro, and is the only covered bridge visible from Route 9 anywhere along its length, making it a significant tourist attraction. The bridge was closed to traffic in 2010.

== See also ==
- National Register of Historic Places listings in Windham County, Vermont
- List of bridges on the National Register of Historic Places in Vermont
- List of Vermont covered bridges
