= John Holbrook (publisher) =

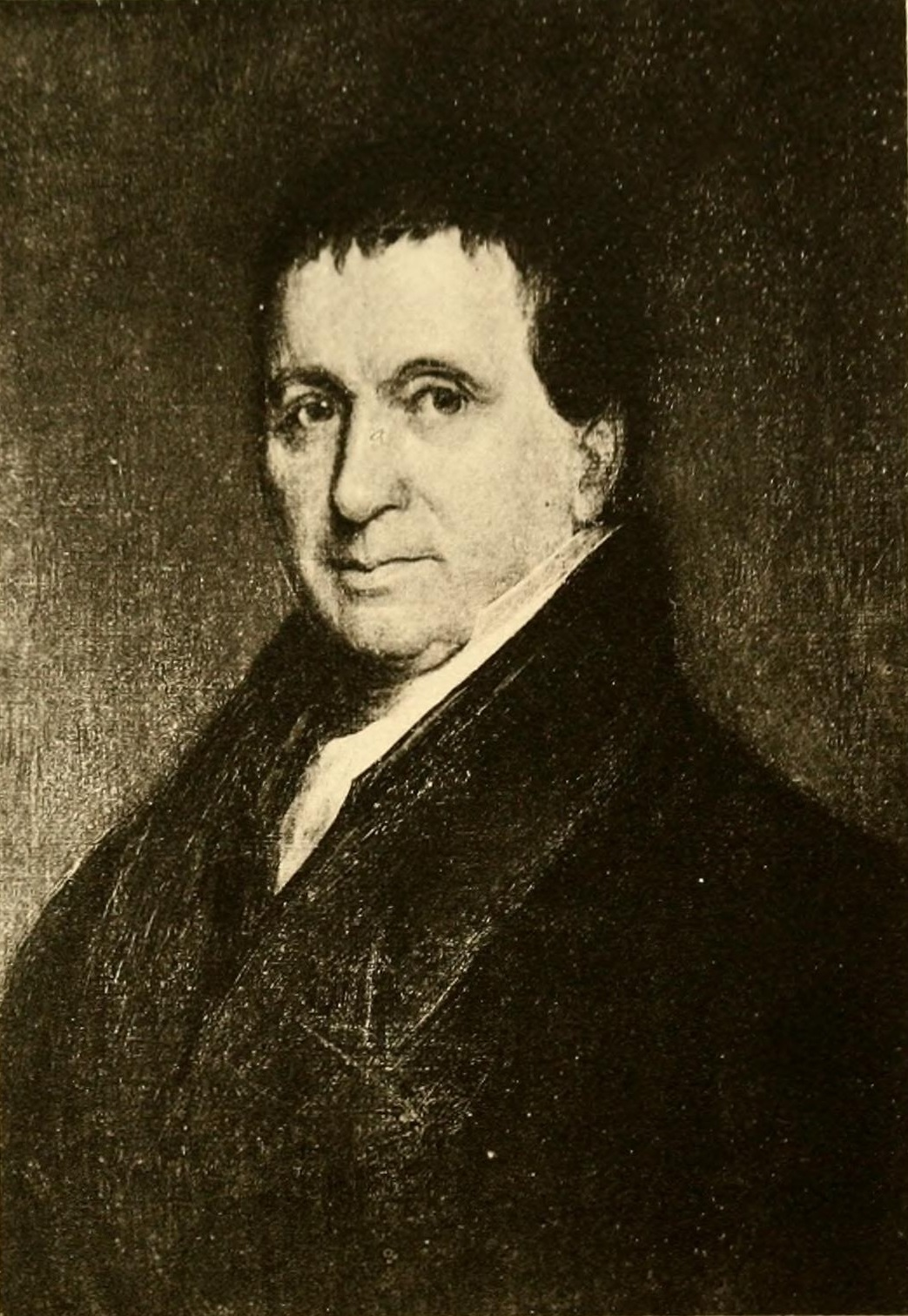
From Volume 1 of 1921's Annals of Brattleboro, 1781-1895

John Holbrook (July 10, 1761—April 6, 1838) was a publisher and entrepreneur. An early settler of Brattleboro, Vermont, Holbrook was notable for initiating a publishing industry there.

== Biography ==
Holbrook was born in Weymouth, Massachusetts on July 10, 1761. At the start of the American Revolution, Holbrook's father moved to Dorchester, Massachusetts. His family were British loyalists. British Army officers in the Dorchester area were impressed with Holbrook's desire for learning, and instructed him in surveying, map making, and engineering.

As a young man, Holbrook moved to Newfane, Vermont; a letter of introduction to Judge Luke Knowlton led to Holbrook's employment as a surveyor, and he laid out towns after they were granted by Vermont's government and then subdivided the individually owned lots.

While in Newfane he became a co-owner of a general store. After moving to Brattleboro, he took on a partner based in Hartford, Connecticut, and they operated stores in Hartford and Brattleboro. In 1797 he bought out his two business partners and went into the flatboat business, owning and operating the first and largest flatboats carrying goods from Hartford to Brattleboro. Holbrook was also involved in other business ventures, including a slaughter house, a paper mill, and a river boat freight hauling business.

In 1811, Holbrook sold his businesses and relocated to Warehouse Point, Connecticut; he returned to Brattleboro after the death of his son-in-law William Fessenden, the husband of his daughter Patty. Holbrook took over Fessenden's newly-established printing business and took on William's brother Joseph as a partner. Holbrook owned or started several publishing houses, including the Brattleboro Typographic Company. Holbrook's businesses began to publish editions of the Bible, and ultimately issued 42. A devoted member of Brattleboro's East Village Congregational Church, in 1816 Holbrook was appointed a deacon, and was frequently addressed by that title afterwards. The Holbrook Bibles were noted for their extensive illustrations and high quality paper, which made the type easier to read. The positive reputation Holbrook's Bibles developed was an effective marketing tool, and Holbrook's publishing businesses proved successful.

Holbrook served on the board of directors of the Phoenix Bank of Hartford, Connecticut, and was president of the Brattleboro Bank. He was an original board of trustees member for both Brattleboro's first high school and the Vermont Asylum for the Insane.

In 1825, Holbrook built the Deacon John Holbrook House, which is now on the National Register of Historic Places.

== Death and burial ==
John Holbrook died in Brattleboro on April 6, 1838, and was buried at Prospect Hill Cemetery in Brattleboro.

== Family ==
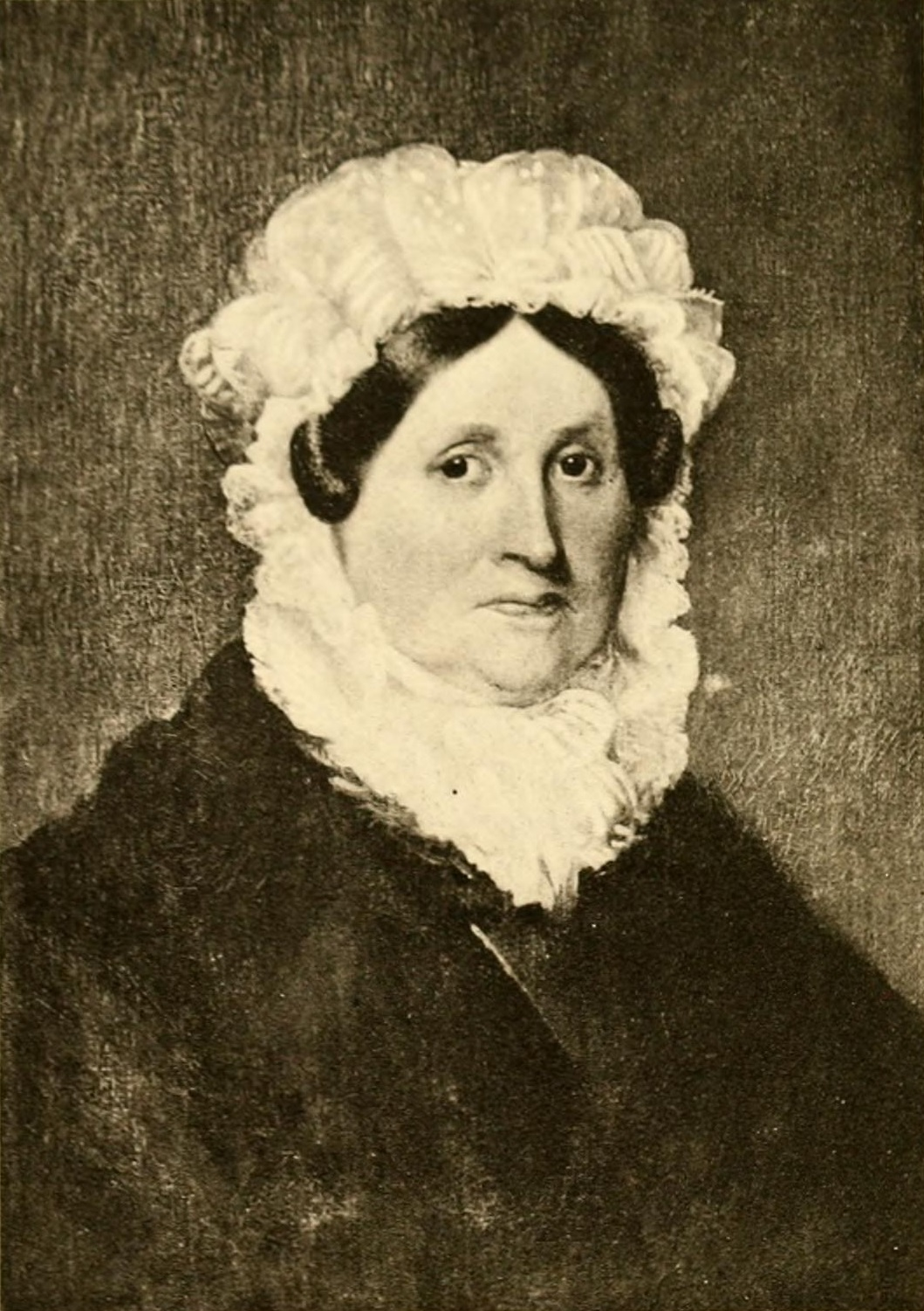
Sarah Knowlton Holbrook, from Volume 1 of 1921's Annals of Brattleboro, 1781-1895

In 1786, Holbrook married Sarah (or Sara) Knowlton, the daughter of Luke Knowlton. They lived in Newfane and Wardsboro before moving to Brattleboro in 1794. Their children included:

- Patty (1788-1870), the wife of William Fessenden
- Franklin (1792-1810)
- Sibbel (1794-1835), the wife of Joseph Fessenden
- Sarah (1796-1849), the wife of George W. Hall, and then Isaac Coale
- Sophia (1798-1841)
- Lucinda (1800-1843), the wife of Rudolphus Bennett Jr.
- Eliza (1804-1858)
- Rev. John Calvin (1808-1900)
- Frederick (1813-1909), who served as Governor of Vermont during the American Civil War
