= Vermont Jazz Center =

American music school

Coordinates: 42.8369°N 72.5536°W

The Vermont Jazz Center is a school for jazz founded by guitarist Attila Zoller in Brattleboro, Vermont. Zoller started the center as the Attila Zoller Jazz Clinics in 1974. The center was renamed Vermont Jazz Center when he incorporated the business. The center runs an annual summer workshop, lessons, and a concert series.

In 2014, the center received an Acclaim Award from Chamber Music America. In 2016, the center purchased a Steinway D-274.

The center does not rely on grant funding for much of its programming, generating funding from donors and other income.
