= Luke Knowlton =

American judge

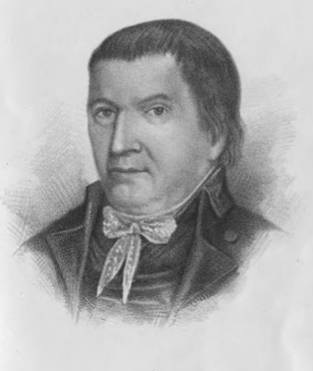
- From 1897's The History and Genealogy of the Knowltons of England and America

Associate Justice of the Vermont Supreme Court
- In office 1786-1786
- Preceded by: None (position created)
- Succeeded by: None (position eliminated)

Member of the Vermont Governor's Council
- In office October 17, 1789 – October 21, 1800
- Preceded by: Samuel Fletcher
- Succeeded by: Benjamin Burt

Chief Judge of the Windham County Court
- In office 1787–1793
- Preceded by: Samuel Knight
- Succeeded by: Samuel Knight
- In office 1802–1803
- Preceded by: Samuel Knight
- Succeeded by: Samuel Porter

Member of the Vermont House of Representatives
- In office 1784-1785
- Preceded by: William Ward
- Succeeded by: William Ward
- In office 1788-1789
- Preceded by: William Ward
- Succeeded by: Calvin Knowlton
- In office 1792
- Preceded by: Calvin Knowlton
- Succeeded by: Moses Kenny
- In office 1805-1806
- Preceded by: Ebenezer Allen
- Succeeded by: Elijah Elmer

Town Clerk of Newfane, Vermont
- In office 1774-1783
- Preceded by: None (position created)
- Succeeded by: Hezekiah Boyden
- In office 1784-1789
- Preceded by: Hezekiah Boyden
- Succeeded by: Calvin Knowlton

Personal details
- Born: November 4, 1738 Shrewsbury, Province of Massachusetts Bay
- Died: December 10, 1810 (aged 72) Newfane, Vermont
- Spouse(s): Sarah Holland (1740–1797), m. 1760
- Relations: John Holbrook (son in law); Frederick Holbrook (grandson); Paul Holland Knowlton (grandson); Willard Warner (great-grandson)
- Children: 7
- Profession: Politician, farmer, land speculator

Luke Knowlton (November 4, 1738 – December 12, 1810) was a political leader of colonial Vermont, the Vermont Republic, and the state of Vermont. He served as a justice of the Vermont Supreme Court, a member of the Governor's Council, and a member of the Vermont House of Representatives.

== Early life ==
Knowlton was born in Shrewsbury, Massachusetts on November 4, 1738, the son of Deacon Ezekiel Knowlton (1707–1774) and Susannah Morgan Knowlton (1708–1794). He was educated locally and became a farmer. Knowlton served in the French and Indian War as a private in a Massachusetts militia regiment, and performed duty at Fort Crown Point and Fort Ticonderoga in New York, and Fort Number 4 in New Hampshire.

== Move to Vermont ==
In 1772 his family relocated to Newfane, Vermont, a new settlement which at the time contained fewer than 20 families, and he was soon appointed a justice of the peace. He was chosen as Newfane's first town clerk when the town was organized in 1774, and he served from 1774 to 1783, and again from 1784 to 1789.

== American Revolution ==
Knowlton had been a Loyalist in the years leading up to the American Revolution, and had received from the British government a land grant in Sherbrooke, Quebec, but upon moving to Vermont he aligned himself with the Patriot cause. In 1782, the Continental Congress authorized the arrest of Knowlton and Samuel Wells of Brattleboro after they came under suspicion of communicating with the British government in Canada and New York City. Knowlton fled to Canada, but he returned to Newfane a year later.

During Vermont's early years, the colonial governments of New Hampshire and New York disputed jurisdiction over Vermont, including the right to sell land grants. Vermont formed its own government, which recognized land titles previously purchased from New Hampshire. After the Revolution, Vermont's independent government worked to obtain statehood, while New York attempted to exert control over Vermont. Knowlton was sent to the Congress of the Confederation as an emissary of Vermont residents (including Knowlton) who held New York land grants, but became a convert to the cause of Vermont statehood.

== Post-Revolution ==
In 1784, Knowlton was again accused of being sympathetic to the British in Canada, and southeastern Vermonters loyal to New York, led by Francis Prouty, took him from his home by force in the middle of the night, and released him in Massachusetts. He returned to Newfane just as a detachment of militia led by Stephen R. Bradley was preparing to pursue his abductors and free him. Prouty evaded capture for several months, and was eventually apprehended at his home. He was indicted for burglary, forcibly carrying Knowlton away from his home, and resisting arrest. He was acquitted of the first two charges, and received a fine and a 40-day jail sentence on the charge of resisting arrest.

As a condition of Vermont's entry into the Union in 1791, Vermont paid New York $30,000 (about $760,000 in 2018) to settle claims by holders of land grants purchased from New York, and Knowlton received approximately $250 (about $6,400 in 2018) as compensation for the New York title to his Newfane land.

Knowlton served in the Vermont House of Representatives in 1784, 1785, 1788, 1789, 1792, 1805, and 1806, and was a member of Vermont's Governor's Council from 1789 to 1800.

In 1786 Knowlton was appointed a justice of the Vermont Supreme Court, but his position was eliminated later that year when the size of the court was reduced. He served as Chief Judge of the Windham County Court from 1787 to 1793, and again from 1802 to 1803.

In 1786 Knowlton was one of the recipients of land grants and the charter for the town of Danville. In 1791 Knowlton received from Vermont's government a 10,000-acre land grant (Knowlton's Gore) in Franklin County as payment for his government service. He later sold this grant to Joseph Baker, who used it to found the town of Bakersfield.

== Death and burial ==
Knowlton continued to reside in Newfane until his death on December 12, 1810. He was buried at Newfane Hill Cemetery in Newfane.

== Family ==
In 1760 he married Sarah Holland (1740–1797), also of Shrewsbury, Massachusetts. They were the parents of three sons and four daughters.

Calvin Knowlton (1761–1800) graduated from Dartmouth College in 1783, studied law, was admitted to the bar, and practiced in Newfane.

Patty Knowlton (1762–1814) married Daniel Warner, and was the mother of Willard Warner (1797–1847), and the grandmother of Willard Warner, an officer in the Union Army during the American Civil War, and a United States senator from Alabama after the war.

Silas Knowlton (1764–1844) married Lucinda Holbrook in Newfane on November 30, 1786, and died in Canada. Silas and Lucinda Knowlton were the parents of Paul Holland Knowlton, a prominent Canadian businessman and political figure.

Sarah (or Sara) Knowlton was born on May 2, 1767. She married John Holbrook in Newfane on November 30, 1786. She died on March 22, 1851. They were the parents of Frederick Holbrook, who served as Governor of Vermont during the American Civil War.

Alice (born July 22, 1769) married Dr. Nathan Stone on April 24, 1788. She died in Newfane on November 14, 1865.

Lucinda was born on August 8, 1771, and married Samuel Willard. They lived in Sheldon, Vermont before moving to Canada. She died on May 4, 1800, and was buried at Sheldon Cemetery in Sheldon.

Luke Knowlton, Jr., was born in Newfane on March 24, 1775. He was a graduate of Dartmouth College who became an attorney and served as a member of the Vermont House of Representatives and Assistant Judge of Windham County. He later moved to Canada, where he died on September 17, 1855.

== Legacy ==
Knowlton Pond in the Brighton community of Island Pond was named for Luke Knowlton, who helped survey and lay out Brighton in the 1780s. Residents later renamed Knowlton Pond to Island Pond, the name by which it continues to be known.
