= 1861 Vermont gubernatorial election =

- September 3, 1861
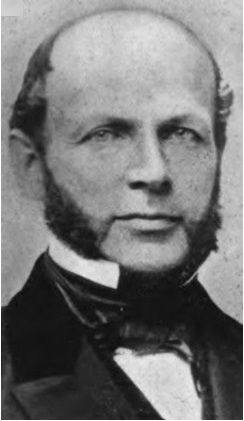

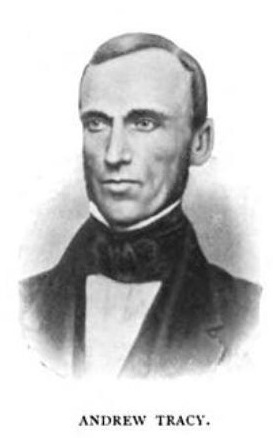
Nominee	Frederick Holbrook	Andrew Tracy	Benjamin H. Smalley
Party	Republican	War Democratic	Peace Democratic
Popular vote	33,152	5,722	3,190
Percentage	77.47%	13.37%	7.45%
- County results Holbrook: 60–70% 70–80% 80–90% >90%
Governor before election
Erastus Fairbanks
Republican
Elected Governor
Frederick Holbrook
Republican

The 1861 Vermont gubernatorial election for governor of Vermont was held on Tuesday, September 3. In keeping with the "Mountain Rule", incumbent Republican Erastus Fairbanks, who had also served as governor from 1852 to 1853, was not a candidate for a third one-year term. The Republican nominee was Frederick Holbrook, a former member of the Vermont Senate. With the Democratic Party split nationally over the response to the American Civil War, Andrew Tracy, a former member of the United States House of Representatives, was nominated by the People's Union Convention, which drew support from War Democrats and conservative Republicans. Benjamin H. Smalley ran as a Peace Democrat, representing Democrats who favored a compromise with the states that had formed the Confederacy.

Vermont continued to oppose slavery and support the Union, which was reflected in its support of Republican candidates. Holbrook easily defeated both Democrats and won a one-year term that began on October 15. Illness confined Holbrook at home for most of October, and he delayed traveling to Montpelier to take his oath of office until October 22.

== General election ==
=== Results ===
1861 Vermont gubernatorial election
Party	Candidate	Votes	%	±%
Republican	Frederick Holbrook	33,152	77.47	
War Democratic	Andrew Tracy	5,722	13.37	
Peace Democratic	Benjamin H. Smalley	3,190	7.45	
	Scattering	732	1.71	
Total votes		42,796	100.0	
