= 1862 Vermont gubernatorial election =

- September 2, 1862
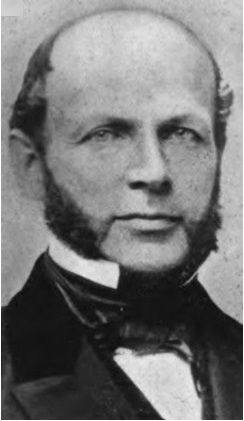
Nominee	Frederick Holbrook	Benjamin H. Smalley
Party	Republican	Democratic
Popular vote	29,543	3,772
Percentage	88.47%	11.30%
- County results Holbrook: 70–80% 80–90% >90%
Governor before election
Frederick Holbrook
Republican
Elected Governor
Frederick Holbrook
Republican

The 1862 Vermont gubernatorial election for governor of Vermont was held on Tuesday, September 2. In keeping with the "Mountain Rule", incumbent Republican Frederick Holbrook was a candidate for a second one-year term. The Democratic nominee was Benjamin H. Smalley, who had been on the ballot in 1861 as the gubernatorial candidate of the "Peace Democrats," who favored compromise with the Confederacy.

Vermont continued to strongly support the Union and the Republican Party. Holbrook was backed by Republicans and pro-Union Democrats, and easily defeated Smalley to win a one-year term that began on October 10.

== General election ==
=== Results ===
1862 Vermont gubernatorial election
Party	Candidate	Votes	%	±%
Republican	Frederick Holbrook (incumbent)	29,543	88.47	
Democratic	Benjamin H. Smalley	3,772	11.30	
	Scattering	77	0.23	
Total votes		33,392	100.0	
