= New England Center for Circus Arts =

Coordinates: 42.872496°N 72.556863°W

The New England Center for Circus Arts (NECCA) is a non-profit circus school based in Brattleboro, Vermont. NECCA is the premiere circus training school in the US offering a world class professional program for aspiring performers, along with workshops and recreational classes for youth and adult students of all ages, levels, and abilities.

Founded in 2007 and originally in the Old Cotton Mill, in Brattleboro, the school moved into a new custom-built facility at 10 Town Crier Dr in 2017, which includes an 8,600 square foot Trapezium. The new facility required a 2.5 million dollar capital campaign, and was designed by Turner Brooks Architects. The school had been growing continuously since its inception in 2007. The school was founded by identical twin aerialists Serenity Smith Forchion and Elsie Smith, whose personal performing company is Nimble Arts.

As of 2025 the school had more than 50 employees. It is the longest running professional circus arts training program in the United States.
