= Brooks House (Brattleboro, Vermont) =

- U.S. National Register of Historic Places
- U.S. Historic district – Contributing property
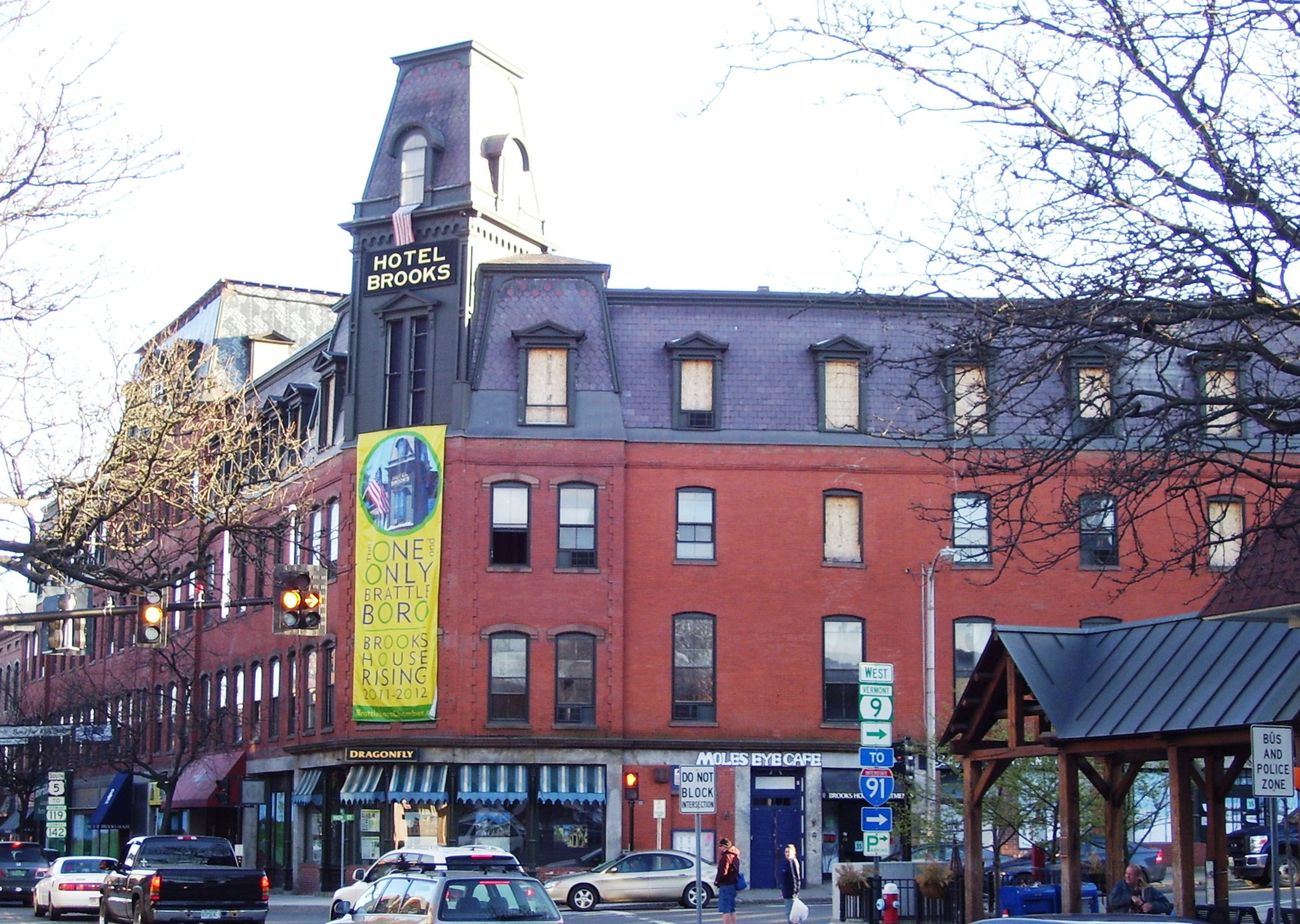
- (2012)

- Location within Vermont Location within the United States
- Location: 128 Main Street (4 High Street); Brattleboro, Vermont
- Coordinates: 42°51′11″N 72°33′31″W
- Built: 1871
- Architect: E. Boyden & Son
- Architectural style: provincial Second Empire
- Part of: Brattleboro Downtown Historic District (ID83003225)
- NRHP reference No.: 80000343

Significant dates
- Added to NRHP: February 1, 1980
- Designated CP: February 17, 1983

Brooks House, also known as the Hotel Brooks, is an historic building located at the corner of Main Street and High Street in downtown Brattleboro, Vermont. It was built in 1871 and designed by the architectural firm of E. Boyden & Son of Worcester, Massachusetts, in the provincial Second Empire style for George Brooks, to replace a previous hotel on the site which had burned down. When it was completed, the luxury hotel had 80 rooms which were lavishly furnished. It was added to the National Register of Historic Places in 1980.

== Description and history ==
The iron entrance and veranda along Main Street was 40 feet long and two stories high, and the cast-iron columns featured granite lintels, which supported the weight of the building, which was, and remains, the largest commercial structure in Brattleboro.

In its day, the hotel, one of the largest in New England and possibly the biggest Second Empire building outside of New York City, was a popular summer resort, well known in both New York and Boston. The veranda was used as a reviewing stand for parades, meetings were held in the hotel year-round, and the ballroom hosted lavish parties. The Second Empire style was widely used for hotels at the time, one of which, the Towsley House Hotel in Waterloo, New York, was extremely similar in design and layout to the Brooks House Hotel, raising the possibility that Boyden might have plagiarized it.

The interior of the building was significantly changed in 1970–72 to make it commercially viable and prevent the building from being demolished. The 50-foot x 50-foot ballroom, which originally occupied the second and third floors of the High Street side of the building and was clear of any columns, posts or other obstructions, was divided into office spaces, as was the remainder of those two floors, and the next three floors were turned into 59 modern apartments. The lobby of the building became a bank, and the original entrance replaced by a modern entrance. These alterations left no trace of the original interior. In addition, exterior columns were removed to allow larger windows for retail spaces on the ground floor.

On April 17, 2011, the third and fourth floors of the building were heavily damaged by a fire. The owner, Jonathan Chase, spent almost $2 million to restore and redevelop it, but was unable to raise the money necessary to complete the job, and on April 4, 2012, announced that he was selling the building, which Brattleboro Town Manager Barbara Sondag characterized as "vitally important to downtown", to a newly formed corporation consisting of local investors, which will seek the $14 million thought to be necessary to finish the 18- to 24-month project.

Mesabi LLC is a team of five local investors who are now undertaking the redevelopment of the Brooks House. On Tuesday, July 9, 2013, the group closed on the deal and will begin construction at the end of the month. The project is estimated to cost $24 million, and financing has come from a variety of sources, including Town of Brattleboro loans and federal tax credits. When completed the building will house a new downtown campus for Community College of Vermont and Vermont Technical College (Vermont Tech).

== See also ==
- National Register of Historic Places listings in Windham County, Vermont
