= Brattleboro Typographic Company =

The Brattleboro Typographic Company was a printing company in Brattleboro, Vermont founded on October 26, 1836, as a successor to the firm Holbrook & Fessenden. The company started with $150,000 in Capital and eight power printing presses. The company issued large editions of the bible alongside other nationally distributed publications. The company initiated what would become a very successful publishing industry in the town. Notably, the printing company was one of the few publishers at the time who manufactured their own paper for printing.
