= Whetstone Brook =

River in Windham County, Vermont, US

Coordinates: 42°51′06″N 72°33′24″W

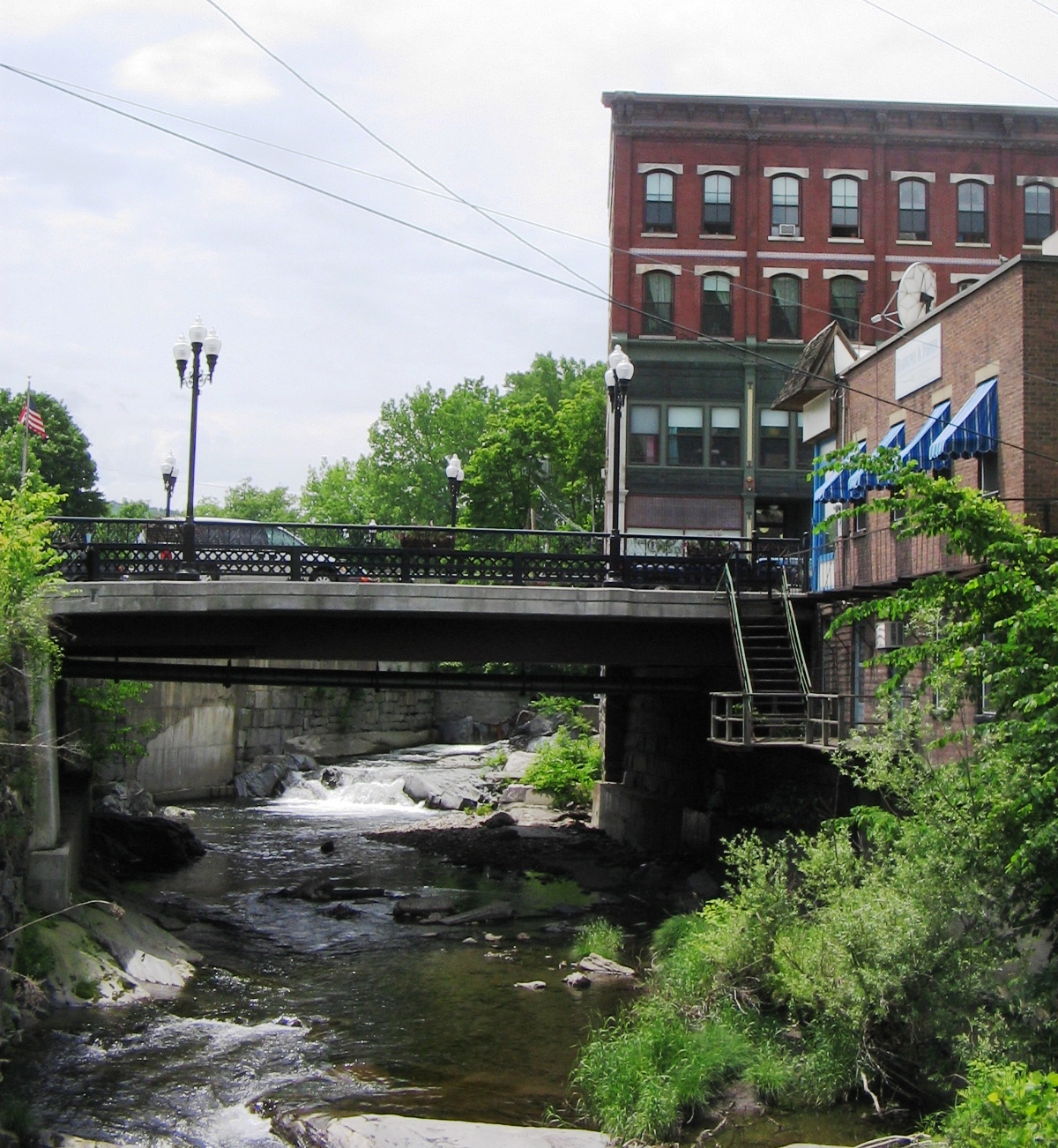
Whetstone Brook as it runs under the Main Street Bridge in downtown Brattleboro, VT

Whetstone Brook is a tributary of the Connecticut River that runs through the heart of Brattleboro, Vermont, in the United States. It flows into the Connecticut at an elevation of 250 feet (76 m) above sea level. The headwater for the brook is at Hidden Lake, which is 1,500 feet (460 m) above sea level in the town of Marlboro. Of the 28-square-mile (73 km^{2}) watershed, over two thirds is contained within Brattleboro, while another 30 percent is in Marlboro. The remaining 2% is within the town of Dummerston. The brook is crossed by Creamery Covered Bridge in West Brattleboro, which was built in 1879. The original Abenaki name for the waterway is Kitadowôganisibosis.

== History ==
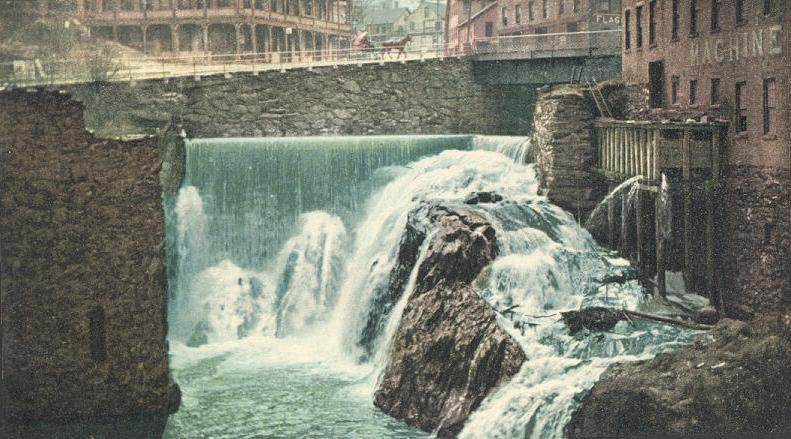
Whetstone Falls in 1907 near the connection with the Connecticut River. The falls and creek provided a supply of energy for mills in Brattleboro.

Whetstone Brook was an important part of the economic development of the town of Brattleboro, providing power for mills and factories along the shore of the brook. The first gristmill was established in the area by Governor Wentworth of New Hampshire in 1762, while the region was still under disputed claims between the colonies of New York and New Hampshire. By 1773, the road near Whetstone Brook contained several sawmills, as well as housing from new settlers to the area.

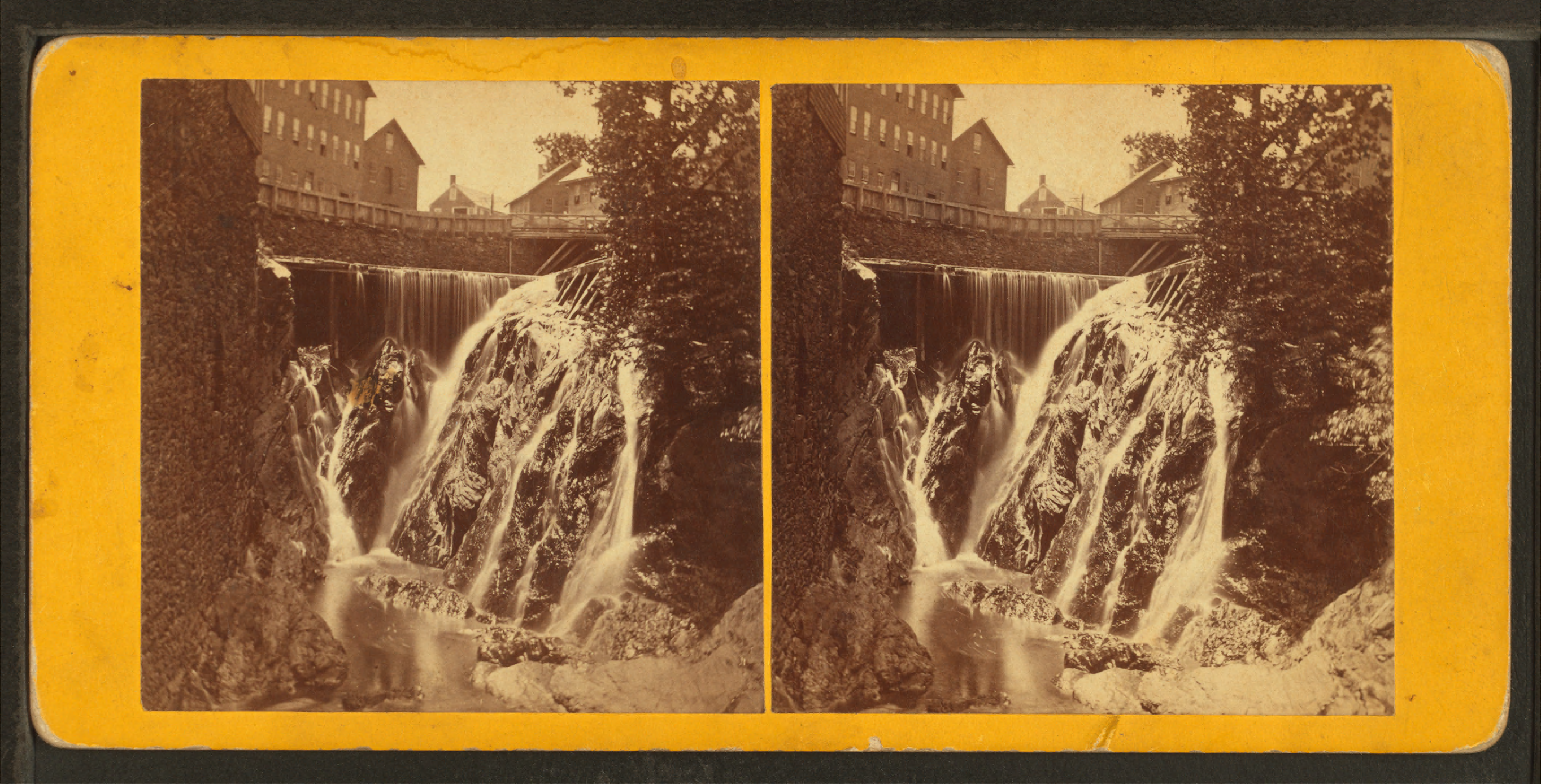
Whetstone Brook, Brattleboro, VT, circa 1869-1890

== Environmental issues ==
The Whetstone has a long history of contamination from the surrounding community of Brattleboro. In 1907, a local newspaper editorial described the brook becoming "an open sewer".

In 1990, the Vermont Department of Environmental Conservation identified oil leakage from an underground storage tank; the subsequent cleanup effort removed nearly 4,000 gallons of petroleum from the waterway and nearby soil, costing $440,000. The EPA uses the situation as a case study cleanup effort, for local-national cooperation in oil spill cleanup. As of 2007, the lower 2.5 miles (4.0 km) of the brook, along which there is significant development, is contaminated by E. coli and other bacteria. In 2011, a sewer interceptor pipe was ruptured during the landfall of Hurricane Irene, and nearly spilled sewage from the town of Brattleboro into the creek.

Whetstone looking northeast, from Bridge Street

== See also ==
- List of rivers of Vermont
