= West Brattleboro, Vermont =

Census-designated place in Vermont, United States

- Census-designated place
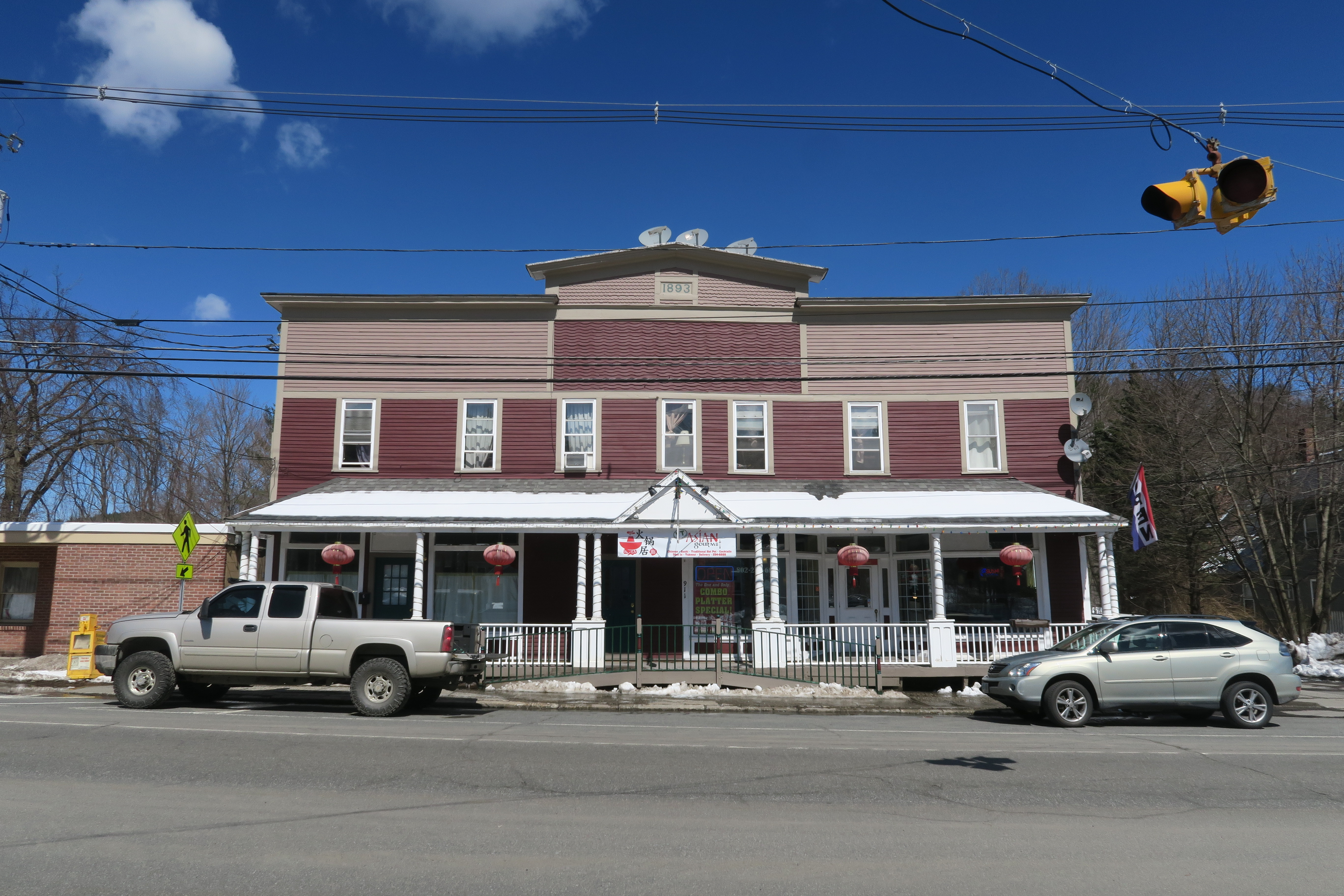
- 1893 Building

- Location within Vermont Location within the United States
- Coordinates: 42°51′58″N 72°36′50″W
- Country: United States
- State: Vermont
- County: Windham

Area
  - Total: 10.0 sq mi (25.9 km^{2})
  - Land: 10.0 sq mi (25.8 km^{2})
  - Water: 0.039 sq mi (0.1 km^{2})
- Elevation: 476 ft (145 m)

Population (2020)
  - Total: 2,803
  - Density: 320/sq mi (125/km^{2})
- Time zone: UTC-5 (Eastern (EST))
  - Summer (DST): UTC-4 (EDT)
- ZIP code: 05301
- Area code: 802
- FIPS code: 50-78850
- GNIS feature ID: 2378137

West Brattleboro is a census-designated place (CDP) in the town of Brattleboro, Vermont, United States. As of the 2020 census, West Brattleboro had a population of 2,803.

== Geography ==
According to the United States Census Bureau, the CDP has a total area of 25.9 km^{2} (10.0 sq mi), of which 25.8 km^{2} (10.0 sq mi) is land and 0.1 km^{2} (0.039 sq mi) (0.40%) is water.

== Demographics ==
As of the census of 2000, there were 3,222 people, 1,433 households, and 849 families residing in the CDP. The population density was 125.0 people /km^{2} (324 people/mi^{2}). There were 1,500 housing units at an average density of 58.2 units /km^{2} (151 units/mi^{2}). The racial makeup of the CDP was 96.28% White, 0.74% African American, 0.25% Native American, 0.93% Asian, 0.09% Pacific Islander, 0.47% from other races, and 1.24% from two or more races. Hispanic or Latino of any race were 1.43% of the population.

There were 1,433 households, out of which 28.8% had children under the age of 18 living with them, 46.1% were married couples living together, 10.5% had a female householder with no husband present, and 40.7% were non-families. 33.6% of all households were made up of individuals, and 15.3% had someone living alone who was 65 years of age or older. The average household size was 2.23 and the average family size was 2.87.

In the CDP, the population was spread out, with 23.0% under the age of 18, 5.8% from 18 to 24, 26.0% from 25 to 44, 28.4% from 45 to 64, and 16.9% who were 65 years of age or older. The median age was 42 years. For every 100 females, there were 80.9 males. For every 100 females age 18 and over, there were 78.9 males.

The median income for a household in the CDP was $35,332, and the median income for a family was $46,827. Males had a median income of $31,391 versus $22,114 for females. The per capita income for the CDP was $18,996. About 6.3% of families and 9.2% of the population were below the poverty line, including 11.0% of those under age 18 and 12.1% of those age 65 or over.
