= Andrew Tracy =

American politician, teacher and lawyer from Vermont (1797–1868)

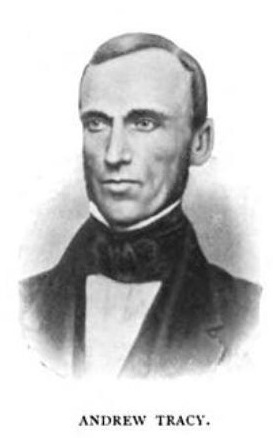

Member of the United States House of Representatives from Vermont's 2nd district
- In office March 4, 1853 – March 3, 1855
- Preceded by: William Hebard
- Succeeded by: Justin Smith Morrill

Member of the Vermont House of Representatives
- In office 1833–1837

Personal details
- Born: December 15, 1797 Hartford, Vermont, U.S.
- Died: October 28, 1868 (aged 70) Woodstock, Vermont, U.S.
- Resting place: River Street Cemetery in Woodstock
- Party: Whig Party
- Education: Dartmouth College
- Profession: Politician, Teacher, Lawyer

Andrew Tracy (December 15, 1797 – October 28, 1868) was an American politician, teacher and lawyer. He served as a U.S. representative from Vermont for one term from 1853 to 1855.

== Early life ==
Tracy was born in Hartford, Vermont, to James Tracy and Mercy Richmond Tracy. He attended Royalton and Randolph Academies, before attending Dartmouth College in Hanover, New Hampshire, for two years. He taught school, studied law with George E. Wales, and was admitted to the bar in 1826. He began the practice of law in Quechee, Vermont, and in 1838 moved to Woodstock, Vermont, where he continued to practice law.

== Political career ==
Tracy was member of the Vermont House of Representatives from 1833 until 1837. He served in the Vermont Senate in 1839 and was an unsuccessful candidate for election in 1840 to the Twenty-seventh Congress. He was a member of the Vermont House again from 1843 until 1845, and served as speaker. He was a Presidential Elector for Vermont in 1848.

He was elected as a Whig candidate to the Thirty-third Congress, serving from March 4, 1853, until March 3, 1855. He declined to be a candidate for renomination in 1854 to the Thirty-fourth Congress. After leaving Congress, he resumed the practice of law.

== Death ==
Tracy died in Woodstock, Vermont, on October 28, 1868.

Party political offices
First	Union nominee for Governor of Vermont; 1861	Succeeded by None
Political offices
Preceded by Carlos Coolidge	Speaker of the Vermont House of Representatives; 1842–1845	Succeeded by Ebenezer N. Briggs
U.S. House of Representatives
Preceded by William Hebard	Member of the U.S. House of Representatives from Vermont's 2nd congressional district 1853-1855	Succeeded by Justin S. Morrill
