= Brattleboro, Vermont =

Municipality in Vermont, United States

- Town
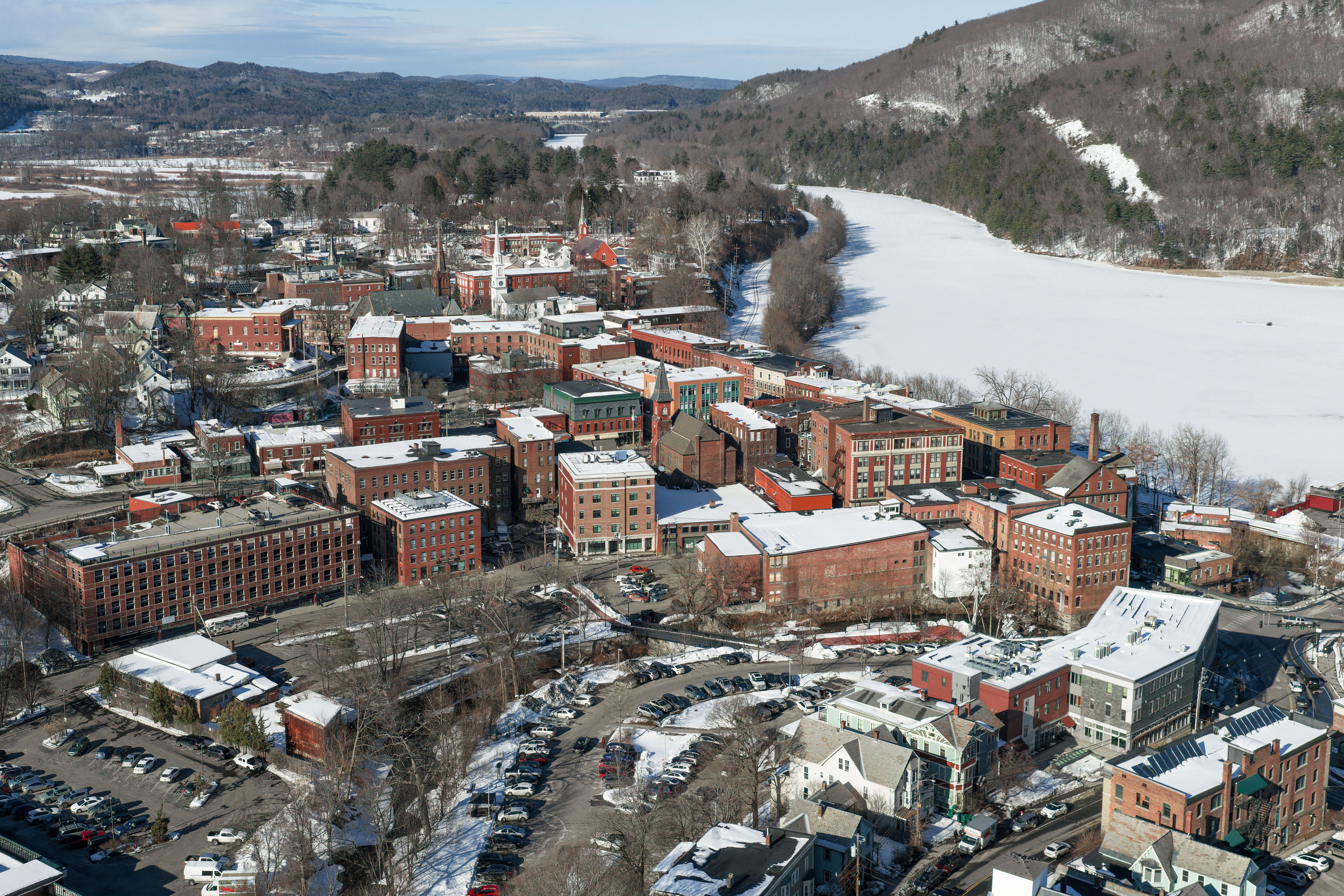
- Downtown

- Seal
- Motto: The One and Only Brattleboro
- Location Brattleboro (the United States)
- Coordinates: 42°52′15″N 72°36′52″W
- Country: United States
- State: Vermont
- County: Windham
- Chartered: 1753
- Communities: Brattleboro; West Brattleboro

Government
  - Type: Open town meeting

Area
  - Total: 32.4 sq mi (84.0 km^{2})
  - Land: 32.0 sq mi (82.9 km^{2})
  - Water: 0.46 sq mi (1.2 km^{2})
- Elevation: 577 ft (176 m)

Population (2020)
  - Total: 12,184
  - Density: 381/sq mi (147/km^{2})
- Time zone: UTC−5 (Eastern (EST))
  - Summer (DST): UTC−4 (EDT)
- ZIP Codes: 05301–05304
- Area code: 802
- FIPS code: 50-07900
- GNIS feature ID: 1462049
- Website: brattleboro.gov

Brattleboro (/ˈbrætəlbʌroʊ/), originally Brattleborough, is a town in Windham County, Vermont, United States, located about 10 miles (16 km) north of the Massachusetts state line at the confluence of Vermont's West River and the Connecticut River. With a 2022 Census population of 12,106, it is the most populous municipality abutting Vermont's eastern border with New Hampshire, which is the Connecticut River.

The town has been important to the history of Vermont, acting as a gateway for trade on both the Connecticut River and subsequent road and train infrastructure. Moreover, the Whetstone Brook allowed the development of several mill industries that relied on water power. The town rose to national and international recognition because of several major industries in the town during the 19th century: several bookbinding companies, including Brattleboro Typographic Company which produced bibles, and Estey Organ, one of the largest manufacturers of pipe organs in the world. As both industries shrank in the early 20th century, the town came to rely more on its role as an economic hub for more rural communities and Vermont's tourism industry.

There are satellite campuses of two colleges in Brattleboro: Community College of Vermont, and Vermont Technical College. Located in Brattleboro are the New England Center for Circus Arts, Vermont Jazz Center, and the Brattleboro Retreat, a mental health and addictions hospital. Notable annual events include Strolling of the Heifers and the Brattleboro Literary Festival.

== History ==
=== Indigenous people ===
The location was called Wantastegok or "Wantastiquet" by the indigenous Sokoki band of Abenaki that resided in the area before settlement by Europeans.

=== Frontier fort ===
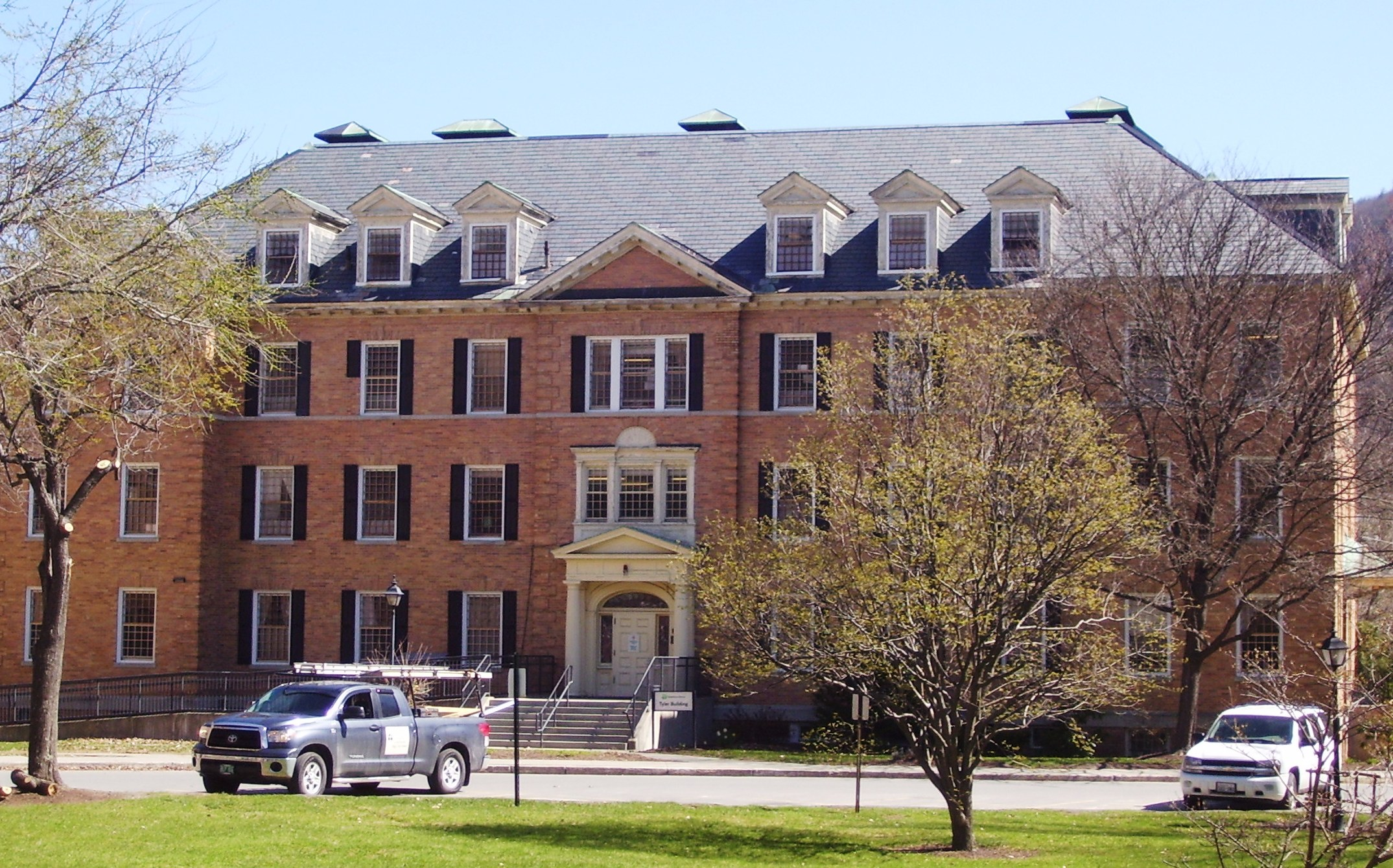
Brattleboro Retreat treats mental health disorders and drug addiction; established as Vermont Asylum for the Insane in 1834

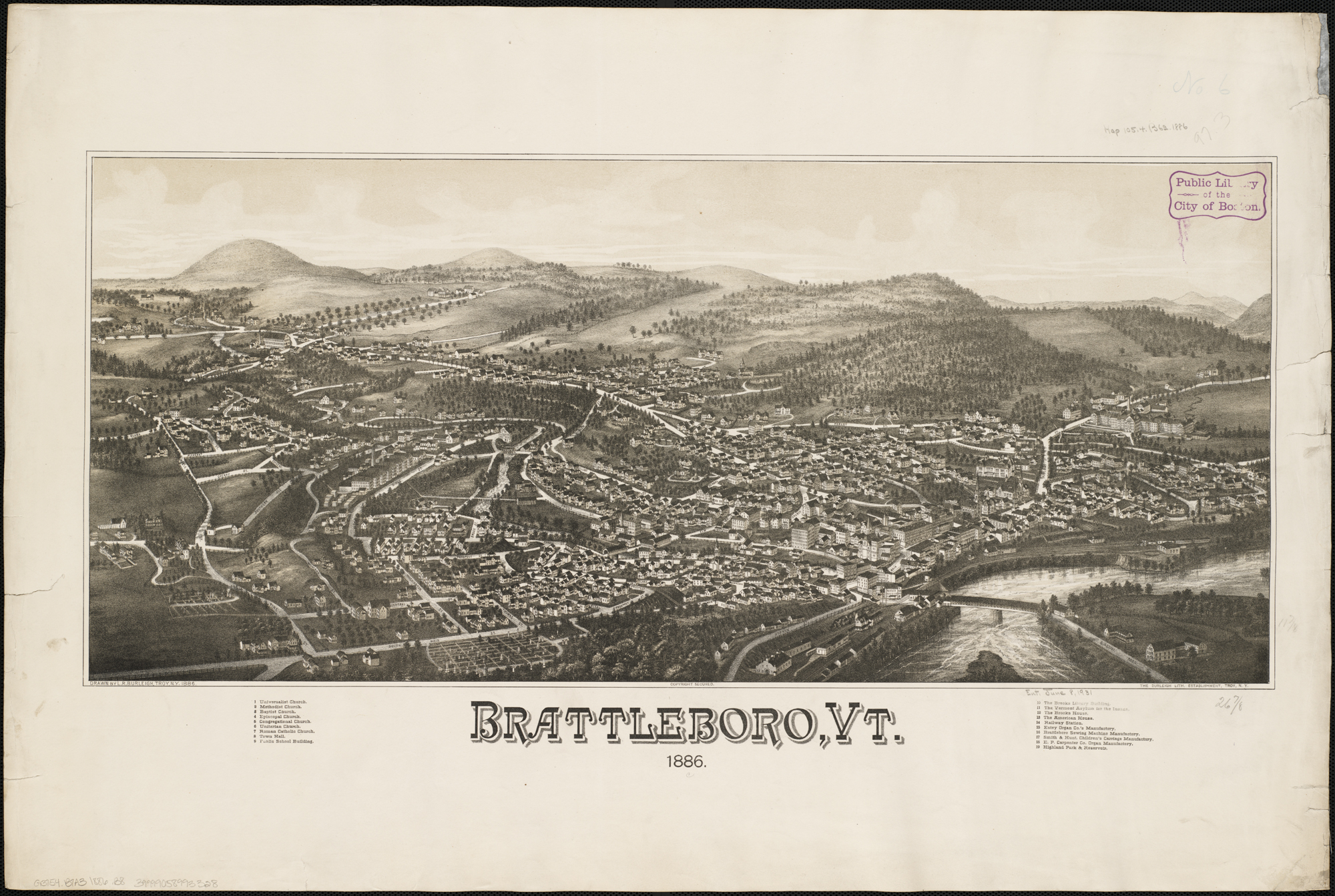
Lithograph of Brattleboro from 1886 by L.R. Burleigh with a list of landmarks

To defend the Massachusetts Bay Colony against Chief Gray Lock and others during Dummer's War, the Massachusetts General Court voted on December 27, 1723, to build a blockhouse and stockade on the Connecticut River near the site of what would later become known as Brattleboro. Lieutenant-governor William Dummer signed the measure, and construction of Fort Dummer began on February 3, 1724. It was completed before summer. On October 11 of that year, the French attacked the fort and killed some soldiers. In 1725, Dummer's War ended.

By 1728, and in subsequent peaceful periods, the fort served as a trading post for commerce among the colonial settlers and the Indians. But violence flared up from time to time throughout the first half of the 18th century. In 1744, what became known as King George's War broke out, lasting until 1748. During this period a small body of British colonial troops were posted at the fort, but after 1750 this was considered unnecessary.

Although the area was originally part of the Equivalent Lands, the township became one of the New Hampshire grants, and was chartered (founded) as such on December 26, 1753, by Governor Benning Wentworth. It was named Brattleborough, after Brigadier-General William Brattle, Jr. of Boston, a military officer, cleric, slaveholder as well as a principal proprietor. Ironically, there is no record that Brattle ever visited the locality, and settlement activities remained tentative until after the 1763 Treaty of Paris, when France abandoned their claims to Vermont, part of the region which they had called New France.

Hostilities having ceased, Brattleboro developed quickly in peacetime, and soon was second to no other settlement in the state for business and wealth. In 1771, Stephen Greenleaf opened Vermont's first store in the east village, and in 1784, a post office was established. A bridge was built across the Connecticut River to Hinsdale, New Hampshire, in 1804.

In 1834, the Brattleboro Retreat, then called the Vermont Asylum for the Insane, was established through a generous bequest by Anna Marsh of Hinsdale, New Hampshire. In 1844, the Brattleboro Hydropathic Establishment was opened by Robert Wesselhoeft; this was the third "water cure" establishment in the country, utilizing waters from a spring near the current downtown fire station. Until the water cure closed in 1871, the town was widely known as a curative health resort.

Other industries began to appear in the town under the initiation of the businessman John Holbrook, who initiated firms like the Brattleboro Typographic Company. These businesses initiated a decade of very successful printing industry in the town.

=== Mill town ===
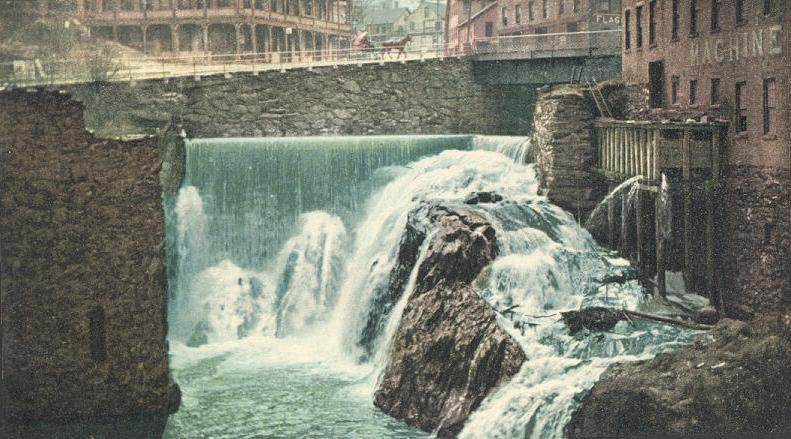
Whetstone Falls near the intersection of Whetstone Brook and Connecticut River, 1907

Whetstone Falls, very close to where Brattleboro's Whetstone Brook flows into the Connecticut River, was a handy source of water power for watermills, initially a sawmill and a gristmill. By 1859, when the population had reached 3,816, Brattleboro had a woolen textile mill, a paper mill, a manufacturer of papermaking machinery, a factory making melodeons, two machine shops, a flour mill, a carriage factory, and four printing establishments. Connected by the Vermont & Massachusetts Railroad and the Vermont Valley Railroad, the town prospered as a regional center for trade in commodities including grain, lumber, turpentine, tallow and pork. In 1888, the spelling of the town's name was shortened to Brattleboro.

The Estey Organ company, the largest organ manufacturer in the United States, operated in Brattleboro for about a century beginning in 1852. The company's main factory was located southwest of downtown Brattleboro, on the south side of Whetstone Brook between Birge and Organ Streets. At its height, the complex had more than 20 buildings, many of which were interconnected by raised walkways and covered bridges. One of the buildings now houses the Estey Organ Museum. The entire surviving complex was listed on the National Register of Historic Places in 1980, both for its architecture, and for having been a major economic force in Brattleboro for many years.

In 1871, Thomas P. James, "The Spirit Pen of Dickens", a printer by trade, moved to Brattleboro, where he took a job at The Vermont Farmer and Record. James claimed that the departed spirit of Charles Dickens had given him a communication at a seance on Oak Street. According to James, Dickens' spirit conveyed that he had chosen James to write down the end of "The Mystery of Edwin Drood", which Dickens had not completed before he died. Dickens' spirit also supposedly told James that it was fine if James made a profit from the book. The book was printed by the same company that owned the Springfield Union, which was the paper that published the first news about James' claims, as well as excerpts from the new chapters of the novel. Newspaper editors from papers around New England who had employed James denounced the entire affair as a well-planned advertising hoax. The book became a sensation, being reviewed in the New York Times and widely promoted in spiritualist magazines of the day. James published the novel on October 31, 1873, and reported that he sold 30,000 copies of it. James left Brattleboro in 1879, abandoning his third wife, and moving to Watertown, Massachusetts, with his fourth wife Lizzie Plummer, a member of the wealthy Salisbury family with ties to Brattleboro's printing and paper making industries.

British author Rudyard Kipling settled in Brattleboro after marrying a young Brattleboro woman, Carrie Balestier, in 1892. The couple built a home called Naulakha, just over the town line to the north in neighboring Dummerston. Kipling wrote The Jungle Book and other works there. He also wrote about local life in the early 1890s: heavy snowfalls, ox-teams drawing sledges, and people in the small towns beset with what he called a "terrifying intimacy" about each other's lives. He recorded the death of men who had left, going to seek their fortunes in the cities or out west, and the consequent loneliness and depression in the lives of local women; the long length of the workday for farmers, even in winter, often for lack of help; and the abandonment of farms.

The first person to receive a U.S. Social Security benefit check, issued on January 31, 1940, was Ida May Fuller from Brattleboro.

On May 12, 1950, auctioneer Emma Bailey held her first auction in Brattleboro, selling a rocking chair for $2.50. She was the first American woman auctioneer, and later became the first woman admitted to the National Auctioneers Association.

== Geography ==
According to the United States Census Bureau, the town has a total area of 32.5 square miles (84.0 km^{2}), of which 32.0 square miles (82.9 km^{2}) is land and 0.5 square mile (1.2 km^{2}, 1.42%) is water. Brattleboro is drained by the West River, Ames Hill Brook and Whetstone Brook. The town is in the Connecticut River Valley, and its eastern boundary (and the Vermont state line) is the western bank of the Connecticut River. Hills and mountains surround the town.

=== Climate ===
Brattleboro experiences a humid continental climate (Köppen Dfa) with cold, snowy winters and hot, humid summers. The town can experience snowfall as early as November and as late as April, and in the adjacent mountains and high country as late as May. Nor'easters often come with the potential of dumping a foot or more of snow on Brattleboro when they move through; such storms are not uncommon during the winter months. Summers are warm to hot and generally humid, with abundant sunshine and heavy showers and thunderstorms associated with passing cold fronts. Tornadoes are rare.

The record high is 100 °F (38 °C), set in 1955, and the record low is −33 °F (−36 °C), set in 1958. In terms of average annual precipitation, May is typically the wettest month, and February is the driest. Brattleboro averages 92.58 inches (235 cm) of snow annually.

Brattleboro lies in USDA plant hardiness zone 5a.

Climate data for Brattleboro, Vermont
Month	Jan	Feb	Mar	Apr	May	Jun	Jul	Aug	Sep	Oct	Nov	Dec	Year
Record high °F (°C)	62 (17)	65 (18)	83 (28)	97 (36)	95 (35)	100 (38)	99 (37)	100 (38)	100 (38)	91 (33)	78 (26)	68 (20)	100 (38)
Mean daily maximum °F (°C)	32 (0)	36 (2)	45 (7)	57 (14)	70 (21)	79 (26)	84 (29)	82 (28)	73 (23)	62 (17)	49 (9)	36 (2)	59 (15)
Mean daily minimum °F (°C)	11 (−12)	13 (−11)	24 (−4)	34 (1)	45 (7)	54 (12)	59 (15)	57 (14)	49 (9)	37 (3)	29 (−2)	18 (−8)	36 (2)
Record low °F (°C)	−30 (−34)	−33 (−36)	−19 (−28)	5 (−15)	22 (−6)	31 (−1)	39 (4)	36 (2)	24 (−4)	10 (−12)	−16 (−27)	−24 (−31)	−33 (−36)
Average precipitation inches (mm)	3.92 (100)	3.15 (80)	3.94 (100)	3.97 (101)	4.32 (110)	4.07 (103)	3.87 (98)	4.20 (107)	3.78 (96)	4.03 (102)	4.13 (105)	3.69 (94)	47.07 (1,196)
Source: The Weather Channel

== Demographics ==
Historical population
Census	Pop.	Note	%±
1790	1,589		—
1800	1,867		17.5%
1810	1,891		1.3%
1820	2,017		6.7%
1830	2,141		6.1%
1840	2,623		22.5%
1850	3,816		45.5%
1860	3,855		1.0%
1870	4,933		28.0%
1880	5,880		19.2%
1890	6,862		16.7%
1900	6,640		−3.2%
1910	7,541		13.6%
1920	8,332		10.5%
1930	9,816		17.8%
1940	10,983		11.9%
1950	11,522		4.9%
1960	11,734		1.8%
1970	12,239		4.3%
1980	11,886		−2.9%
1990	12,241		3.0%
2000	12,005		−1.9%
2010	12,046		0.3%
2020	12,184		1.1%
U.S. Decennial Census

As of the census of 2010, there were 12,046 people, 5,364 households, and 2,880 families residing in the town. Almost all of the population is concentrated in two census-designated places identified in the town: Brattleboro and West Brattleboro. The results of recent censuses indicate very little change in the overall number of people living in the town. Despite this, Brattleboro remains the most populous town along Vermont's eastern border.

The population density of the town was 375.3 people per square mile (144.9/km^{2}). There were 5,686 housing units at an average density of 177.7 per square mile (68.6/km^{2}). The racial makeup of the town was 92.1% White, 1.9% Black or African American, 0.3% Native American, 2.2% Asian, 0.04% Pacific Islander, 0.6% from other races, and 2.8% from two or more races. Hispanic or Latino of any race were 2.7% of the population.

There were 5,364 households, out of which 27.2% had children under the age of 18 living with them, 37.8% were married couples living together, 12.8% had a female householder with no husband present, and 46.3% were non-families. 37.8% of all households were made up of individuals, and 13.3% had someone living alone who was 65 years of age or older. The average household size was 2.15 and the average family size was 2.84.

In the town, the population was spread out, with 22.3% under the age of 18, 6.6% from 18 to 24, 29.2% from 25 to 44, 25.3% from 45 to 64, and 16.6% who were 65 years of age or older. The median age was 40 years. For every 100 females, there were 84.0 males. For every 100 females age 18 and over, there were 79.9 males.

The median income for a household in the town was $31,997, and the median income for a family was $44,267. Males had a median income of $31,001 versus $25,329 for females. The per capita income for the town was $19,554. About 9.2% of families and 13.1% of the population were below the poverty line, including 18.0% of those under age 18 and 9.2% of those age 65 or over.

== Economy ==
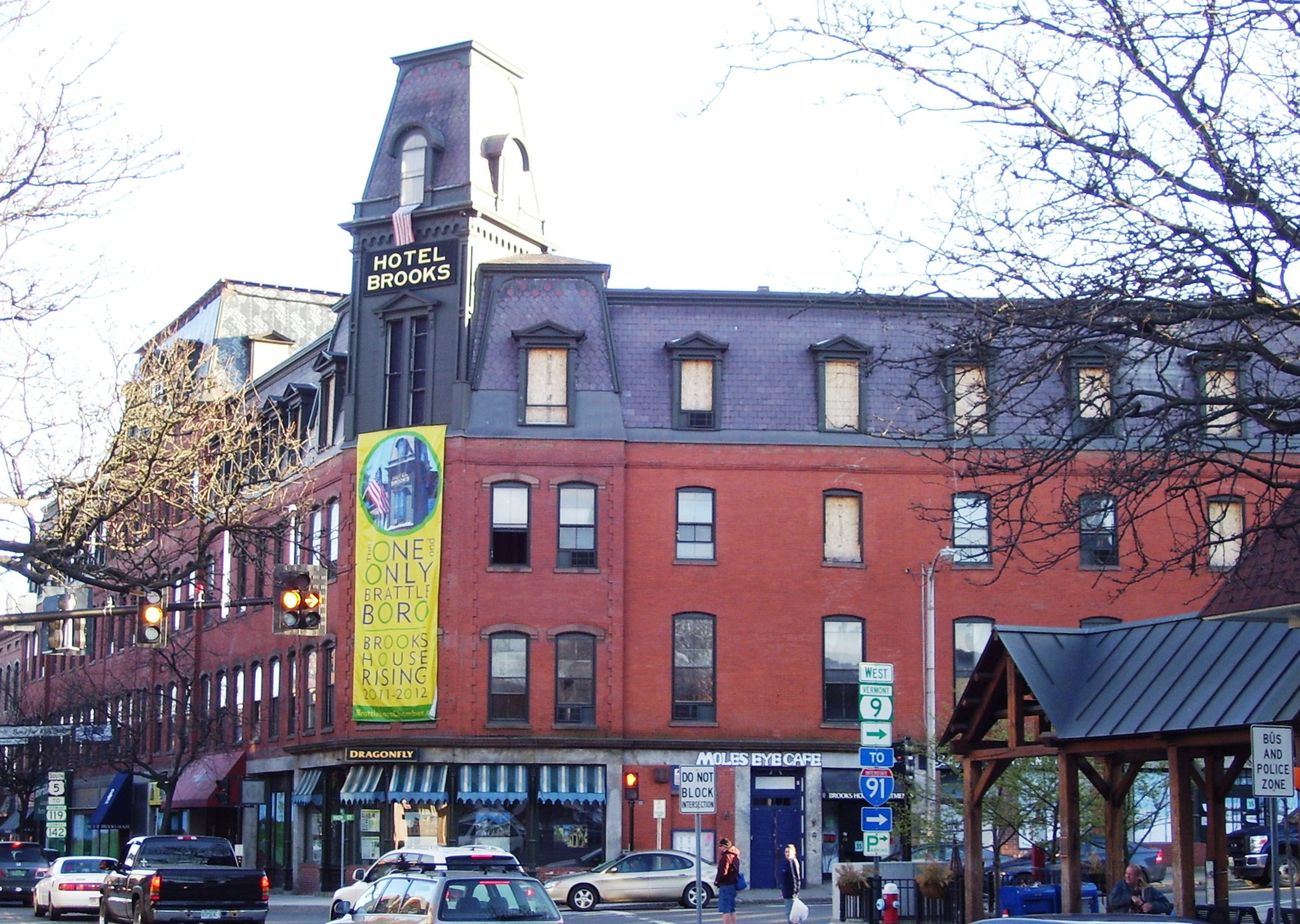
Brooks House, built in 1871 and originally a resort hotel, is the largest commercial building in Brattleboro.

Both a commercial and touristic gateway for the state of Vermont, Brattleboro is the first major town one encounters crossing northward by automobile from Massachusetts on Interstate 91, and is accessed via Vermont exits 1, 2, and 3 from that thoroughfare. It offers a mix of a rural atmosphere and urban amenities including a number of lodging establishments. Brattleboro also hosts art galleries, stores, and performance spaces, mostly located in the downtown area.

The majority of jobs based in Brattleboro are in the Health Care and Social Assistance sector, followed by Manufacturing, Government, and Retail Trade.

In 2007, after meeting qualifying criteria, the local Selectboard passed a resolution designating Brattleboro a Fair Trade Town, becoming the second Fair Trade certified town in the nation after Media, Pennsylvania.

C&S Wholesale Grocers, the northeast's largest regional food distributor, made its headquarters here until 2005, when they moved their administrative offices to Keene, New Hampshire; however, because of close proximity to Interstate 91, C&S still operates a large shipping and warehouse facility in Brattleboro near I-91's Exit 3.

Ehrmann Commonwealth Dairy is headquartered in Brattleboro and operates a dairy processing facility in the town that opened in 2011.

New Chapter, an organic vitamin and supplement maker is headquartered in Brattleboro.

Largest employers in Brattleboro (2011)
Employer	Employees	Industry
C&S Wholesale Grocers	1,200	Grocery wholesale, distribution
Brattleboro Memorial Hospital	400	Healthcare
Brattleboro Retreat	400	Healthcare
Retreat Healthcare	400	Healthcare

=== Development ===
The town's densely populated center is located near Vermont's lowest elevation point in the Connecticut river valley. Because of the surrounding steep hills there is very little flat land, and many of its buildings and houses are situated on steep hillsides, necessarily closely bunched together. This concentrated topography and population density have helped to create a semi-urban, cosmopolitan atmosphere in the downtown.

Since the 1950s, additional construction and development have expanded outside the concentrated downtown area; in the west, south, and north of the township. The southeast quarter of the town, near to and abutting the riverbank, is where its population has historically been the densest, and is composed largely of one- or two-family houses, with apartment buildings such as "triple deckers" interspersed among them. Commercial and industrial operations are concentrated along the north–south Canal Street (Route 5) artery. The town's high school and the Regional Career Center are also located in this section, as is Fort Dummer State Park, which is named after the first European settlers' 1724 stockade. The original Fort's site, however, was flooded in the early 20th century by a flood-control and hydro-electric dam built just downstream in Vernon, Vermont. An historical marker is located near the Fort's now-underwater site, on the west bank of the Connecticut River on Vernon Road (VT Route 142), at the corner of Cotton Mill Hill.

The western section of town, built up around Vermont's east–west Route 9, was formally designated a village in 2005. It is mostly lower-density residential in character, and features the state's largest mobile home park and several planned housing developments and subdivisions. Away from the Route 9 conduit, other parts of western Brattleboro and some areas north of the West River have a decidedly rural character, with dirt roads, sparse housing, wooded Green Mountains foothills, and the last few farms left in the town following the 1970s' decline of the dairy industry. At its peak, the immediate Brattleboro area had over 170 farms; there are now less than a dozen remaining.

The section of Brattleboro north of the West River, formerly farmland, was mostly subdivided and developed during the 1960s and 1970s following the construction of Interstate 91, which runs north–south through the town. The area has little residential development and is dominated by larger commercial and industrial establishments and suburban-style shopping areas along Putney Road, including seven chain hotels and motels located within a short distance of each other.

Brattleboro is also the headquarters of the Holstein/Friesian Cattle Association, which houses and maintains the worldwide registries for those two breeds.

== Arts and culture ==
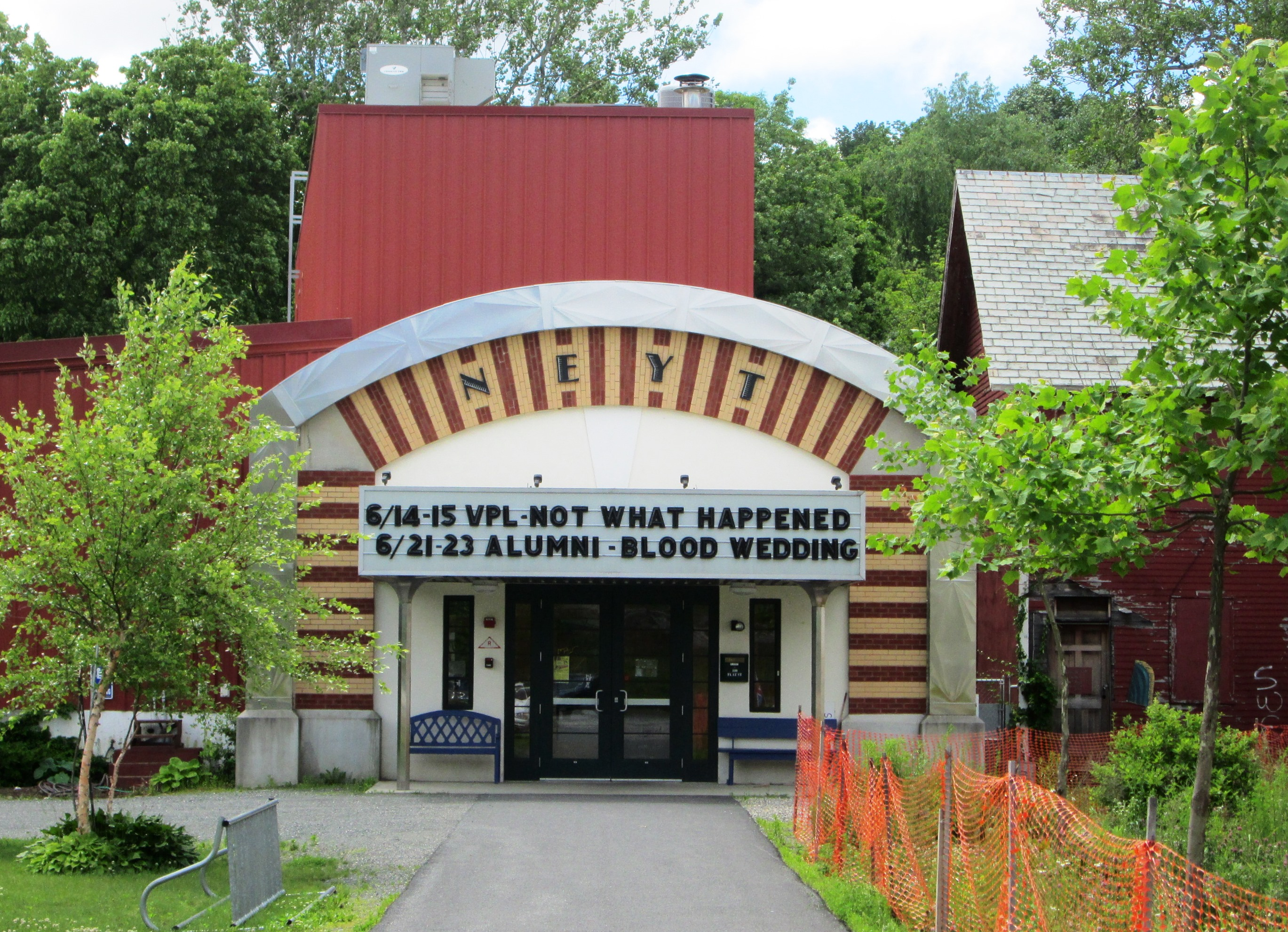
New England Youth Theatre

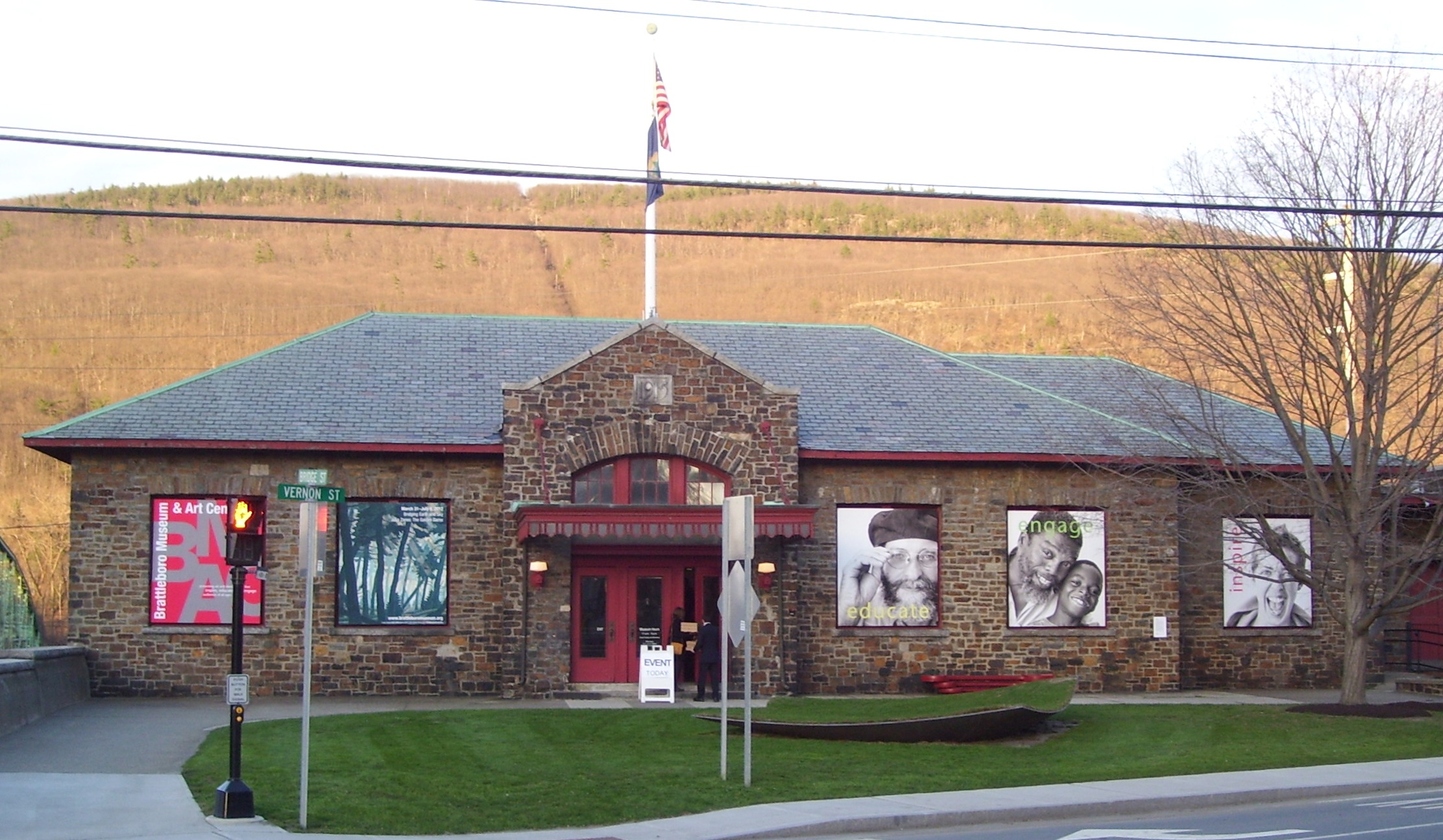
Brattleboro Museum and Art Center, formerly Union Station

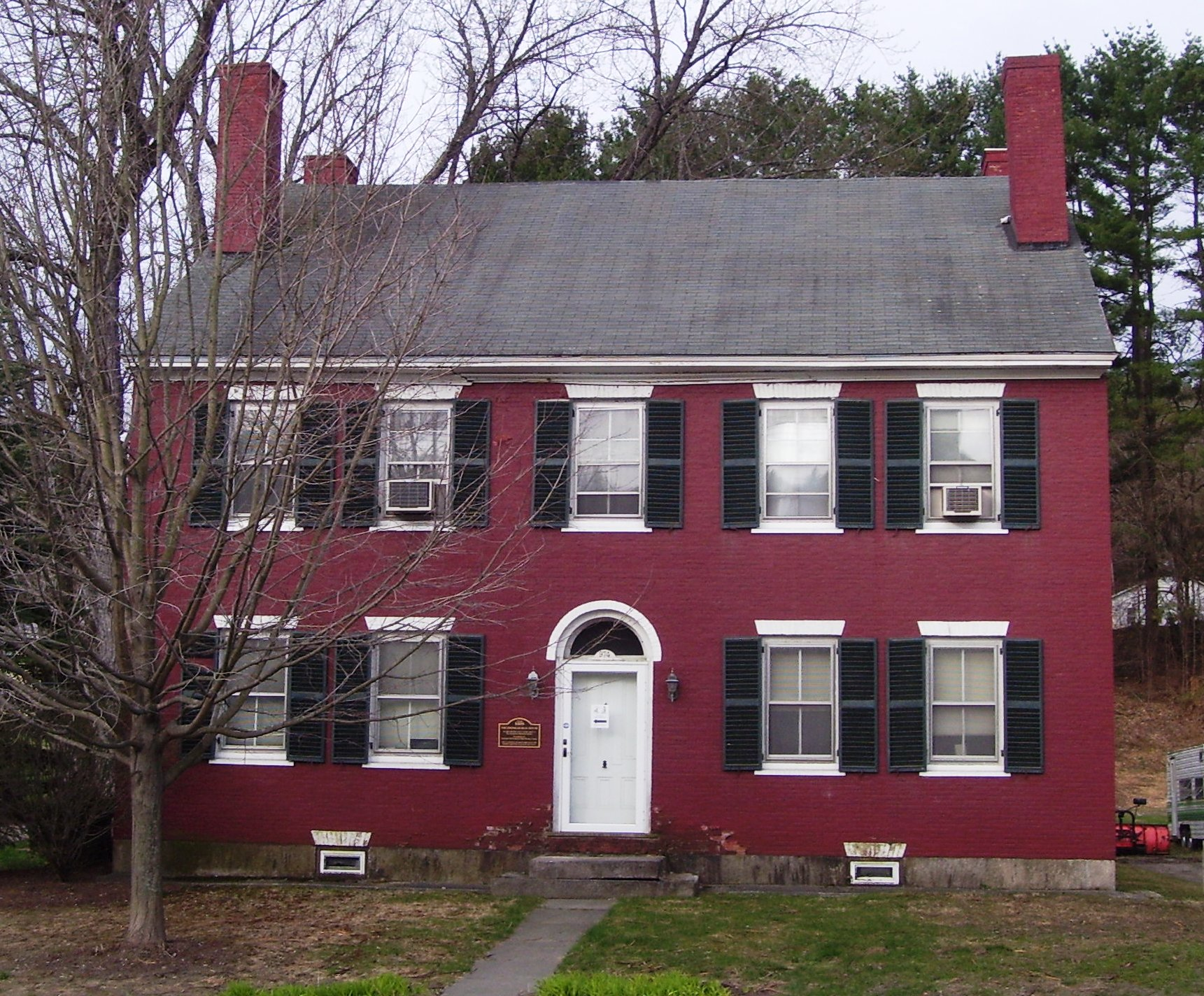
The Jeremiah Beal Museum of the Brattleboro Historical Society

Brooks Memorial Library houses a town historical archive, fine art paintings, and sculptures.

Brattleboro has a thriving arts community. It was listed in John Villani's book The 100 Best Small Art Towns in America, in which it was ranked No. 9 among 'arts towns' with a population of 30,000 or less.

On the first Friday of every month, an event known as "Gallery Walk" is held, during which galleries, artists, arts organizations, and stores display new art works or hold performances. Included in the organizations that participate are the Brattleboro Museum and Art Center, the Hooker-Dunham Theater and Gallery, the In-Sight Photography Project, River Gallery School, Through the Music, and the Windham Art Gallery. Gallery Walk is a mid-1990s creation of, and continues to be sponsored by, the Arts Council of Windham County.

Other arts organizations in Brattleboro include the Brattleboro Music Center, the Vermont Theatre Company, the New England Youth Theater, the Brattleboro Women's Chorus, the New England Center for Circus Arts (NECCA), the Vermont Performance Lab, and the Vermont Jazz Center.

=== Annual events ===
- January's annual Northern Roots Festival at the Brattleboro Music Center
- February's annual Winter Carnival
- Alpine Ski Jumping's Fred Harris Memorial Tournament, each February at the Harris Hill Ski Jump
- Brattleboro Women's Film Festival, each March
- Maple Open House Weekend, each March
- Annual Benefit Auction for River Gallery School each March
- Winston Prouty Center's Taste of the Town fund raiser each May
- Annual Slow Living Summit in May or June
- Vermont Theatre Company's Shakespeare-in-the-Park in June and July
- Brattleboro Free Folk Festival, founded in 2003
- Brattleboro Literary Festival in October
- Brattleboro Film Festival first two weeks of November

== Parks and recreation ==
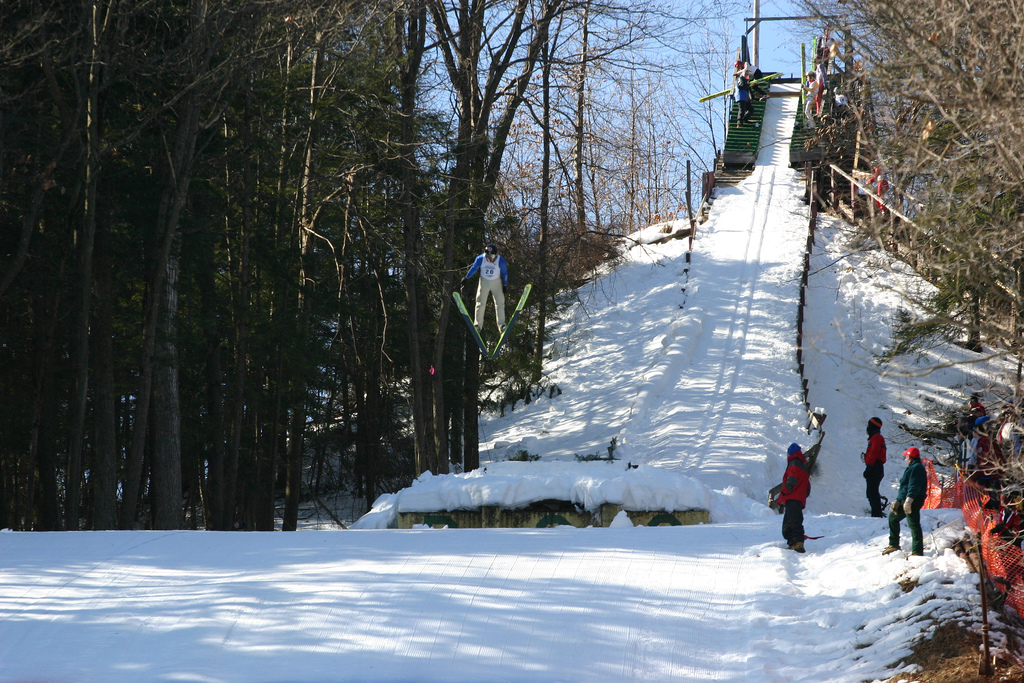
Harris Hill Ski Jump

The town operates and maintains the Gibson-Aiken Center, a large recreation and community activities facility, located downtown on Main Street, along with a number of parks and outdoor recreation centers, including Living Memorial Park, whose features include an outdoor swimming pool and a municipal skiing facility. There are bicycle lanes on Putney Road in the northern portion of town, on Guilford Street near Living Memorial Park, and on a short segment of Western Avenue in West Brattleboro. Open during the summer months, Fort Dummer State Park is named for, and located near, the original site of a Dummer's War-era stockade. The state park consists of 218 acres of protected forest, featuring hiking trails and a State campground, just south of the population center on wooded hills overlooking the Connecticut River.

Brattleboro sees a substantial seasonal influx of recreational skiers and snowboarders, many of them bound for the resorts at nearby Mount Snow and Stratton, but it is also a winter sports destination in and of itself. The town played an important role in the development and popularization of the skiing industry as a winter sport, with pioneering Brattleboro native and Dartmouth College alumnus Fred Harris, founder of the Dartmouth Outing Club (1909–1910), also establishing the Brattleboro Outing Club (in 1922), contributing to the first North American use of motor-driven ski lifts, and building the Harris Hill olympic-scale ski jumping facility, the site of international competitions every February that still attract daring ski-jumping athletes from all over the world.

== Government ==
Brattleboro employs a representative town meeting local government, wherein its citizens are represented at-large by a Selectboard of five members, and by several dozen town representatives elected from three municipal districts. The Selectboard, meeting on average every week or two, is considered part of the 'executive branch' of town government; its five members being elected to fill three one-year positions and two three-year positions. In turn, the Selectboard hires and supervises a full-time town manager. The town's three districts also each elect a representative to the Vermont House of Representatives.

=== State and federal representation ===
Brattleboro is represented at the national level by U.S. senators Bernie Sanders and Peter Welch, and by Congresswoman Becca Balint, who also represents Vermont's entire at-large federal congressional district.

At the state level in Montpelier:

- Sen. Wendy Harrison (D)
- Sen. Nader Hashim (D)
- Rep. Mollie Burke (P/D)
- Rep. Emilie Kornheiser (D)
- Rep. Tristan Toleno (D)

=== Ballot initiatives ===
- Brattleboro voted in support of a measure calling on the town's police force to arrest and indict President George W. Bush and Vice President Dick Cheney in March 2008. The vote was 2012–1795.
- In March 2017, Brattleboro voted in support of a ban on grocery store plastic bags by a 3 to 1 margin.

== Education ==
Brattleboro has a diverse mix of public and private primary, secondary and post-secondary schools and career centers. Sub-campuses of the Community College of Vermont and Vermont Technical College are located in Brattleboro; in the downtown's newly renovated Brooks House. Brattleboro was also home to the New England Academic Center of Union Institute and University, housed in the Marlboro College Graduate Center building.

SIT Graduate Institute, formerly known as the School for International Training, is a private higher education institution in northern Brattleboro. An outgrowth of The Experiment in International Living, which was founded in 1932 in nearby Putney, Vermont, the Graduate Institute offers master's degrees in several internationally oriented concentrations. Its students and faculty hail from all regions of the globe, giving Brattleboro a decidedly eclectic and international flair, and its notable alumni include native Vermonter and 1997 Nobel Peace Prize laureate Jody Williams.

Brattleboro currently has three public K–6 elementary schools. They are:

- Green Street School
- Oak Grove School
- Academy School

There is one public middle school, the Brattleboro Area Middle School (BAMS), and one public high school, the Brattleboro Union High School (BUHS). The Windham Southeast Supervisory Union, which oversees the public school system in the southeastern corner of Windham County, also administers a dedicated vocational education unit, the Windham Regional Career Center. Oak Meadow, a K–12 homeschool curriculum provider and distance learning school is also based out of downtown Brattleboro.

== Media ==
=== Print ===
The town is home to the Brattleboro Reformer (est. 1876 as the 'Windham County Democrat'), a daily newspaper with a weekday circulation of just over 10,000, and The Commons, a non-profit community weekly newspaper. The Parent Express, a community newspaper, circulates in Brattleboro; Keene, New Hampshire; and throughout Windham County, Vermont, and Cheshire County, New Hampshire. Local news is also carried in the Keene Sentinel and Rutland Herald.

=== Radio ===
There are several radio stations which broadcast from Brattleboro.

==== FM ====
- WVBA 88.9 FM, Vermont Public Radio outlet
- WKVT-FM 92.7 (classic hits)
- WTSA-FM 96.7 (adult contemporary)
- W262CL 100.3 (WKBK outlet)
- WVEW-LP 107.7 (community-supported low power station)

==== AM ====
- WTSA 1450 (All News Radio, Simulcast on 99.5 FM W258DQ)

=== Television ===
Brattleboro is not reached by terrestrial broadcast television due to the surrounding mountains, in addition to being just far enough away from major cities like Boston, Springfield, and Albany. However, as of October 2022, like the rest of Vermont except Bennington County, it is considered part of the Burlington / Plattsburgh television market. Comcast and Consolidated Communications are the major suppliers of cable television programming for Brattleboro. Local stations offered on Comcast include most major Burlington-area stations, as well as WMUR-TV (ABC) and WEKW-TV (NHPBS) from New Hampshire; and WGBY-TV from Springfield, Massachusetts.

== Infrastructure ==
=== Transportation ===
==== Roads and highways ====
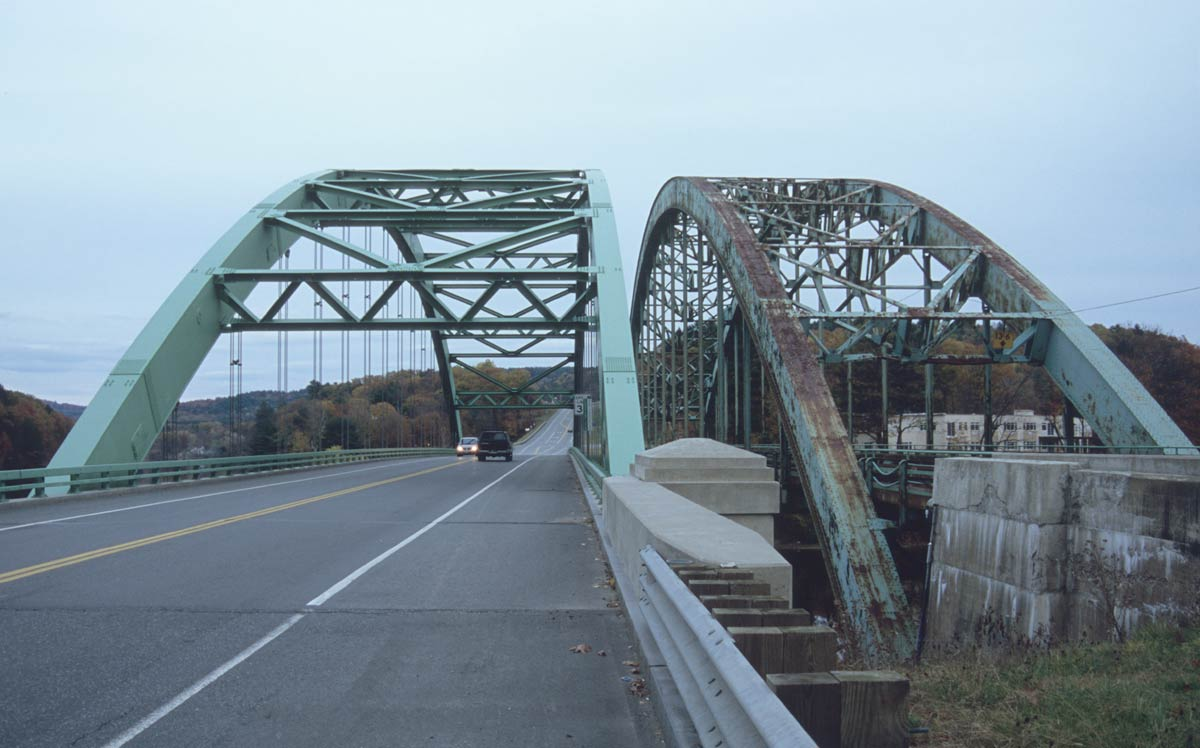
United States Navy Seabees Bridge over the Connecticut River

Brattleboro is crossed by six highways, including one Interstate highway. They are:

- Interstate 91
- U.S. Route 5 ("Connecticut River Byway")
- Vermont Route 9 ("Molly Stark Trail")
- Vermont Route 30
- Vermont Route 119
- Vermont Route 142

Vermont Route 9 runs from the New York border with Vermont, west of Bennington, traverses the southern backbone of the Green Mountains well west of Brattleboro, and eventually arrives in the heart of Brattleboro's downtown as High Street. Its other local names are The Molly Stark Trail, Marlboro Road, Western Avenue, Main Street, and Putney Road. It meets I-91 at a partial cloverleaf interchange (from where it is Exit 2 from the Interstate), then as it advances eastward into downtown, it overlaps U.S. Route 5 at the intersection of Main and High Streets. The road then runs north with Main Street into Putney Road then to the traffic circle at Interstate 91's Exit 3 (connected to that highway via a trumpet interchange westward from this roundabout), where it diverges from Route 5 and runs eastward into New Hampshire, becoming New Hampshire Route 9.

U.S. Route 5 enters Brattleboro at its border with the town of Guilford and runs north–south, through downtown, eventually exiting Brattleboro at its northern border with the town of Dummerston. Route 5's local names are Canal Street, Main Street, and Putney Road. Southbound, Route 5 detours along Park Place and part of Linden Street, as part of a one-way 'traffic triangle' at the north end of Main Street. Route 5, designated throughout Vermont as the Connecticut River Byway, is the only scenic byway in Vermont to receive national byway status.

Scenic Vermont Route 30 has its southern terminus in Brattleboro at the intersection of Park Place and Linden Street. From this point, it runs for about 12 miles on a graded roadbed along the West River's southern bank, connecting Brattleboro with various other New England towns and recreational areas in Windham County and Vermont. Its wide riverside paved shoulder makes it a popular cycling route. Route 30 exits Brattleboro at its border with Dummerston and continues northwest along the West River. Its local names within Brattleboro are Linden Street and West River Road.

Interstate 91, originating in Connecticut and terminating at the Canada–U.S. border, runs north–south through town, arcing westward around the town center. Its first three Vermont exits are in Brattleboro: Exit 1 serves the southern part of town, Exit 2 serves the western section of town connecting to local ski areas via Route 9, and Exit 3 serves the northern section of town and neighboring southwest New Hampshire. I-91's majestic twin-structure West River Bridge is, as of 2015, being rebuilt with a completely new design.

Vermont Route 119 begins as a 3-way intersection at Route 142 (Vernon St) before crossing the General John Stark Memorial Bridge (which opened in December 2024) over the Connecticut River and New England Central Railroad into Hinsdale, New Hampshire (Becoming NH 119), whose border lies just 0.08 miles (0.13 km) from the road's western end. It formerly began at a 5-way intersection, four road directions and one parking lot entrance, with U.S. Route 5 and VT Route 142, known as Bridge Street.

Vermont Route 142 begins at the same junction with Route 5 and Route 119 mentioned above, continuing southward, closely paralleling the New England Central Railroad for much of its length within town. Its local names are Vernon Street and Vernon Road, as it continues southward into the town of Vernon and eventually into Massachusetts.

==== Rail ====
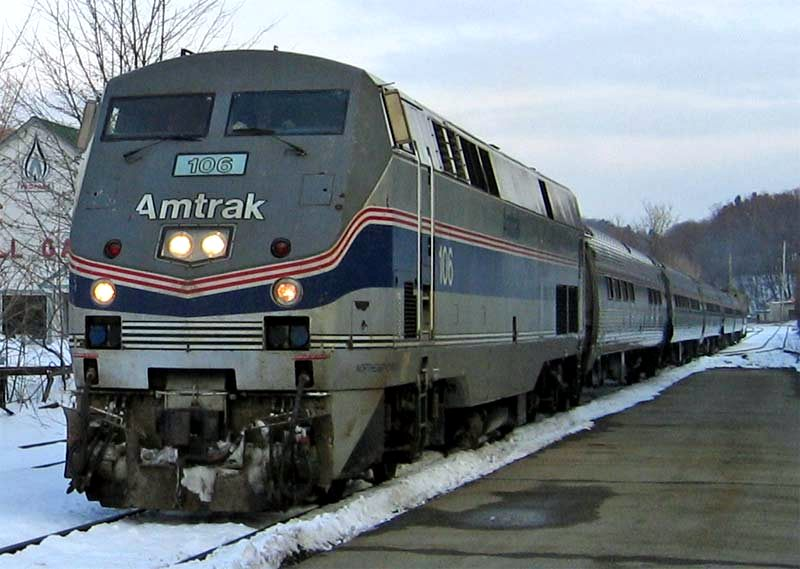
Amtrak train in Brattleboro

Amtrak, the national passenger rail system, operates its Vermonter service daily through Brattleboro, connecting the town by rail with Washington, D.C., and St. Albans, Vermont, and many stations in between. In 2014 Brattleboro was part of a $70 million re-alignment of the Vermonter's route to the old Montrealer route, restoring passenger rail service between Brattleboro and the western Massachusetts cities of Northampton and Greenfield. In 2014, upgrades to railroad tracks in Massachusetts and Connecticut, to the south, reduced rail travel time to New York and points south.

==== Bus ====
Southeast Vermont Transit, doing business as the MOOver and consisting of the former Current and Brattleboro BeeLine bus operations, operates 3 local bus routes around Brattleboro that also serve Guilford and Hinsdale, New Hampshire on weekdays and Saturday non-holidays. They also operated commuter bus routes between Brattleboro, Bellows Falls (weekdays) and Wilmington (everyday).

Greyhound also stops in Brattleboro.

==== Air ====
The closest small-craft airports to Brattleboro are the Deerfield Valley Regional Airport in West Dover to the west, and Dillant-Hopkins Airport in Keene, New Hampshire, to the east. The closest airports (both within 70 miles (110 km) north of the town) offering regularly scheduled domestic commercial flights include Lebanon Municipal Airport in West Lebanon, New Hampshire, and the Rutland – Southern Vermont Regional Airport, close to Rutland. Both airports feature daily Cape Air flights to and from Boston and White Plains, New York. The closest airports with regularly scheduled domestic and international flights are Bradley International Airport to the south, Manchester-Boston Regional Airport to the east, and Albany International Airport to the west, all of them less than two hours' driving distance from the town.

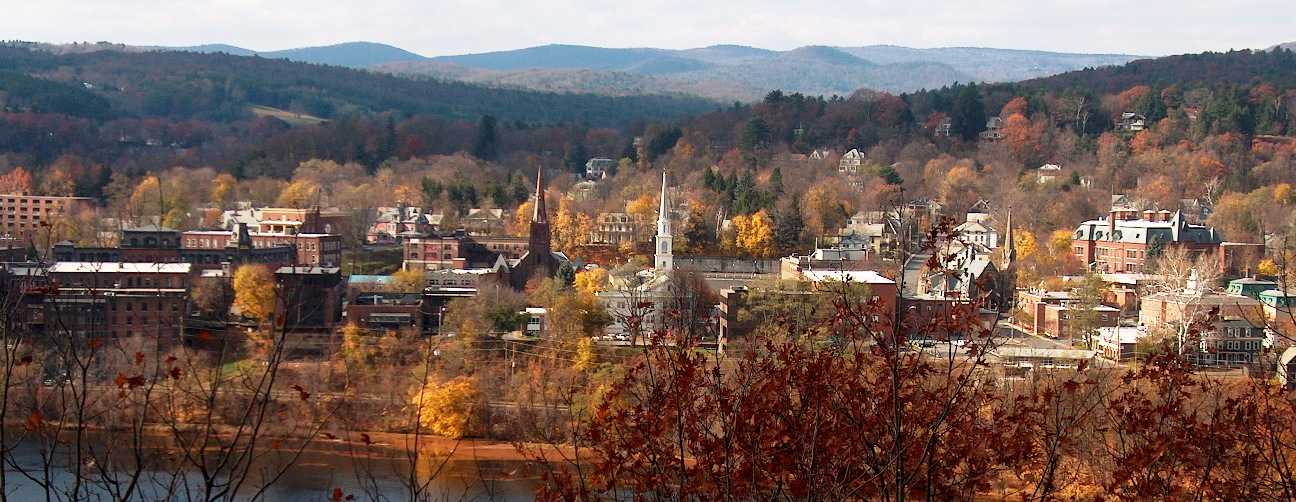
Downtown Brattleboro, as seen from a walking trail just across the Connecticut River, in New Hampshire. There are many miles of scenic trails in and around the town.

=== Fire department ===
The town of Brattleboro is protected by the Brattleboro Fire Department, founded in 1831 and located on Elliot Street in the downtown business district. There is also a sub-station in West Brattleboro.

=== Police ===
Brattleboro and West Brattleboro are serviced by the Brattleboro Police Department.

The Windham County Sheriff's Department provides prisoner transport and serves civil documents across Brattleboro and the rest of Windham County.

The Vermont State Police have a substation in Westminster and also serve the town.

=== Health care ===
- Brattleboro is home to the Brattleboro Memorial Hospital, a 61-bed community hospital serving southeastern Vermont since 1904. As of 2014, the hospital has 137 primary care and specialist physicians on its staff.
- Golden Cross Ambulance provides EMT and ambulance service for Brattleboro, as well as Cheshire County, New Hampshire.
- Brattleboro is also home to the Brattleboro Retreat, a large private, non-profit psychiatric hospital founded in 1834. The Retreat, as it is known locally, was one of the first acute mental health care facilities founded in the United States. It is the third largest employer in the town, and 45th largest in Vermont, with a workforce of about 400 as of 2013.
- Health Care and Rehabilitation Services of Vermont (HCRS) provides Brattleboro, and the rest of Windham and Windsor counties in Vermont, with outpatient services for mental health, substance abuse and developmental disabilities. The agency is headquartered in Springfield and also has other satellite offices elsewhere in Vermont in Bellows Falls, Windsor and White River Junction.

=== Utilities ===
Brattleboro's electricity is supplied by Green Mountain Power. Brattleboro's surface water supply is the Pleasant Valley Reservoir, which the Pleasant Valley Water Plant siphons through Brattleboro at a daily average of 1.0 to 1.5 million gallons per day. Also, backup water pumps are adjacent to West River Road just north of the Brattleboro Retreat.

Cable television in Brattleboro is provided by Comcast. Comcast and Consolidated Communications also provide the town with landline phone and high speed Internet service.

== See also ==
- National Register of Historic Places listings in Windham County, Vermont
- Vermont Center for the Deaf and Hard of Hearing
