= 2024 Vermont lieutenant gubernatorial election =

- November 5, 2024 (general election); January 9, 2025 (contingent election)
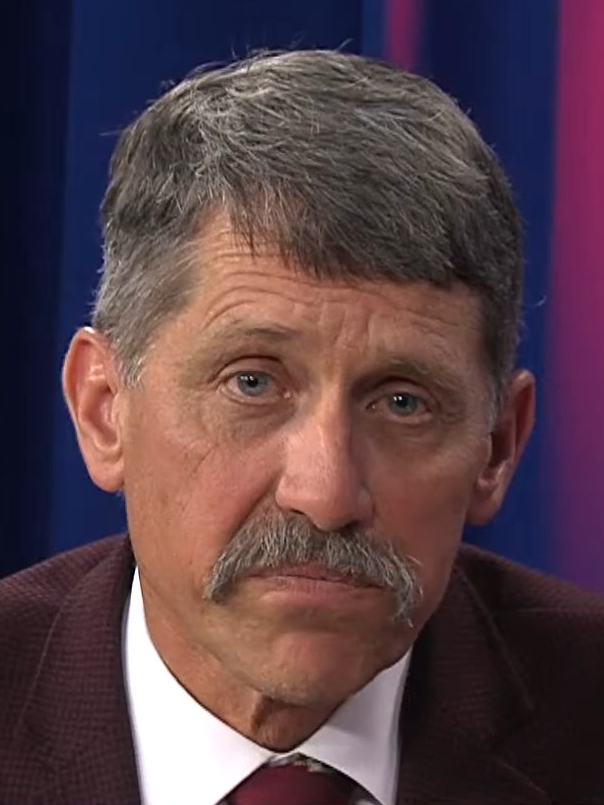

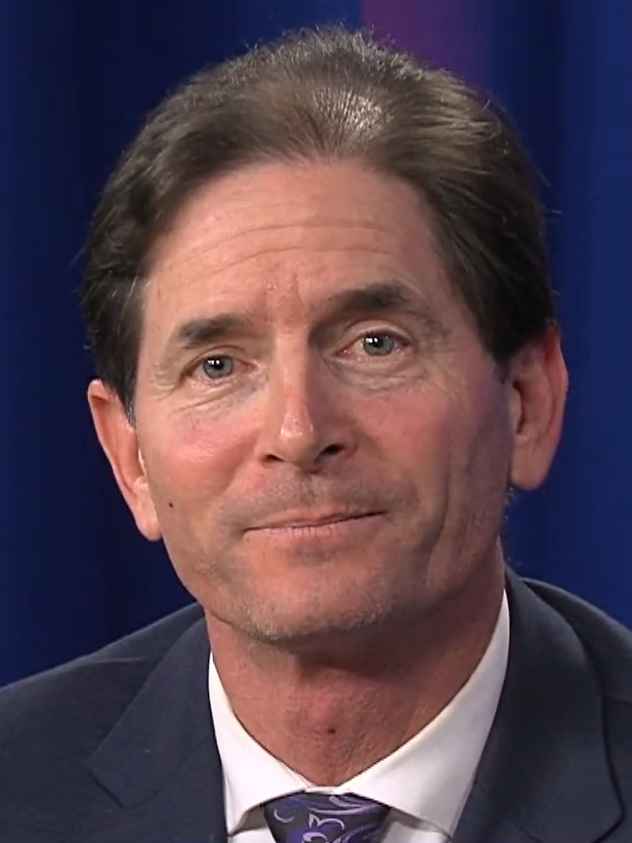
Nominee	John Rodgers	David Zuckerman
Party	Republican	Progressive
Alliance		Democratic
Electoral vote	158	18
Popular vote	171,854	165,876
Percentage	48.76%	47.07%
- Rodgers: 40–50% 50–60% 60–70% 70–80% 80–90% Zuckerman: 40–50% 50–60% 60–70% 70–80% Tie: 40–50% No votes
Lieutenant Governor before election
David Zuckerman
Progressive
Elected Lieutenant Governor
John Rodgers
Republican

The 2024 Vermont lieutenant gubernatorial election was held on November 5, 2024. Republican former state Senator John Rodgers defeated incumbent Progressive Lieutenant Governor David Zuckerman who was running for re-election to a fourth non-consecutive term in office.

The election was held concurrently with the 2024 U.S. presidential election, as well as elections to the United States Senate and elections to the United States House of Representatives and various state and local elections. Primary elections took place on August 13, 2024.

Zuckerman conceded to Rodgers on November 7, but suggested that the legislature could still elect him as the Constitution of Vermont allows lawmakers to vote to install any of the top three vote-getters in an election when no candidate reaches 50 percent of the vote. On January 9, 2025, the Vermont General Assembly elected Rodgers by a vote of 158 to 18. This marked the first time since 2008 that Vermont had a Governor and Lieutenant Governor of the same party. Additionally, for the first time since 1815, a lieutenant governor lost re-election. The election was considered a massive upset.

== Progressive primary ==
=== Candidates ===
==== Withdrew after nomination ====
- Zoraya Hightower, former Burlington city councilor

==== Replacement nominee ====
- David Zuckerman, (Note: Zuckerman is a member of the Progressive Party, but also runs with the Democratic Party's nomination via Vermont's electoral fusion system) incumbent lieutenant governor (2017–2021, 2023–2025)

=== Results ===
Progressive primary
Party	Candidate	Votes	%
Progressive	Zoraya Hightower	257	62.08
Progressive	David Zuckerman (write-in)	55	13.29
Write-in		29	7.01
Total valid votes		341	82.37
Total votes		414 (Note: There was one overvote and 72 undervotes.)	100.00

== Democratic primary ==
=== Candidates ===
==== Nominee ====
- David Zuckerman, lieutenant governor (2017–2021, 2023–2025)

==== Eliminated in primary ====
- Thomas Renner, deputy mayor of Winooski

=== Endorsements ===
Thomas Renner

State legislators

- Christopher Bray, state senator
- Kesha Ram Hinsdale, state senator
- Kitty Toll, former state representative (Renner's campaign treasurer)
David Zuckerman

State legislators

- Philip Baruth, president pro tempore of the Vermont Senate

Organizations

- Our Revolution

=== Campaign ===
Renner largely avoided criticizing Zuckerman, instead pointing to the representation he would bring to the role as a black gay man. Renner also promised not to "switch parties or add other party affiliations after the primary," which VTDigger interpreted as a dig against Zuckerman's membership in the Vermont Progressive Party. Renner described himself as "progressive, with a small 'p'." Zuckerman ran on his experience, pointing to the many years he served in the state legislature before his election as lieutenant governor.

Zuckerman outraised Renner significantly, taking in over $111,000 compared to roughly $43,000 for Renner. VTDigger pointed out that more than a third of Renner's fundraising came from wealthy Republicans; Renner claimed that these donations were unsolicited and came as a surprise to him.

=== Results ===
Democratic primary
Party	Candidate	Votes	%
Democratic	David Zuckerman (incumbent)	28,729	55.28
Democratic	Thomas Renner	18,838	36.25
Write-in		603	1.16
Total valid votes		48,170	92.69
Total votes		51,969 (Note: There were 39 overvotes and 3,760 undervotes.)	100.00

== Republican primary ==
=== Candidates ===
==== Nominee ====
- John Rodgers, former Democratic state senator (2013–2021)

==== Eliminated in primary ====
- Gregory Thayer, former Rutland city councilor and candidate for lieutenant governor in 2022

=== Endorsements ===
John Rodgers

Statewide officials

- Phil Scott, governor of Vermont (2017–present)

=== Campaign ===
Rodgers campaigned as a moderate, saying he does not plan to vote for Republican presidential nominee Donald Trump. Thayer positioned himself as the more conservative candidate, calling himself "the only Republican in this race."

=== Results ===
Republican primary
Party	Candidate	Votes	%
Republican	John Rodgers	13,840	55.39
Republican	Gregory Thayer	8,619	34.50
Write-in		234	0.94
Total valid votes		22,693	90.83
Total votes		24,985 (Note: There were 35 overvotes and 2,257 undervotes.)	100.00

== General election ==
=== Candidates ===
- Ian Diamondstone, trade consultant (Green Mountain Peace and Justice)
- John Rodgers, former Democratic state senator (2013–2021) (Republican)
- David Zuckerman, lieutenant governor (2017–2021, 2023–2025) (Progressive, Democratic)

=== Predictions ===
Source	Ranking	As of
Sabato's Crystal Ball	Safe D	July 25, 2024

=== Results ===
On November 5, Rodgers received a plurality of the vote over Zuckerman.

2024 Vermont lieutenant gubernatorial election
Party	Candidate	Votes	%	±%
Republican	John Rodgers	171,854	48.76%	+6.16%
Progressive/Democratic	David Zuckerman (incumbent)	165,876	47.07%	−6.78%
Green Mountain Peace and Justice Party	Ian Diamondstone	13,671	3.88%	+0.95%
Write-in		1,013	0.29%	-0.33%
Total votes		352,414	100.00%	
Republican gain from Progressive				

==== By county ====
County	John S. Rodgers Republican		David Zuckerman Democratic		Various candidates Other parties	
County	#	%	#	%	#	%
Addison	10,464	47.95%	10,651	48.81%	708	3.24%
Bennington	8,951	46.19%	9,392	48.47%	1,035	5.34%
Caledonia	9,704	60.37%	5,837	36.31%	533	3.31%
Chittenden	36,409	39.66%	51,742	56.36%	3,648	3.97%
Essex	2,260	68.82%	947	28.84%	77	2.34%
Franklin	16,136	62.1%	9,167	35.28%	682	2.62%
Grand Isle	2,762	57.09%	1,954	40.39%	122	2.53%
Lamoille	7,277	51.13%	6,511	45.75%	444	3.12%
Orange	9,135	53.69%	7,235	42.52%	645	3.79%
Orleans	9,869	68.97%	4,124	28.82%	317	2.21%
Rutland	19,263	58.73%	12,430	37.89%	1,109	3,38%
Washington	16,224	48.0%	16,219	47.98%	1,359	4.02%
Windham	8,745	35.79%	13,192	53.99%	2,498	10.22%
Windsor	14,655	44.9%	16,475	50.48%	1,507	4.62%
Totals	171,854	48.76%	165,876	47.07%	14,684	4.17%

Counties that flipped from Democratic to Republican

- Lamoille (largest municipality: Morristown)
- Orange (largest city: Randolph)
- Washington (largest municipality: Barre)

== Contingent election ==
Because the Constitution of Vermont requires a majority vote for election as lieutenant governor, the Vermont General Assembly voted on January 9, 2025, to determine the winner. Although the General Assembly had voted to ratify the winner of the popular vote since 1976, Diamondstone urged the General Assembly to elect Zuckerman on the grounds that a majority of voters supported the two left-of-center candidates in the race. Zuckerman conceded the popular election on November 7, 2024, but expressed agreement with Diamondstone's argument and said he would "point out those facts" to the legislators, though he said he would not make a "strong effort" on his own behalf and "[didn't] think [the Assembly was] going to decide to do that". The Green Mountain Peace and Justice Party called on the legislature to elect Zuckerman. Ultimately, the legislature chose to elect Rodgers despite these calls.

2024 Vermont lieutenant gubernatorial contingent election
Party	Candidate	Votes	%
Republican	John Rodgers	158	87.77%
Progressive/Democratic	David Zuckerman (incumbent)	18	10.23%
Green Mountain Peace and Justice Party	Ian Diamondstone	0	0.00%
Total votes		176	100.00%
Republican gain from Progressive			
