= 2022 Vermont lieutenant gubernatorial election =

- November 8, 2022
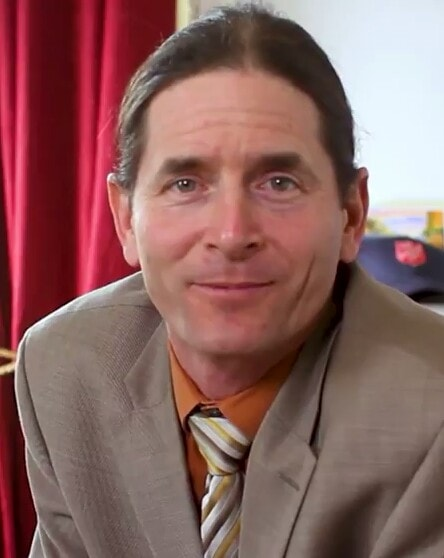

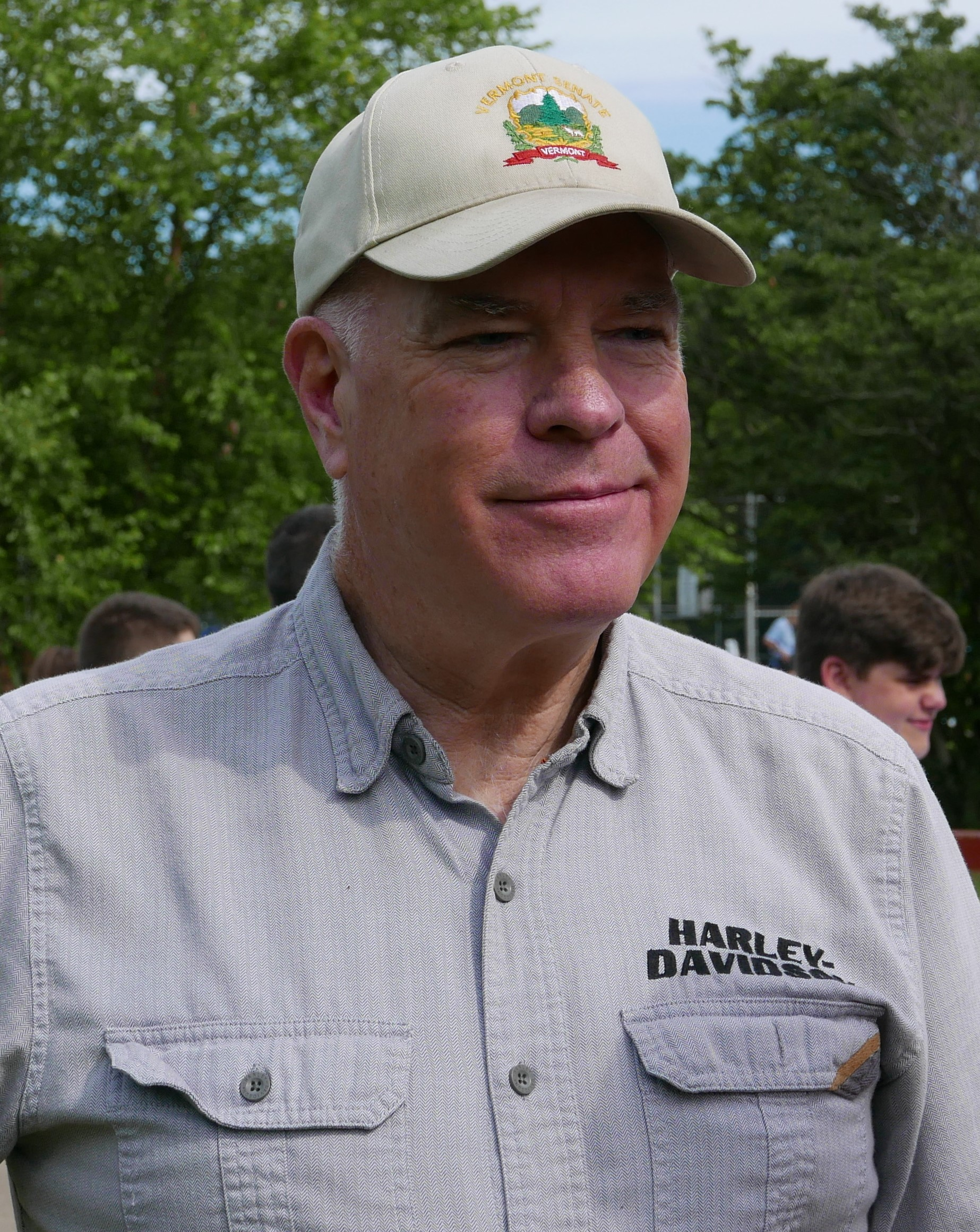
Nominee	David Zuckerman	Joe Benning
Party	Progressive	Republican
Alliance	Democratic
Popular vote	150,102	118,724
Percentage	53.85%	42.60%
- Zuckerman: 40–50% 50–60% 60–70% 70–80% 80–90% Benning: 40–50% 50–60% 60–70% 70–80% Tie: 40–50% No votes
Lieutenant Governor before election
Molly Gray
Democratic
Elected Lieutenant Governor
David Zuckerman
Progressive

The 2022 Vermont lieutenant gubernatorial election was held on November 8, 2022, to elect the lieutenant governor of the state of Vermont. The election coincided with various other federal and state elections, including for Governor of Vermont. Primary elections were held on August 9. Vermont is one of 21 states that elects its lieutenant governor separately from its governor.

Incumbent Democratic lieutenant governor Molly Gray retired to run for the U.S. House of Representatives. She was first elected in 2020, defeating Republican businessman Scott Milne with 51.3% of the vote. Former lieutenant governor David Zuckerman won the election as the Progressive candidate, defeating his Republican opponent Joe Benning. Benning was the second-best-performing Republican in Vermont during the 2022 cycle, only being outperformed by incumbent governor Phil Scott in the concurrent gubernatorial election.

== Democratic primary ==
=== Candidates ===
==== Nominee ====
- David Zuckerman, former lieutenant governor and nominee for Governor of Vermont in 2020 (Note: This individual is a member of the Vermont Progressive Party, but runs in Democratic primaries through Vermont's electoral fusion system.)

==== Eliminated in primary ====
- Charlie Kimbell, state representative
- Patricia Preston, President and CEO of Vermont Council on World Affairs
- Catherine "Kitty" Toll, University of Vermont trustee and former state representative

==== Declined ====
- T.J. Donovan, former Vermont Attorney General
- Steffen Gillom, president of the Windham County NAACP
- Molly Gray, incumbent lieutenant governor (ran for U.S. House)
- Debbie Ingram, former state senator and candidate for lieutenant governor in 2020
- Doug Racine, former lieutenant governor, nominee for Governor of Vermont in 2002, and candidate in 2010
- Kesha Ram, state senator and candidate for lieutenant governor in 2016 (running for U.S. House)
- Brenda Siegel, nonprofit executive, candidate for Governor of Vermont in 2018, and candidate for lieutenant governor in 2020 (running for governor)
- Shap Smith, former Speaker of the Vermont House of Representatives and candidate for lieutenant governor in 2016

=== Endorsements ===
Charlie Kimbell

State legislators

- John Gannon, state representative
- Curt Taylor, state representative
Patricia Preston

Local officials

- Peter Clavelle, former Mayor of Burlington (Progressive)
Kitty Toll

Statewide officials

- Beth Pearce, Vermont State Treasurer
- Howard Dean, former Governor of Vermont

State legislators

- Sara Coffey, state representative
- Matthew Hill, former state representative
David Zuckerman

U.S. Senators

- Bernie Sanders, U.S. Senator from Vermont

Organizations

- AFL–CIO

Political parties

- Vermont Progressive Party

=== Polling ===
Poll source	Date(s) administered	Sample size (Note: Key: A – all adults RV – registered voters LV – likely voters V – unclear)	Margin of error	Charlie Kimbell	Patricia Preston	Kitty Toll	David Zuckerman	Other	Undecided
University of New Hampshire	July 21–25, 2022	352 (LV)	± 5.2%	4%	7%	23%	38%	0%	27%

=== Results ===
Results by county: Zuckerman—50–60% Zuckerman—40–50% Toll—40–50% Toll—50–60% Toll—60–70%

Democratic primary results
Party	Candidate	Votes	%
Democratic	David Zuckerman	42,562	43.71
Democratic	Catherine Toll	37,868	38.89
Democratic	Patricia Preston	9,326	9.58
Democratic	Charles Kimbell	7,253	7.45
Write-in		356	0.37
Total votes		97,365	100.00

== Republican primary ==
=== Candidates ===
==== Nominee ====
- Joe Benning, state senator and former minority leader of the Vermont Senate

==== Eliminated in primary ====
- Gregory Thayer, accountant, former Rutland city councillor, and former chair of the Rutland Republican Party

==== Declined ====
- Corey Parent, state senator

=== Polling ===
Poll source	Date(s) administered	Sample size	Margin of error	Joe Benning	Gregory Thayer	Other	Undecided
University of New Hampshire	July 21–25, 2022	196 (LV)	± 7.0%	33%	20%	0%	47%

=== Results ===
Results by county: Benning—80–90% Benning—70–80% Benning—60–70% Benning—50–60% Thayer—50–60% Thayer—60–70%

Republican primary results
Party	Candidate	Votes	%
Republican	Joe Benning	14,678	53.51
Republican	Gregory Thayer	12,188	44.44
Write-in		562	2.05
Total votes		27,428	100.00

== Progressive primary ==
=== Candidates ===
==== Declared ====
- David Zuckerman, former lieutenant governor and nominee for Governor of Vermont in 2020 (write-in, endorsed by state party)

==== Withdrew ====
- Cindy Weed, former state representative (running for state house)

=== Results ===
Progressive primary results
Party	Candidate	Votes	%
Progressive	David Zuckerman (write-in)	118	55.14
Write-in		96	44.86
Total votes		214	100.00

== Other parties ==
=== Candidates ===
==== Declared ====
- Ian G. Diamondstone (Green Mountain)

== General election ==
=== Post-primary endorsements ===
David Zuckerman (P/D)

Newspapers

- Addison County Independent
Joe Benning (R)

Statewide officials

- Jim Douglas, former Governor of Vermont
- Phil Scott, Governor of Vermont and former Lieutenant Governor of Vermont

=== Polling ===
Poll source	Date(s) administered	Sample size	Margin of error	David Zuckerman (P/D)	Joe Benning (R)	Other	Undecided
University of New Hampshire	September 29 – October 3, 2022	865 (LV)	± 3.5%	51%	35%	2% (Note: Diamondstone with 2%; "Other" with 0%)	12%

=== Results ===
2022 Vermont lieutenant gubernatorial election
Party	Candidate	Votes	%	±%
Progressive	David Zuckerman (Note: Candidate received the nominations of both the Progressive and Democratic parties and will be listed on the ballot as "Progressive/Democratic" (candidate is primarily a Progressive).)	150,102	53.85%	+0.09
Republican	Joe Benning	118,724	42.60%	−3.42
Green Mountain	Ian Diamondstone	8,159	2.93%	N/A
Write-in		1,738	0.62%	+0.21
Total votes		278,823	100.00%	
Progressive gain from Democratic				

==== By county ====
County	David Zuckerman Democratic		Joe Benning Republican		Various candidates Other parties	
County	#	%	#	%	#	%
Addison	9,862	56.15%	7,262	41.34%	441	2.52%
Bennington	8,263	54.38%	6,231	41.01%	700	4.59%
Caledonia	4,661	37.08%	7,615	60.59%	293	2.33%
Chittenden	45,073	62.7%	25,156	34.99%	1,659	2.3%
Essex	713	30.05%	1,609	67.8%	51	2.15%
Franklin	7,833	40.92%	10,837	56.61%	474	2.48%
Grand Isle	1,825	47.33%	1,946	50.47%	85	2.2%
Lamoille	6,118	55.07%	4,724	42.52%	267	2.41%
Orange	6,516	49.96%	6,144	47.11%	383	2.94%
Orleans	4,117	39.19%	6,114	58.2%	274	2.61%
Rutland	11,242	43.94%	13,697	53.54%	645	2.52%
Washington	15,458	57.2%	10,839	40.11%	726	2.69%
Windham	12,274	63.94%	5,657	29.47%	1,266	6.6%
Windsor	15,120	58.01%	10,111	38.79%	832	3.19%
Totals	149,075	54.19%	117,942	42.87%	8,096	2.94%
