= Rebecca Holcombe =

American educator and politician

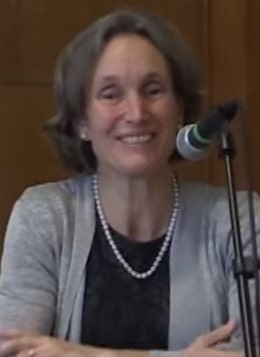

Member of the Vermont House of Representatives from the Windsor-Orange-2 district
- Incumbent
- Assumed office January 4, 2023 Serving with Jim Masland
- Preceded by: Timothy Briglin

Vermont Secretary of Education
- In office January 1, 2014 – April 1, 2018
- Governor: Peter Shumlin; Phil Scott
- Preceded by: Armando Vilaseca
- Succeeded by: Daniel French

Personal details
- Born: 1966 (age 59–60)
- Party: Democratic
- Education: Brown University (BA); Simmons University (MBA); Harvard University (PhD)

Rebecca Holcombe (born 1966) is an American educator and politician who served as the Vermont Secretary of Education from 2014 to 2018. In 2022, Holcombe was elected to one of the two seats in the Windsor-Orange-2 district in the Vermont House of Representatives.

On July 16, 2019, Holcombe announced her intention to run for Governor of Vermont in the 2020 election. In the Democratic primary, Holcombe placed second after incumbent lieutenant governor David Zuckerman.

== Early life and career ==
The daughter of United Nations employees, Holcombe grew up in Fiji, Afghanistan, Pakistan, and Sudan. She earned a Bachelor of Arts degree from Brown University, Master of Business Administration from Simmons University, and Doctorate in Education from the Harvard Graduate School of Education. She received certification as a classroom teacher through the Upper Valley Educators Institute, and completed coursework for her public school administrator certification at Lyndon State College.

Holcombe worked as a teacher, principal, and school district leader in the Upper Valley. She was the director of Dartmouth's Teacher Education program (2011–2014).

== Vermont Secretary of Education (2013–2018) ==
=== Appointment and confirmation ===
Governor Peter Shumlin (D) appointed Holcombe Secretary of Education in the fall of 2013, replacing interim commissioner Armando Vilaseca. Shumlin cited education philosophy similarities as the reason he appointed Holcombe, while Holcombe cited policy similarities in their shared support of an extended school year, support for early childhood education, and support for Personalized Learning Plans.

=== Tenure under Shumlin ===
Holcombe’s tenure coincided with a period of significant legislative change and new demands on Vermont’s Education System. In 2013, the Vermont General Assembly passed legislation relating to flexible pathways, universal subsidies for Pre-K, and approved new Education Quality Standards. That same year, Vermont was ranked 4th globally in science, and 7th in math compared to 49 states and 47 countries. Holcombe used this opportunity to demonstrate the failure of the NCLB Act. Her response received national attention, leading education activist and historian Diane Ravitch to call her a “hero” of American Education.

=== Reappointment by Scott ===
After Phil Scott (R) was sworn in as governor, he chose Holcombe as his secretary of education and reappointed her to the position. Holcombe was Scott's first Cabinet appointment upon taking office. In 2015, the Vermont General Assembly passed Act 46, an Act designed to unify very small districts to reduce administrative overhead, create more sustainable school districts, and improve student equity and outcomes. Holcombe was given responsibility for implementing this act. By the time Holcombe stepped down, the Agency of Education had supported the voluntary consolidation of 157 school districts into 39 unified school districts. Holcombe and the Vermont Agency of Education received national recognition for their innovative work on School Quality Reviews and equity through her extensive collaboration with school districts and over 2,000 members of the public. Holcombe also led the development of policy supporting transgender students and spoke against bigotry in the community.

=== Resignation ===
On March 27, 2018, Scott announced Holcombe's resignation from her role as Vermont Secretary of Education, effective April 1, 2018. Holcombe did not give a specific reason for her resignation. Phil Scott cited "personal reasons" for Holcombe's resignation, not a difference in policy, while Krista Huling, chair of the State Board of Education cited "differences in opinion about major issues." Several school boards were reportedly concerned with how Holcombe's resignation would affect the timeline of the implementation of Act 46 and the subsequent school mergers. After Holcombe's resignation, some school boards reportedly asked the state to slow down work on the implementation of Act 46. Deputy Secretary Heather Bouchey was appointed as interim Education Secretary on April 3, 2018. After stepping down, Holcombe wrote several pieces critical of Phil Scott's education policy, suggesting policy reasons for her resignation.

== 2020 gubernatorial campaign ==
On June 14, VTDigger reported that Holcombe was exploring a run for governor. Holcombe was quoted as saying, “I do believe the state needs a new direction, so I am giving serious consideration to a run”. On July 16, 2019, Holcombe announced her intention to run for Governor of Vermont in the 2020 election. Holcombe explained she was running because she, "joined Gov. Scott’s administration because I took him at his word that he was serious about working to make Vermont more affordable and more equitable [...] I resigned when I realized that was just talk.” The other two candidates in the Democratic Party primary were Progressive/Democrat Lt. Governor David Zuckerman and Bennington attorney Patrick Winburn. Due to the 2020 COVID-19 pandemic, she restricted herself to virtual campaigning.

== Electoral history ==
Democratic primary results
| Party | Candidate | Votes | % |
|---|---|---|---|
| Democratic | David Zuckerman | 48,150 | 44.03% |
| Democratic | Rebecca Holcombe | 37,599 | 34.38% |
| Democratic | Patrick Winburn | 7,662 | 7.01% |
| Democratic | Ralph Corbo | 1,288 | 1.18% |
| Total votes | | 109,365 | 100.0% |

== Personal life ==
Holcombe lives in Norwich, Vermont.

Holcombe served on the board of trustees for the Alice Peck Day Memorial Hospital.
