= David Zuckerman (politician) =

American politician (born 1971)

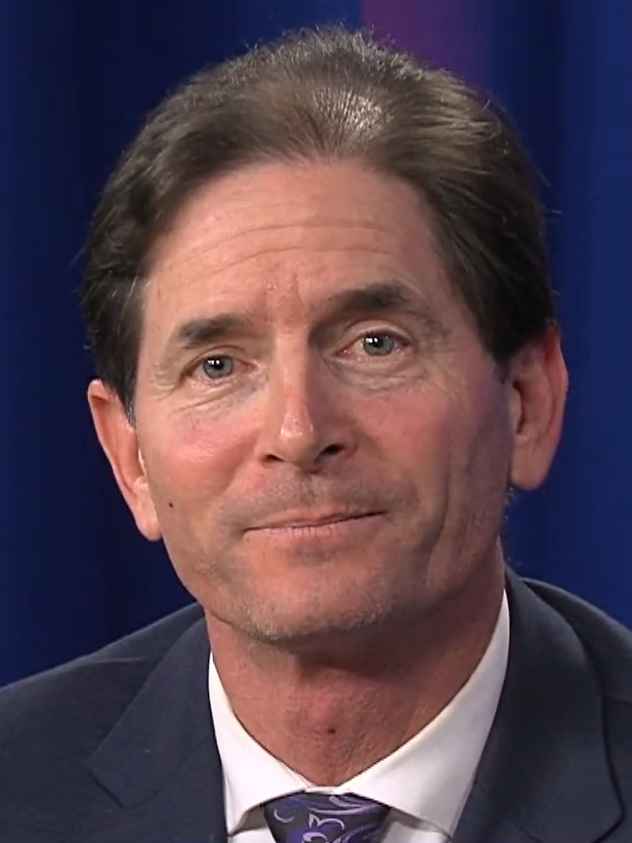
- Zuckerman in 2024

82nd & 84th Lieutenant Governor of Vermont
- In office January 5, 2023 – January 9, 2025
- Governor: Phil Scott
- Preceded by: Molly Gray
- Succeeded by: John S. Rodgers
- In office January 5, 2017 – January 7, 2021
- Governor: Phil Scott
- Preceded by: Phil Scott
- Succeeded by: Molly Gray

Member of the Vermont Senate from the Chittenden district
- In office January 9, 2013 – January 2, 2017
- Preceded by: Multi-member district
- Succeeded by: Debbie Ingram; Christopher Pearson

Member of the Vermont House of Representatives from the Chittenden-3-4 district
- In office January 5, 1997 – January 5, 2011
- Preceded by: Multi-member district
- Succeeded by: Multi-member district

Personal details
- Born: August 16, 1971 (age 55) Boston, Massachusetts, U.S.
- Party: Progressive
- Other political affiliations: Democratic
- Spouse: Rachel Nevitt
- Children: 1
- Education: University of Vermont (BA)

David E. Zuckerman (born August 16, 1971) is an American politician who was the 82nd and 84th lieutenant governor of Vermont from 2017 to 2021 and again from 2023 to 2025. A member of the Vermont Progressive Party, he previously served in the Vermont House of Representatives for seven terms (1997–2011), and the Vermont Senate for two (2013–2017). In 2020, Zuckerman was a candidate for governor of Vermont. He ran with the support of both the Progressive Party and the Democratic Party, but lost to incumbent governor Phil Scott in the general election.

In 2016, Zuckerman ran for lieutenant governor as a Progressive, and also received the nomination of the Democratic Party by defeating Speaker of the Vermont House of Representatives Shap Smith and Representative Kesha Ram in the Democratic primary. He defeated Republican State Senator Randy Brock in the 2016 general election. Zuckerman was reelected in 2018 and again in 2022 following a two-year hiatus from elected office, during which he unsuccessfully ran for governor. He ran for re-election in 2024, but was defeated by Republican challenger John S. Rodgers.

Zuckerman was the first Progressive Party candidate to win statewide office in Vermont and the only third party candidate to win a statewide election in the 2022 United States elections. Other Progressive-endorsed candidates who have won statewide-office elections, including Doug Hoffer for Vermont state auditor, were primarily affiliated with the Vermont Democratic Party.

== Early life and education ==
Born in Boston on August 16, 1971, Zuckerman grew up in Brookline, Massachusetts and graduated from Brookline High School in 1989. His father is Jewish. In 1995, he graduated from the University of Vermont with a Bachelor of Arts degree in environmental studies and a minor in chemistry.

== Career ==
=== State House of Representatives ===
Prior to serving in the House, he served on the Burlington Electric Commission. Zuckerman ran for the Vermont House of Representatives in 1994 while still enrolled in college and lost by 59 votes. He ran again two years later and become the fourth Progressive Party member to serve in the Vermont House, a seat that he held through 2011.

While in the House, he served for six years on the Natural Resources and Energy Committee as well as six years on the Agriculture Committee, including four as the chairperson. He finished his time in the House of Representatives by serving on the Ways and Means Committee.

Zuckerman considered running for the U.S. House of Representatives in the 2006 election when Vermont's lone House seat was being vacated by independent Bernie Sanders, who was a candidate for the United States Senate. Zuckerman eventually decided not to run in order to continue serving as Agriculture chairman in the Vermont House.

=== State Senate ===
Zuckerman ran for Vermont State Senate from Chittenden County in the 2012 elections and won a seat in this six-member, at-large district. In the Senate, Zuckerman served on the Agriculture and Education committees; he was vice chairperson of Agriculture, and clerk of Education.

In his time in the legislature, Zuckerman was involved in the passage of Vermont's civil union and marriage equality laws, workers' rights legislation, increasing the minimum wage, sustainable (economic and environmental) agricultural policy, cannabis policy reform, election law reform, many renewable energy initiatives, progressive taxation policy as well as universal healthcare.

In January 2014, Zuckerman introduced legislation that would allow for recreational sale and use of cannabis. If passed it would allow for possession of up to two ounces of cannabis, and the cultivation of up to three plants for anyone 21 and over. It would also have the penalty for underage consumption of cannabis be the same as the current penalty for underage drinking.

=== Lieutenant governor ===
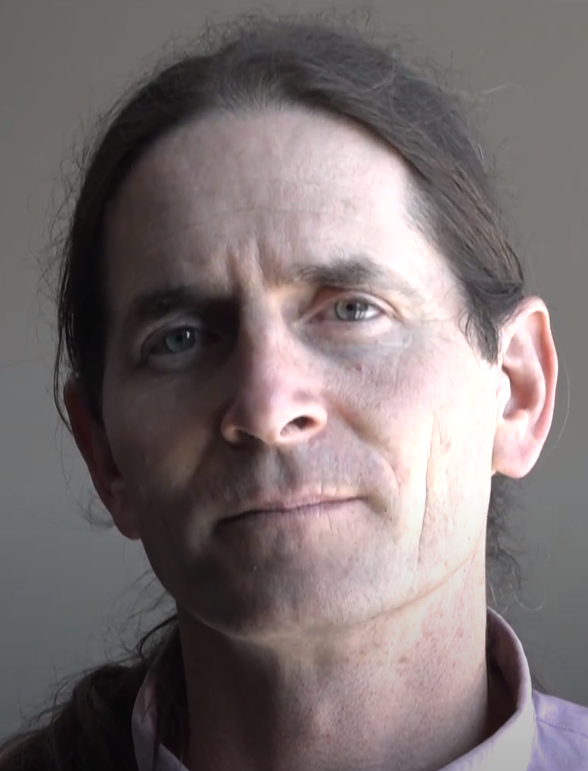
Zuckerman in 2017

In 2016, Zuckerman ran for lieutenant governor as a Progressive candidate, earning the endorsement of Bernie Sanders before the August 9 primary. He ran unopposed in the Progressive primary, while simultaneously defeating Vermont House Speaker Shap Smith and Representative Kesha Ram to win the Democratic nomination, and went on to defeat Republican Randy Brock in the general election. Zuckerman was reelected in 2018, defeating Republican Donald H. Turner by a margin of 57% to 39%.

Zuckerman opted not to seek reelection for a third term in 2020, instead running against Republican incumbent governor Phil Scott. He ran with the support of both the Progressive Party and the Democratic Party, but lost to incumbent governor Phil Scott by a margin of 68% to 27% in the 2020 general election.

When Lieutenant Governor Molly Gray opted not to run for reelection in order to run in the Democratic primary for Vermont's open U.S. House seat, Zuckerman announced a third campaign for lieutenant governor in 2022. He won the Democratic primary and the general election in 2022, defeating Republican nominee Joe Benning by a margin of 54% to 43% and becoming only the second person in Vermont history to be elected to serve non-consecutive terms as lieutenant governor. The other is Paul Brigham.

Zuckerman ran for re-election in 2024, but lost to challenger John S. Rodgers, who received a plurality of the vote against Zuckerman, with an initial estimate of 46.2% to 44.6%. Green Mountain Peace & Freedom Party nominee Ian Diamondstone finished third with 3.7% percent of the vote. Because the Constitution of Vermont requires a majority vote for election as lieutenant governor, the Vermont General Assembly voted on January 9, 2025 to determine the winner. Zuckerman conceded the election on November 7, 2024, but did not declare whether he would contest the January legislative election. On January 9, Rodgers was officially elected as the 85th lieutenant governor of Vermont by a vote of 158 to 18.

=== Agriculture ===
Beginning in 1999, Zuckerman and his wife, Rachel Nevitt, built a successful organic farm in Burlington's Intervale, a network of a dozen farms located in and serving the city. Zuckerman served on the American Farm Bureau Federation Young Farmers & Ranchers Committee. He is also a member of the Vermont Farm Bureau and the Northeast Organic Farming Association chapter in Vermont.

In 2009, Zuckerman and Nevitt moved their farm to 150 acres (610,000 m^{2}) in Hinesburg where they grow 20 acres (81,000 m^{2}) of vegetables and CBD, and raise 1,000 chickens. Their produce is almost exclusively sold within Chittenden County. They operate a summer community-supported agriculture (CSA) with 275 members and a winter CSA with 125 members, and sell year round at the local Burlington farmers market.

== Political positions ==
=== Labor ===
Zuckerman has been an advocate of labor protections such as raising the minimum wage, paid family leave, and increasing protections for workers.

=== Opposition to Bush administration ===
On April 25, 2006, Zuckerman introduced a resolution for the Vermont State Legislature to ask the United States Congress to impeach President George W. Bush. The motion failed 87–60 in a roll call vote on April 25, 2007.

=== Property tax reform ===
Zuckerman supported a bill to lower property tax rates for households earning less than $200,000 in the 2015–16 session. He also helped pass legislation to model this reform in time for the 2017 session.

=== Equal pay ===
Zuckerman was a sponsor of H.440 in 2001, a bill which would require equal pay for equal work.

=== GMO labeling ===
In 2014, Zuckerman was the lead Senate author of Vermont's first-in-the-nation GMO food-labeling law.

=== Vaccines ===
Zuckerman is critical of the philosophy of mandatory vaccinations, a view that led to scrutiny during the coronavirus pandemic. He has said that he is skeptical about the CDC's position on vaccines due to its purported connections to the pharmaceutical industry, but believes the science of vaccination is sound. He said that he believed that most people should vaccinate their children, but believes in exemptions for medical or religious reasons. He said that some of his constituents had said that vaccines gave their children allergic reactions. He has said that his own daughter is vaccinated.

=== Opposition to Act 73 ===
After leaving office in January 2025, Zuckerman became a vocal critic of Act 73, a legislative measure aimed at addressing Vermont's affordability crisis. He argued that the law relies excessively on austerity measures that would disproportionately affect working-class Vermonters. He instead advocated for progressive taxation, including higher taxes on wealthy residents and second homeowners, to fund public services such as affordable housing and education.

Zuckerman expressed disappointment over the legislature's failure to pass a proposed bill that would have allocated between US $70 million and US $100 million annually for affordable housing. He emphasized the importance of addressing economic inequality and called for reforms such as district consolidation and efficiency improvements within the Vermont Agency of Human Services and the Vermont Department of Education to reduce property taxes and improve service delivery.

== WDEV radio show ==
Following his departure from public office, Zuckerman launched a weekly radio program on WDEV, airing Thursdays from 9:00 a.m. to 11:00 a.m. The show features discussions on current Vermont and national issues, with guests ranging from policy experts and elected officials to community members. The program promotes respectful dialogue across political divides and covers topics such as agriculture, housing, taxation, and civic engagement.

Zuckerman's involvement with WDEV came amid broader changes at the station following its acquisition by Myers Mermel, a former Republican Senate candidate and president of the conservative Ethan Allen Institute. Under Mermel’s leadership, WDEV expanded its programming to include a more progressive and youth-oriented direction, forming partnerships with The Nation magazine and adding new hosts such as Zuckerman.

Zuckerman's show has become a platform for grassroots discourse and civic participation, continuing his commitment to progressive advocacy and public engagement beyond elected office.

=== Social media engagement ===
In addition to his radio work, Zuckerman has remained active in Vermont political circles through social media. He regularly uses platforms such as X (formerly Twitter) and Facebook to share commentary on legislative developments, promote progressive causes, and engage with constituents and activists. His posts often highlight issues including housing, education, labor rights, and climate policy, and he has used these platforms to amplify grassroots campaigns and mobilize support for local initiatives.

== Personal life ==
Zuckerman and his wife Rachel live in Hinesburg, Vermont with their one child, and continue to operate Full Moon Farm.

In 2025, after leaving office, Zuckerman began hosting a segment of WDEV's Vermont Viewpoint.

== Electoral history ==
David Zuckerman electoral history

=== Vermont General Assembly ===
1996 Vermont House of Representatives Chittenden 7-3 district election
Party	Candidate	Votes	%
Progressive	David Zuckerman	1,995	36.38%
Progressive	Dean Corren (incumbent)	1,988	36.25%
Democratic	Scott Baldwin	1,428	26.04%
Write-in		73	1.33%
Total votes		5,484	100.00%

1998 Vermont House of Representatives Chittenden 7-3 district election
Party	Candidate	Votes	%
Progressive	David Zuckerman (incumbent)	1,021	47.51%
Progressive	Dean Corren (incumbent)	1,010	47.00%
Write-in		118	5.49%
Total votes		2,149	100.00%

2000 Vermont House of Representatives Chittenden 7-3 district election
Party	Candidate	Votes	%
Progressive	David Zuckerman (incumbent)	2,090	52.86%
Progressive	Bob Kiss	1,730	43.75%
Write-in		134	4.54%
Total votes		3,954	100.00%

2002 Vermont House of Representatives Chittenden 3–4 district election
Primary election
Party	Candidate	Votes	%
Progressive	David Zuckerman (incumbent)	59	50.86%
Progressive	Bob Kiss (incumbent)	53	45.69%
Write-in		4	3.45%
Total votes		116	100.00%
	Blank/spoiled	9	
General election
Progressive	David Zuckerman (incumbent)	1,200	31.91%
Progressive	Bob Kiss (incumbent)	1,022	27.17%
Democratic	Anthony Gierzynski	790	21.01%
Democratic	Nancy Kirby	736	19.57%
Write-in		13	0.35%
Total votes		3,761	100.00%

2004 Vermont House of Representatives Chittenden 3–4 district election
Party	Candidate	Votes	%
Progressive	David Zuckerman (incumbent)	2,424	52.88%
Progressive	Bob Kiss (incumbent)	2,095	45.70%
Write-in		65	1.42%
Total votes		4,584	100.00%

2006 Vermont House of Representatives Chittenden 3–4 district election
Party	Candidate	Votes	%
Progressive	David Zuckerman (incumbent)	1,634	55.26%
Progressive	Christopher Pearson	1,253	42.37%
Write-in		70	2.37%
Total votes		2,957	100.00%

2008 Vermont House of Representatives Chittenden 3–4 district election
Party	Candidate	Votes	%
Progressive	David Zuckerman (incumbent)	2,316	34.18%
Democratic	Kesha Ram Hinsdale	2,164	31.94%
Progressive	Christopher Pearson (incumbent)	1,494	22.05%
Democratic	Phillip Ortego	781	11.53%
Write-in		20	0.30%
Total votes		6,775	100.00%

2012 Vermont Senate Chittenden district election
Primary election
Party	Candidate	Votes	%
Democratic	Tim Ashe (incumbent)	9,150	16.18%
Democratic	Virginia Lyons (incumbent)	8,873	15.69%
Democratic	Sally Fox (incumbent)	8,558	15.14%
Democratic	David Zuckerman	7,838	13.86%
Democratic	Philip Baruth (incumbent)	6,859	12.13%
Democratic	Debbie Ingram	5,068	8.96%
Democratic	Peter D. Hunt	4,595	8.13%
Democratic	Ed Adrian	3,629	6.42%
Democratic	Loyal Ploof	1,696	3.00%
Write-in		275	0.49%
Total votes		56,541	100.00%
	Blanks/spoiled	23,835	
General election
Democratic	Tim Ashe (incumbent)		
Progressive	Tim Ashe (incumbent)		
Total	Tim Ashe (incumbent)	37,357	13.26%
Democratic	Virginia Lyons (incumbent)	34,957	12.41%
Democratic	Sally Fox (incumbent)	34,909	12.39%
Progressive	David Zuckerman	32,253	11.45%
Republican	Dianne Snelling (incumbent)	31,523	11.19%
Democratic	Philip Baruth (incumbent)	30,942	10.98%
Democratic	Debbie Ingram	23,441	8.32%
Independent	Bob Kiss	12,324	4.37%
Independent	Patrick N. Brown	12,217	4.34%
Tea Party	Shelley Palmer	8,362	2.97%
Independent	Robert Letovsky	8,321	2.95%
Independent	Sean Selby	6,157	2.19%
Green	Larkin Forney	5,618	1.99%
Progressive	Richard Jeroloman	3,322	1.18%
Total votes		281,703	100.00%

2014 Vermont Senate Chittenden district election
Primary election
Party	Candidate	Votes	%
Democratic	Tim Ashe (incumbent)	3,405	17.76%
Democratic	Virginia Lyons (incumbent)	3,320	17.32%
Democratic	David Zuckerman (incumbent)	3,215	16.77%
Democratic	Michael Sirotkin	3,151	16.43%
Democratic	Philip Baruth (incumbent)	3,139	16.37%
Democratic	Dawn Ellis	2,814	14.68%
Write-in		130	0.68%
Total votes		19,174	100.00%
	Blanks/spoiled	7,672	
General election
Democratic	Virginia Lyons (incumbent)	23,488	12.57%
Democratic	Tim Ashe (incumbent)		
Progressive	Tim Ashe (incumbent)		
Total	Tim Ashe (incumbent)	22,790	12.20%
Democratic	Philip Baruth (incumbent)	22,217	11.89%
Republican	Dianne Snelling (incumbent)	21,855	11.70%
Progressive	David Zuckerman	21,360	11.43%
Democratic	Michael Sirotkin	19,738	10.56%
Democratic	Dawn Ellis	18,432	9.86%
Republican	Joy Limoge	15,853	8.48%
Libertarian	Paul Washburn	4,113	2.20%
Libertarian	John Cisar	3,896	2.09%
Libertarian	Christopher Coolidge	3,694	1.98%
Libertarian	Travis Spencer	3,405	1.82%
Libertarian	Ben Mayer	3,310	1.77%
Libertarian	Glyn Wilkinson	2,706	1.45%
Total votes		186,857	100.00%

=== Vermont governor and lieutenant governor ===
2016 Democratic primary, Vermont lieutenant governor
Party	Candidate	Votes	%
Democratic	Dave Zuckerman	31,027	44.29%
Democratic	Shap Smith	26,569	37.93%
Democratic	Kesha Ram	12,133	17.32%
Write-in		323	0.46%
Total votes		70,052	100.00%

2016 Progressive primary, Vermont lieutenant governor
Party	Candidate	Votes	%
Progressive	Dave Zuckerman (write-in)	228	50.67%
Progressive	Boots Wardinski	150	33.33%
Write-in	Write-ins (other)	72	16.00%
Total votes		450	100.00%

2016 general election, Vermont Lieutenant Governor
Party	Candidate	Votes	%
Progressive/Democratic	Dave Zuckerman	159,738	52.09%
Republican	Randy Brock	139,344	45.44%
Liberty Union	Boots Wardinski	7,038	2.29%
Write-in		559	0.18%
Total votes		306,679	100.00%

2018 Democratic primary, Vermont lieutenant governor
Party	Candidate	Votes	%
Democratic	Dave Zuckerman (incumbent)	59,131	98.00%
Write-in		1,204	2.00%
Total votes		60,335	100.00%
	Blank/overvotes	8,844	

2018 Progressive primary, Vermont lieutenant governor
Party	Candidate	Votes	%
Progressive	Dave Zuckerman (incumbent) (write-in)	390	78.47%
Write-in	Write-ins (other)	107	21.53%
Total votes		497	100%
	Blank/overvotes	146	

2018 general election, Vermont Lieutenant Governor
Party	Candidate	Votes	%
Progressive/Democratic	Dave Zuckerman	158,530	58.44%
Republican	Don Turner Jr.	108,395	39.96%
Liberty Union	Murray Ngoima	4,108	1.51%
Write-in		240	0.09%
Total votes		271,273	100%
N/A	Blank votes	6,901	
N/A	Over votes	34	

2020 Republican primary, Vermont governor
Party	Candidate	Votes	%
Republican	Phil Scott (incumbent)	42,275	72.67%
Republican	John Klar	12,762	21.94%
Republican	Emily Peyton	970	1.67%
Republican	Douglas Cavett	966	1.66%
Republican	Bernard Peters	772	1.33%
Republican	David Zuckerman (write-in)	24	0.04%
Write-in	Write-ins (others)	402	0.69%
Total votes		58,171	100.00%
	Blank/spoiled	455	

2020 Democratic primary, Vermont governor
Party	Candidate	Votes	%
Democratic	David Zuckerman	48,150	47.56%
Democratic	Rebecca Holcombe	37,599	37.14%
Democratic	Patrick Winburn	7,662	7.57%
Democratic	Ralph Corbo	1,288	1.27%
Write-in		6,533	6.45%
Total votes		101,232	100.00%
	Blank/spoiled	8,133	

2020 Progressive primary, Vermont governor
Party	Candidate	Votes	%
Progressive	David Zuckerman (write-in)	273	32.62%
Progressive	Cris Ericson	254	30.35%
Progressive	Boots Wardinski	239	28.55%
Write-in	Write-ins (others)	71	8.48%
Total votes		837	100.00%
	Blank/spoiled	104	

2020 general election, Vermont governor
Party	Candidate	Votes	%	±%
Republican	Phil Scott (incumbent)	248,412	68.49%	+13.30
Progressive	David Zuckerman	99,214	27.35%	N/A
Independent	Kevin Hoyt	4,576	1.26%	N/A
Independent	Emily Peyton	3,505	0.97%	N/A
Independent	Erynn Hazlett Whitney	1,777	0.49%	N/A
Independent	Wayne Billado III	1,431	0.39%	N/A
Independent	Michael A. Devost	1,160	0.32%	N/A
Independent	Charly Dickerson	1,037	0.29%	N/A
Write-in		1,599	0.44%	N/A
Total votes		362,711	100.00%	+32.33
Rejected ballots		8,257	2.23%	
Turnout		370,968	73.27%	
Registered electors		506,312		
Republican hold				

2022 Democratic primary, Vermont lieutenant governor
Party	Candidate	Votes	%
Democratic	David Zuckerman	42,562	43.71%
Democratic	Catherine Toll	37,868	38.89%
Democratic	Patricia Preston	9,326	9.58%
Democratic	Charles Kimbell	7,253	7.45%
Write-in		356	0.37%
Total votes		97,365	100.00%

2022 Progressive primary, Vermont lieutenant governor
Party	Candidate	Votes	%
Progressive	David Zuckerman (write-in)	118	52.44%
Write-in	Write-ins (other)	107	47.56%
Total votes		225	100.00%

2022 general election, Vermont Lieutenant Governor
Party	Candidate	Votes	%	±%
Progressive	David Zuckerman (Note: Candidate received the nominations of both the Progressive and Democratic parties and was listed on the ballot as "Progressive/Democratic" (candidate was primarily a Progressive).)	150,102	53.85%	+2.53
Republican	Joe Benning	118,724	42.60%	−1.49
Green Mountain	Ian Diamondstone	8,159	2.93%	N/A
Write-in		1,738	0.62%	+0.23
Total votes		278,723	100.00%	
Progressive gain from Democratic				

2024 Progressive primary, Vermont lieutenant governor
Party	Candidate	Votes	%
Progressive	Zoraya Hightower	257	62.08%
Progressive	Undervotes (Note: Blank ballots)	72	17.39%
Democratic	David Zuckerman (write-in)	55	13.29%
Write-in		29	7.01%
Progressive	Overvotes	1	0.24%
Total votes		414	100.00%

Democratic primary
Party	Candidate	Votes	%
Democratic	David Zuckerman (incumbent)	28,729	55.28%
Democratic	Thomas Renner	18,838	36.25%
Democratic	Undervotes	3,760	7.24%
Write-in		603	1.16%
Democratic	Overvotes	39	0.08%
Total votes		51,969	100.00%

2024 Vermont lieutenant gubernatorial election
Party	Candidate	Votes	%	±%
Republican	John Rodgers	171,854	48.76%	+6.16%
Progressive/Democratic	David Zuckerman (incumbent)	165,876	47.07%	−6.78%
Green Mountain Peace and Justice Party	Ian Diamondstone	13,671	3.88%	+0.95%
Write-in		1,013	0.29%	-0.33%
Total votes		352,414	100.00%	N/A

2024 Vermont lieutenant gubernatorial contingent election
Party	Candidate	Votes	%
Republican	John Rodgers	158	87.77%
Progressive/Democratic	David Zuckerman (incumbent)	18	10.23%
Green Mountain Peace and Justice Party	Ian Diamondstone	0	0%
Total votes		176	100.0%
Republican gain from Progressive			

== Notes ==
Political offices
Preceded by Phil Scott	Lieutenant Governor of Vermont; 2017–2021	Succeeded by Molly Gray
Preceded by Molly Gray	Lieutenant Governor of Vermont; 2023–2025	Succeeded by John S. Rodgers
Party political offices
Vacant Title last held by Cassandra Gekas	Democratic nominee for Lieutenant Governor of Vermont; 2016, 2018	Succeeded by Molly Gray
Preceded by Dean Corren	Progressive nominee for Lieutenant Governor of Vermont; 2016, 2018	Succeeded by Cris Ericson
Preceded by Christine Hallquist	Democratic nominee for Governor of Vermont; 2020	Succeeded by Brenda Siegel
Vacant Title last held by Martha Abbott	Progressive nominee for Governor of Vermont; 2020	Succeeded by Susan Hatch Davis
Preceded by Molly Gray	Democratic nominee for Lieutenant Governor of Vermont; 2022, 2024	Succeeded by Molly Gray
Preceded by Cris Ericson	Progressive nominee for Lieutenant Governor of Vermont; 2022, 2024	Most recent
