= Zoie Saunders =

American politician

Zoie Saunders is the Vermont Secretary of Education. In 2024, the Vermont Senate voted 19-9 to not confirm her as the education secretary. The governor of Vermont Phil Scott appointed her in an interim capacity to get around the rejection. In March 2025, the Vermont Senate voted 22-8 to confirm her in the role.

She is being sued for blocking a Christian school from competing in state sponsored events after it forfeited a game against a team with a trans athlete.
