= Vermont Agency of Education =

Coordinates: 44.1992859°N 72.505683°W

State Agency overview
- Jurisdiction: Vermont
- Headquarters: 1 National Life Drive, Montpelier
- Employees: 160 (2010)
- Annual budget: US $9,326,652 (FY 2017)
- State Agency executives: Daniel M. French, Ed.D, Secretary; Heather Bouchey, Ph.D., Deputy Secretary
- Parent State Agency: Vermont State Board of Education
- Website: education.vermont.gov

The Vermont Agency of Education is the governmental education agency of the U.S. state of Vermont. It is headquartered in the National Life Building in Montpelier.

== Secretary of Education ==
The secretary of education position was created in 2012 during the term of Vermont Governor Peter Shumlin. Holders of this office are:

- Armando Vilaseca (2012–2013)
- Rebecca Holcombe (2014–2018)
- Daniel M. French (2018–2023)
- Zoie Saunders (2024–present)
