= Armando Vilaseca =

American education commissioner

Armando Vilaseca was the former Commissioner of the Vermont Department of Education.

After leaving Cuba in 1964, Vilaseca settled in West New York, New Jersey, a community with a significant Cuban American community. There he attended Memorial High School.

== Career ==
Vilaseca served as a classroom schoolteacher in Georgia, Vermont, before moving on to becoming a school administrator in his role as teaching principal in Reading Elementary School. He continued in this role at Westford Elementary and Middle School, Essex High School for ten years.

He subsequently served as superintendent of the Colchester School District and of the Franklin West Supervisory Union.

Vilaseca served as a government liaison job to the nation, assisting a delegation to represent Vermont's products.

Vilaseca also is a member of the Cuban American Friendship Society.

== See also ==
- Education in Vermont
