= 2020 Vermont gubernatorial election =

- November 3, 2020
- Turnout: 73.27% ▲
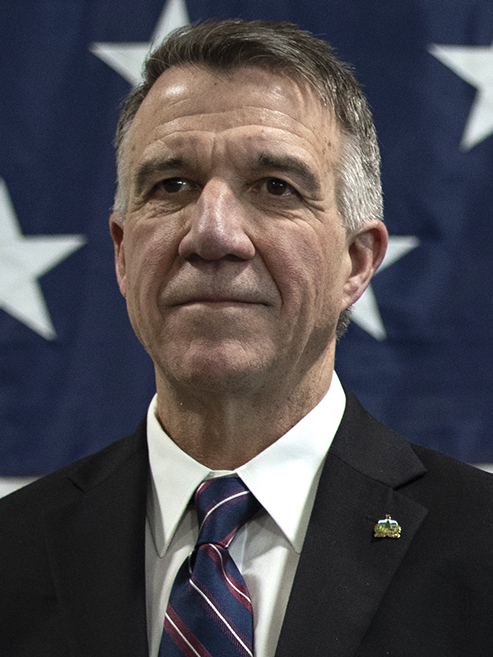

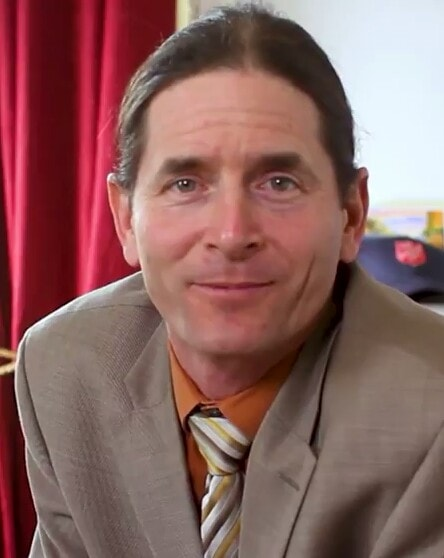
Nominee	Phil Scott	David Zuckerman
Party	Republican	Progressive
Alliance		Democratic
Popular vote	248,412	99,214
Percentage	68.49%	27.35%
- Scott: 40–50% 50–60% 60–70% 70–80% 80–90% >90% Zuckerman: 40–50% 50–60% 60–70% Tie: 50% No votes
Governor before election
Phil Scott
Republican
Elected Governor
Phil Scott
Republican

The 2020 Vermont gubernatorial election was held on November 3, 2020, to elect the governor of the U.S. state of Vermont. As Vermont does not impose term limits upon its governors, incumbent Republican governor Phil Scott was eligible to run for re-election to a third two-year term in office. On November 18, 2019, he confirmed that he was running for reelection, but did not yet publicly announce his campaign. On May 28, 2020, he officially announced his candidacy but stated that he would not campaign, maintain a campaign staff, or fundraise because of the state of emergency due to the COVID-19 pandemic in Vermont. The primary was held on August 11. Scott won re-election to a third term in a landslide, defeating Progressive and Democratic nominee, Lieutenant Governor David Zuckerman.

Scott's 41-point victory margin was the largest in a Vermont gubernatorial election since 1996 and the largest for a Republican candidate since 1950, even while Democrat Joe Biden carried the state by a more than the 35-point margin in the concurrent presidential election, which was his strongest performance in the nation. Scott would improve upon his performance again in 2022 and 2024.

== Republican primary ==
=== Candidates ===
==== Nominee ====
- Phil Scott, incumbent governor of Vermont

==== Eliminated in primary ====
- Douglas Cavett
- John Klar, lawyer and pastor
- Bernard Peters, independent candidate for governor in 2014 and for state representative in 1986
- Emily Peyton, independent candidate for governor in 2012 and 2014, Liberty Union nominee for governor in 2018

=== Results ===
Results by county: Scott—80–90% Scott—70–80% Scott—60–70%

Republican primary results
Party	Candidate	Votes	%
Republican	Phil Scott (incumbent)	42,275	72.67%
Republican	John Klar	12,762	21.94%
Republican	Emily Peyton	970	1.67%
Republican	Douglas Cavett	966	1.66%
Republican	Bernard Peters	772	1.33%
Republican	Write-ins	426	0.73%
Total votes		58,171	100.0%

== Democratic primary ==
=== Candidates ===
==== Nominee ====
- David Zuckerman, Lieutenant Governor of Vermont (Note: Zuckerman is a member of the Progressive Party but also runs in Democratic primaries.) (Zuckerman elected to use the Progressive Party ballot line in the general election, listing the Democratic Party as a secondary nomination under Vermont's electoral fusion system.)

==== Eliminated in primary ====
- Ralph "Carcajou" Corbo, former Rural Carrier for USPS, activist, and candidate for Vermont's at-large congressional district in 2020
- Rebecca Holcombe, former Vermont Education Secretary
- Patrick Winburn, attorney

==== Declined ====
- T. J. Donovan, Attorney General of Vermont (running for re-election)
- Christine Hallquist, former CEO of the Vermont Electric Cooperative and nominee for governor in 2018

=== Endorsements ===
Rebecca Holcombe

State officials

- Madeleine Kunin, former governor (1985-1991)

Party chairs

- Dottie Deans, former Vermont Democratic Party chair

Organizations

- EMILY's List
David Zuckerman

Federal officials

- Bernie Sanders, U.S. senator from Vermont

Individuals

- Ben Cohen, co-founder of Ben & Jerry's
- Jerry Greenfield, co-founder of Ben & Jerry's
- Bill McKibben, environmentalist, scholar at Middlebury College, and leader of 350.org

=== Debates & forums ===
- CCTV Channel 17 Town Meeting TV - Democratic Primary Gubernatorial Forum 7/16/2020
- Brattleboro Community TV - Democratic Governor Candidate Debate 5/11/2020

=== Results ===
Results by county: Zuckerman—50–60% Zuckerman—40–50% Zuckerman—30–40% Holcombe—40–50%

Democratic primary results
Party	Candidate	Votes	%
Democratic	David Zuckerman	48,150	47.56%
Democratic	Rebecca Holcombe	37,599	37.14%
Democratic	Patrick Winburn	7,662	7.57%
Democratic	Ralph Corbo	1,288	1.27%
Democratic	Write-ins	6,533	6.45%
Total votes		101,232	100.0%

== Progressive Party ==
Leaders within the Progressive Party endorsed David Zuckerman for the gubernatorial election, advocating for Zuckerman to be elected with write-in voters. The party has stated that if Cris Ericson won the primary, "they would likely issue a 'non-endorsement.'" On election night the progressive nomination was listed as too close to call. Zuckerman was confirmed to have won the nomination a few days later when the final write-in vote count was confirmed.

=== Nominee ===
- David Zuckerman, Lieutenant Governor of Vermont, former member of the Vermont Senate, former member of the Vermont House of Representatives, farmer, businessman, environmentalist

=== Eliminated in primary ===
- Cris Ericson, marijuana legalization activist, perennial candidate; also ran for other statewide offices
- Boots Wardinski, Liberty Union nominee for lieutenant governor in 2016

=== Results ===
Progressive primary results
Party	Candidate	Votes	%
Progressive	David Zuckerman (write-in)	273	32.62%
Progressive	Cris Ericson	254	30.35%
Progressive	Boots Wardinski	239	28.55%
Progressive	Phil Scott (write-in)	41	4.90%
Progressive	Write-ins (other)	30	3.58%
Total votes		837	100.0%

== General election ==
=== Candidates ===
- Wayne Billado III (I), also ran for lieutenant governor, state senator for Franklin County, and state representative for Franklin 3-1
- Michael A. Devost (I)
- Charly Dickerson (I)
- Kevin Hoyt (I), Republican nominee for state representative for Bennington 2–1 in 2018
- Emily Peyton (I), candidate for governor in 2012, 2014, and 2018
- Phil Scott (R), incumbent governor, former lieutenant governor and state senator, construction company owner
- Erynn Hazlett Whitney (I)
- David Zuckerman (P/D), lieutenant governor, former member of State Legislature, farmer, businessman, environmentalist

=== Predictions ===
Source	Ranking	As of
Inside Elections	Safe R	October 28, 2020
270toWin	Safe R	November 2, 2020
Sabato's Crystal Ball	Safe R	November 2, 2020
The Cook Political Report	Safe R	October 23, 2020
Politico	Likely R	November 2, 2020
RCP	Likely R	November 2, 2020
Daily Kos	Safe R	October 28, 2020

=== Polling ===
Poll source	Date(s) administered	Sample size (Note: Key: A – all adults RV – registered voters LV – likely voters V – unclear)	Margin of error	Phil Scott (R)	David Zuckerman (P/D)	Other / Undecided
Braun Research	September 3–15, 2020	582 (LV)	± 4%	55%	24%	17% (Note: "Other/not sure/no opinion" with 16%; "No one/not voting on this item" with 1%; Billado (I), Devot (I), Dickerson (I), Hoyt (I), "refused" and Whitney (I) with 0%)
We Ask America	June 2–3, 2020	500 (LV)	± 4.4%	60%	25%	15%
Braun Research	February 4–10, 2020	603 (RV)	± 4.0%	52%	29%	19%

Hypothetical polling

with Rebecca Holcombe

Poll source	Date(s) administered	Sample size	Margin of error	Phil Scott (R)	Rebecca Holcombe (D)	Other / Undecided
We Ask America	June 2–3, 2020	500 (LV)	± 4.4%	62%	20%	18%
Braun Research/VPR	February 4–10, 2020	603 (RV)	± 4.0%	55%	20%	26%

=== Endorsements ===
David Zuckerman (P/D)

Federal officials

- Bernie Sanders, U.S. senator from Vermont, candidate for the Democratic nomination for president in 2020

State politicians

- Tim Ashe, Senate president pro tempore, candidate for lieutenant governor in 2020
- Christopher Pearson, state senator
- Anthony Pollina, state senator, Progressive minority leader
- Brenda Siegel, candidate for lieutenant governor in 2020, candidate for governor in 2018

Individuals

- Ben Cohen, co-founder of Ben & Jerry's
- Howard Dean, former Vermont governor
- Jerry Greenfield, co-founder of Ben & Jerry's
- Madeleine Kunin, former Vermont governor
- Bill McKibben, environmentalist, scholar at Middlebury College, and leader of 350.org
- Peter Shumlin, former Vermont governor

Organizations

- Our Revolution
- Rights & Democracy VT
- Sunrise Vermont

=== Debates and forums ===
- VTDigger Governor Forum 9/29/2020

=== Results ===
2020 Vermont gubernatorial election
Party	Candidate	Votes	%	±%
Republican	Phil Scott (incumbent)	248,412	68.49%	+13.30
Progressive	David Zuckerman	99,214	27.35%	N/A
Independent	Kevin Hoyt	4,576	1.26%	N/A
Independent	Emily Peyton	3,505	0.97%	N/A
Independent	Erynn Hazlett Whitney	1,777	0.49%	N/A
Independent	Wayne Billado III	1,431	0.39%	N/A
Independent	Michael A. Devost	1,160	0.32%	N/A
Independent	Charly Dickerson	1,037	0.29%	N/A
Write-in		1,599	0.44%	N/A
Total votes		362,711	100.0%	+32.33
Rejected ballots		8,257	2.23%	
Turnout		370,968	73.27%	
Registered electors		506,312		
Republican hold				

==== By county ====
By county

County	Phil Scott Republican		David Zuckerman Progressive		Kevin Hoyt Independent		Various candidates Other parties		Write-in		Margin		Total votes
County	#	%	#	%	#	%	#	%	#	%	#	%	Total votes
Addison	15,034	68.75	6,218	28.44	125	0.57	405	1.85	85	0.39	8,816	40.32	21,867
Bennington	12,053	60.24	5,846	29.22	1,313	6.56	733	3.66	62	0.31	6,207	31.02	20,007
Caledonia	11,701	73.25	3,471	21.73	224	1.40	475	2.97	102	0.64	8,230	51.52	15,973
Chittenden	64,912	66.50	30,541	31.29	402	0.41	1,499	1.54	261	0.27	34,371	35.21	97,615
Essex	2,408	75.70	551	17.32	62	1.95	135	4.24	25	0.79	1,857	58.38	3,181
Franklin	20,095	78.35	4,251	16.57	268	1.04	908	3.54	127	0.50	15,844	61.77	25,649
Grand Isle	3,755	77.84	924	19.15	26	0.54	111	2.30	8	0.17	2,831	58.69	4,824
Lamoille	10,695	72.19	3,639	24.56	103	0.70	297	2.00	82	0.55	7,056	47.62	14,816
Orange	12,174	71.62	4,132	24.31	222	1.31	379	2.23	92	0.54	8,042	47.31	16,999
Orleans	10,291	74.30	2,690	19.42	252	1.82	478	3.45	140	1.01	7,601	54.88	13,851
Rutland	24,588	73.33	7,129	21.26	582	1.74	944	2.82	287	0.86	17,459	52.07	33,530
Washington	24,188	69.08	9,833	28.08	247	0.71	604	1.72	144	0.41	14,355	41.00	35,016
Windham	13,781	54.05	10,308	40.43	334	1.31	1,021	4.00	55	0.22	3,473	13.62	25,499
Windsor	22,737	67.10	9,681	28.57	416	1.23	921	2.72	129	0.38	13,056	38.53	33,884
Totals	248,412	68.49	99,214	27.35	4,576	1.26	8,910	2.46	1,599	0.44	149,198	41.13	362,711

Counties that flipped from Democratic to Republican

- Windham (largest municipality: Brattleboro)
