= Charles Kimbell =

American politician and member of the Vermont State House of Representatives

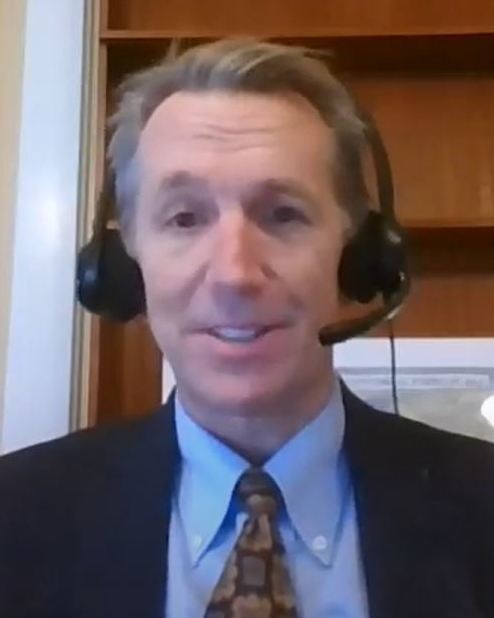
- Kimbell in 2021

Member of the Vermont House of Representatives from the 5th Windsor district
- Incumbent
- Assumed office January 8, 2025
- Preceded by: Tesha Buss
- In office January 11, 2017 – January 4, 2023
- Preceded by: Alison H. Clarkson
- Succeeded by: Tesha Buss

Personal details
- Born: Boston, Massachusetts, U.S.
- Party: Democratic
- Children: 3
- Education: University of Vermont (BA)

Charles Kimbell is an American politician who has served in the Vermont House of Representatives since 2025. In 2004, he ran for Windsor County Senate as a Republican. He won the primary but lost the general election. He previously served in the Vermont House from 2017 to 2023 and was a candidate for Lieutenant Governor of Vermont in 2022, but lost the primary to David Zuckerman in August 2022.

== Career ==
Kimbell announced his campaign for the Democratic lieutenant gubernatorial nomination on January 3, 2022.
