= Dean Corren =

American politician and scientist (1955–2023)

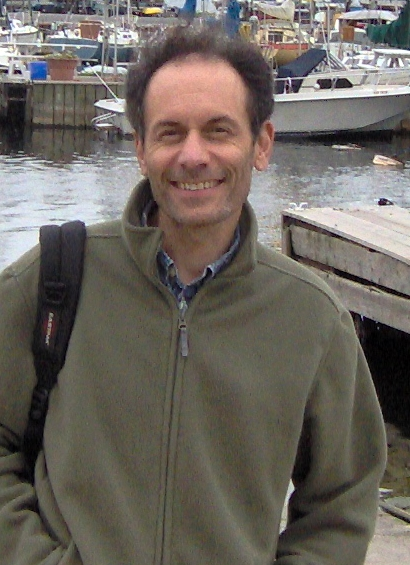

Member of the Vermont House of Representatives from the Chittenden 7-3 district
- In office 1993–2001 Serving with: Sandy Baird (1993–1997); David Zuckerman (1997–2001)
- Preceded by: Multi-member district
- Succeeded by: Multi-member district

Personal details
- Born: May 16, 1955 New York City, U.S.
- Died: May 2, 2023 (aged 67) Vermont, U.S.
- Party: Democratic; Independent; Progressive
- Spouses: Karen Amirault; Cindy Wolkin
- Children: 1
- Education: Middlebury College (BA); New York University (MS)

Dean Russel Corren (May 16, 1955 – May 2, 2023) was an American politician and scientist who served in the Vermont House of Representatives from the Chittenden 7-3 district from 1993 to 2000, as an independent and member of the Progressive Coalition. He unsuccessfully ran for lieutenant governor of Vermont in 2014. Corren was the third member of the Progressive Party elected to the state legislature.

Corren was born in New York City, and educated at Middlebury College and New York University. He was appointed to serve on the Electric Commission in Burlington, Vermont, in 1988, by the Republican and Progressive members of the city council against the wishes of the Democratic members despite Corren being a Democrat.

Corren ran for a seat in the state house in the 1990 election, but was defeated. He was elected to the state house as an independent in the 1992 election and reelected in the 1994 election. He was reelected to the state house in the 1996 and 1998 elections as a member of the Progressive Coalition. Corren ran for lieutenant governor of Vermont in the 2014 election with the nominations of the Democratic and Progressive parties, but was defeated by Republican nominee Phil Scott.

== Early life and education ==
Dean Russel Corren was born on May 16, 1955, in New York City. He was raised in Katonah, New York, and moved to Burlington, Vermont in 1988. Corren graduated from Middlebury College with a bachelor's degree in philosophy in 1977, and later graduated with a master's degree in energy science from New York University.

Corren married Karen Amirault and Cindy Wolkin, and had one son. He was Jewish.

== Career ==
=== Local politics ===
In 1988, the Democratic member of the city council in Burlington, Vermont, wanted to appoint Richard Frothingham to the Electric Commission, but the Republican and Progressive members of the city council instead appointed Corren, who was also a member of the Democratic Party. Allen Gear, a Republican member of the city council, stated that they thought it did not matter what person was appointed to the commission as long as that person was a member of the Democratic Party. Nancy Chioffi, a Democratic member of the city council who also served as its president, stated that the "Democrats were not asking for much, and they didn't get anything" following Corren's appointment. Corren later became chair of the Electric Commission. He was appointed to serve another three-year term on the council in 1991.

Corren supported Peter Clavelle during the 1993 Burlington mayoral election.

=== Vermont House of Representatives ===
==== Elections ====
Corren considered running for a seat in the Vermont House of Representatives from the Chittenden 7-3 district in the 1990 election as either an independent or Progressive Coalition candidate. He chose to run as an independent candidate, but was defeated by Democratic nominees Hamilton E. Davis and Alice Cook Bassett while coming ahead of Republican nominee June Trono. A recount was conducted and maintained Davis and Bassett's victory. During the campaign he was endorsed by the Rainbow Coalition and accused Davis, the chair of the Vermont Hospital Data Council, of using a press conference for political purposes.

Corren ran as an independent candidate in the 1992 election and was elected alongside Democratic nominee Sandy Baird and both were reelected in the 1994 election. He ran with the nomination of the Progressive Coalition in the 1996 election and won reelection alongside David Zuckerman, another member of the Progressive Coalition, and both were reelected in 1998. Corren chose to not seek reelection in the 2000 election while Zuckerman was reelected alongside Bob Kiss.

==== Tenure ====
During Corren's tenure in the state house he served on the Government Operations committee. When he joined the state house Corren was aligned with the Progressive Coalition caucus which included representatives Terry Bouricius and Tom Smith. In 1996, he sponsored legislation to impeach Judge Althea Kroger, accusing her of lying under oath and making false accusation against Judge Elizabeth Gretkowski.

=== Lieutenant gubernatorial campaign ===
Corren announced on May 7, 2014, that he would run for Lieutenant Governor of Vermont with the Progressive nomination. He qualified for public campaign funds, with $50,000 in the primary and $150,000 in the general election, after raising over $18,000 with contributions below $50 which was more than the $15,000 required. On August 16, Corren launched his campaign at an event hosted by Jerry Greenfield and Ben Cohen. Corren won the Democratic primary without opposition and the Progressive primary as a write-in candidate. The Vermont Democratic State Committee voted thirty-one to four in favor of endorsing Corren on September 20, although the party did not give him access to voter lists. He participated in a debate against Republican nominee Phil Scott and Liberty Union nominee Marina Brown. Scott defeated Corren in the general election. Corren considered running for lieutenant governor or governor in the 2016 election, but chose not to.

Corren's campaign sent out a text message asking for people to vote for him using a list of people that included those who had not opted in to receive the message which was illegal. In 2015, William Sorrell, the Vermont Attorney General, filed a lawsuit against Corren with $72,000 in penalties alleging that he had violated campaign financing laws by asking for the Democratic Party to send an email supporting him to their 19,000 member list. T. J. Donovan succeeded Sorrell as attorney general and dismissed the charges against Corren stating that it would be unfair to continue the prosecution and the chilling effect it had on candidates seeking public campaign financing.

== Death ==
Corren died from a cardiac event on May 2, 2023.

== Political positions ==
Corren voted in favor of legislation to prohibit smoking in public areas. In 1993, the state house voted eighty to fifty-six, with Corren against, in favor of a one percent sales tax increase suggested by Howard Dean. He opposed the North American Free Trade Agreement and attempted to have a majority of the Vermont legislature go on record against the treaty. He supported the creation of a single-payer healthcare. The state house voted seventy-nine to sixty-eight, with Corren in favor, in favor of allowing civil unions for same-sex couples.

== Electoral history ==
Dean Corren electoral history

1990 Vermont House of Representatives Chittenden 7-3 District election
Party	Candidate	Votes	%
Democratic	Hamilton E. Davis (incumbent)	958	28.45%
Democratic	Alice Cook Bassett	933	27.71%
Independent	Dean Corren	924	27.44%
Republican	June Trono	537	15.95%
Write-in		15	0.45%
Total votes		3,367	100.00%

1992 Vermont House of Representatives Chittenden 7-3 District election
Party	Candidate	Votes	%
Independent	Dean Corren	2,288	34.65%
Democratic	Sandy Baird	1,826	27.65%
Independent	Jim Court	1,420	21.51%
Democratic	Dan Mallar	1,069	16.19%
Total votes		6,603	100.00%

1994 Vermont House of Representatives Chittenden 7-3 District election
Party	Candidate	Votes	%
Independent	Dean Corren (incumbent)	1,141	25.49%
Democratic	Sandy Baird (incumbent)	1,101	24.60%
Progressive Coalition	David Zuckerman	1,042	23.28%
Democratic	Marcy J. Kaplan	1,017	22.72%
Natural Law	Chelsea Clark	94	2.10%
Natural Law	Edward S. Harris	81	1.81%
Total votes		4,476	100.00%

1996 Vermont House of Representatives Chittenden 7-3 District election
Party	Candidate	Votes	%
Progressive Coalition	David Zuckerman	1,995	36.38%
Progressive Coalition	Dean Corren (incumbent)	1,988	36.25%
Democratic	Scott Baldwin	1,428	26.04%
Write-in		73	1.33%
Total votes		5,484	100.00%

1998 Vermont House of Representatives Chittenden 7-3 District election
Party	Candidate	Votes	%
Progressive Coalition	David Zuckerman (incumbent)	1,021	47.51%
Progressive Coalition	Dean Corren (incumbent)	1,010	47.00%
Write-in		118	5.49%
Total votes		2,149	100.00%

2014 Vermont lieutenant gubernatorial Democratic primary
Party	Candidate	Votes	%
Democratic	Dean Corren	6,405	100.00%
Total votes		6,405	100.00%
	Blank	15,201	

2014 Vermont lieutenant gubernatorial Progressive primary
Party	Candidate	Votes	%
Progressive	Dean Corren	284	94.35%
Write-in		17	5.65%
Total votes		301	100.00%
	Blank	77	

2014 Vermont lieutenant gubernatorial election
Party	Candidate	Votes	%
Republican	Phil Scott (incumbent)	118,949	62.16%
Progressive	Dean Corren	69,005	36.06%
Liberty Union	Marina Brown	3,347	1.75%
Write-in		60	0.03%
Total votes		191,361	100.00%
	Blank	2,383	

Party political offices
Preceded by Cassandra Gekas	Progressive nominee for Lieutenant Governor of Vermont; 2014	Succeeded by David Zuckerman
