= John S. Rodgers =

American politician (born 1965)

John Rodgers
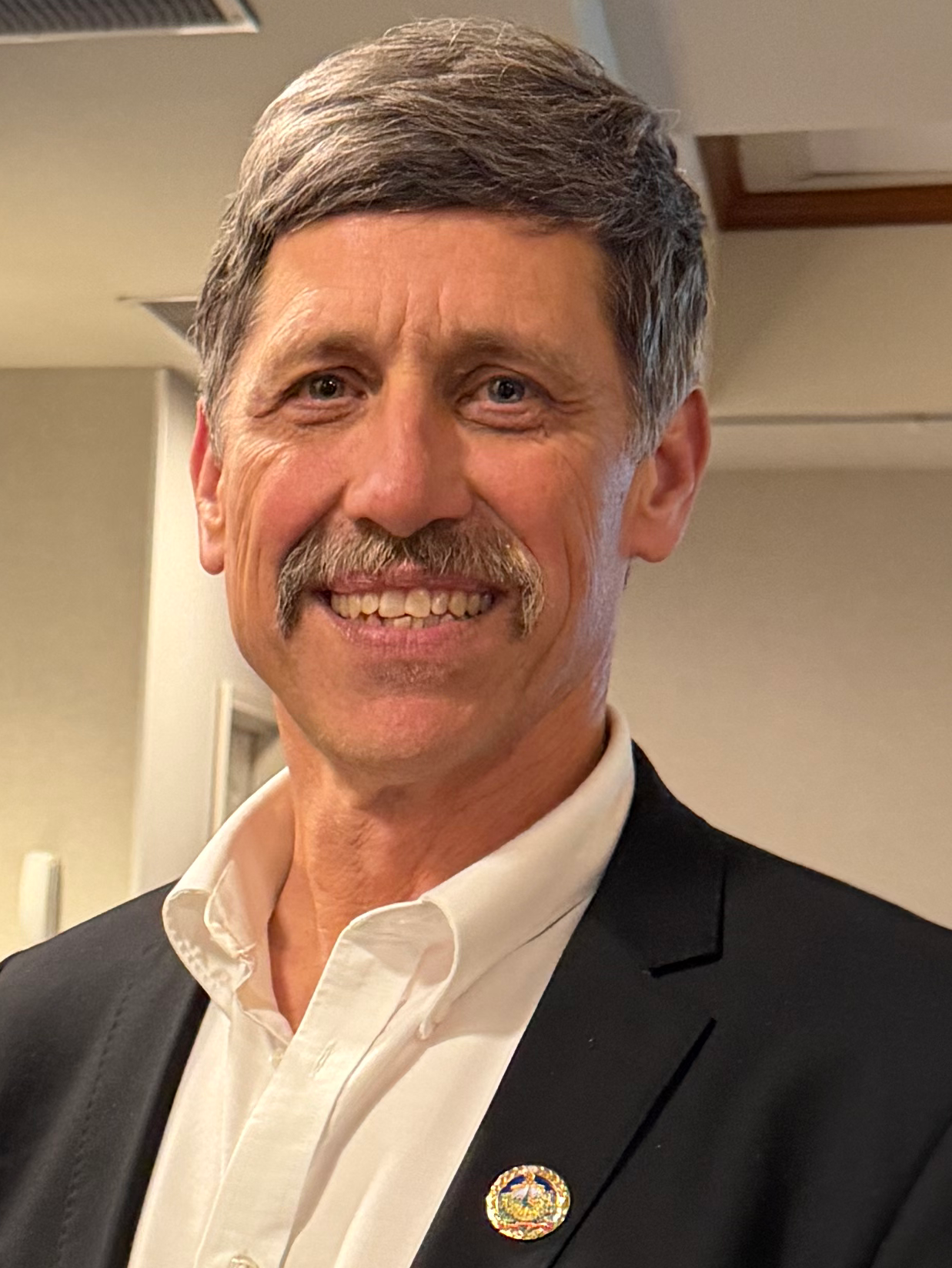
- Rodgers in 2026

85th Lieutenant Governor of Vermont
- Incumbent
- Assumed office January 9, 2025
- Governor: Phil Scott
- Preceded by: David Zuckerman

Member of the Vermont Senate from the Essex-Orleans district
- In office January 9, 2013 – January 6, 2021
- Preceded by: Vincent Illuzzi
- Succeeded by: Russ Ingalls

Member of the Vermont House of Representatives from the Orleans-Caledonia 1st district district
- In office January 8, 2003 – January 5, 2011
- Preceded by: David Hathaway
- Succeeded by: Vicki Strong

Personal details
- Born: July 29, 1965 (age 61) St. Johnsbury, Vermont, U.S.
- Party: Democratic (before 2024); Republican (2024–present)
- Education: New Hampshire Vocational Technical College (attended)

John Scott Rodgers (born July 29, 1965) is an American politician and farmer serving as the 85th lieutenant governor of Vermont since 2025. He previously served in the Vermont Senate from the Essex-Orleans district from 2013 to 2021 and in the Vermont House of Representatives from the Orleans-Caledonia 1 district from 2003 to 2011. He received a plurality of the vote in the 2024 Vermont lieutenant gubernatorial election but fell short of a majority, leaving it to the Vermont General Assembly to decide the election. He ran for reelection in 2026 and lost to former Vermont lieutenant governor Molly Gray, in a landslide 37.1% to 62.8.

A member of the Democratic Party until 2024, Rodgers now considers himself a moderate Republican.

== Early life and education ==
Rodgers was born in St. Johnsbury, Vermont and raised on his family's dairy farm in Glover, Vermont, where he still lives.

He completed his education at Sacred Heart School in Newport, Vermont in 1983. In 1985, he earned an Associate's Degree from New Hampshire Vocational Technical College in Berlin, New Hampshire. Following his graduation, Rodgers established JS Rodgers Masonry Inc., a construction business focused on dry stone masonry and excavation work.

== Career ==
As a representative of the rural and relatively conservative Northeast Kingdom, Rodgers held some stances on issues that were at odds with the Democratic Party, which he was a member of until 2024. Most notably, he is a vocal gun control opponent and was one of the most visible opponents of S.55, the first major gun control bill passed in Vermont.

He ran as a write-in candidate in the Democratic primary for Governor of Vermont in 2018.

In 2020, Rodgers proposed a bill that would have banned cell phone use by people under the age of 21.

=== 2024 lieutenant gubernatorial election ===
In May 2024, Rodgers declared his candidacy for lieutenant governor, challenging incumbent David Zuckerman. He became the Republican nominee on August 13, and was endorsed by incumbent Republican Governor Phil Scott. Rodgers considers himself a moderate Republican, and said prior to the 2024 election that he would not vote for Republican presidential nominee Donald Trump.

On November 5, he received a plurality of the vote against Zuckerman, with an initial estimate of 46.2% to 44.6%. Green Mountain Peace and Justice Party nominee Ian Diamondstone finished third with 3.7% percent of the vote.

Because the Constitution of Vermont requires a majority vote for election as lieutenant governor, the Vermont General Assembly voted on January 9, 2025 to determine the winner. Zuckerman conceded the election on November 7, 2024, but did not declare whether he would contest the January legislative election. Although the General Assembly has voted to ratify the winner of the popular vote since 1976, Diamondstone urged the General Assembly to elect Zuckerman on the grounds that a majority of voters supported the two more liberal candidates in the race. In conceding the popular vote, Zuckerman expressed agreement with Diamondstone's argument and said he would "point out those facts" to the legislators, though he said he would not make a "strong effort" on his own behalf and "[didn't] think [the Assembly was] going to decide to do that". On January 9, Rodgers was officially elected as the 85th lieutenant governor by a vote of 158 to 18 and sworn into office.

== Personal life ==
Rodgers lives on a farm which has been in his family for over 200 years. He runs a cannabis farm.

Party political offices
Preceded by Joe Benning	Republican nominee for Lieutenant Governor of Vermont; 2024, 2026	Most recent
Political offices
Preceded by David Zuckerman	Lieutenant Governor of Vermont; 2025–present	Incumbent
