= Phil Scott =

Governor of Vermont since 2017

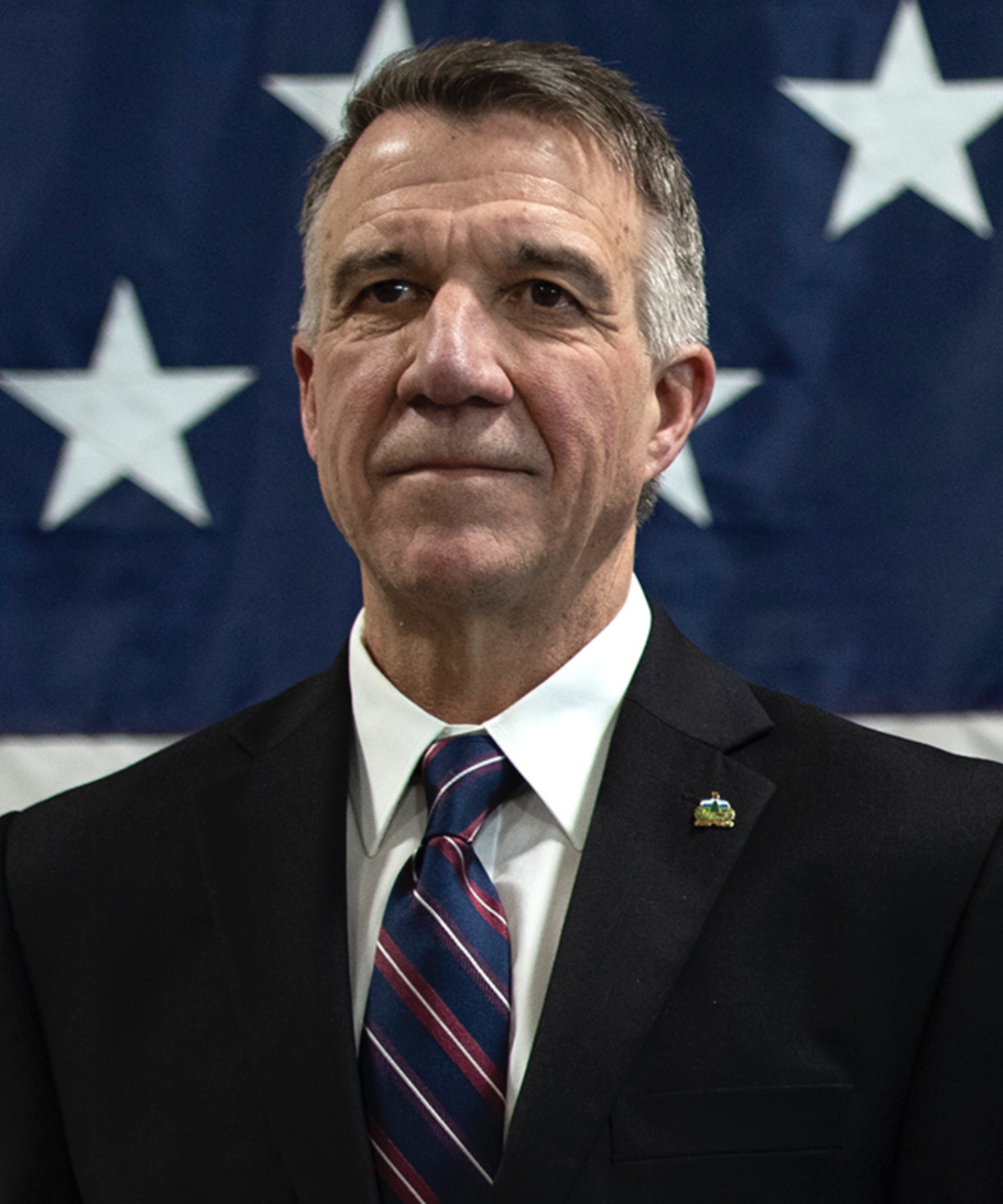
- Scott in 2019

82nd Governor of Vermont
- Incumbent
- Assumed office January 5, 2017
- Lieutenant: David Zuckerman; Molly Gray; David Zuckerman; John Rodgers; Molly Gray (elect)
- Preceded by: Peter Shumlin

81st Lieutenant Governor of Vermont
- In office January 6, 2011 – January 5, 2017
- Governor: Peter Shumlin
- Preceded by: Brian Dubie
- Succeeded by: David Zuckerman

Member of the Vermont Senate from the Washington district
- In office January 5, 2001 – January 5, 2011 Serving with Bill Doyle, Ann Cummings
- Preceded by: Jeb Spaulding
- Succeeded by: Anthony Pollina

Personal details
- Born: Philip Brian Scott; August 4, 1958 (age 68) Barre, Vermont, U.S.
- Party: Republican
- Spouses: Jane Manosh (m. 1982, divorced) Angela Wright (m. 1999, divorced) Diana McTeague (m. 2011)
- Children: 2
- Education: University of Vermont (BS)
- Website: Office website Campaign website
- Scott's voice Scott on the COVID-19 pandemic in Vermont; Recorded April 9, 2020

Philip Brian Scott (born August 4, 1958) is an American politician, stock car racer, and businessman who has served since 2017 as the 82nd governor of Vermont. A member of the Republican Party, he was a representative for the Washington District in the Vermont Senate from 2001 to 2011 and the 81st lieutenant governor of Vermont from 2011 to 2017.

Scott was first elected governor of Vermont in 2016, and was reelected in 2018, 2020, 2022, 2024, and 2026. Scott's 2024 margin of victory is the largest in any Vermont gubernatorial election since 1946. Beginning in 2027, Scott will be the longest-serving incumbent governor in the United States. If Scott finishes his sixth term in January 2029, he will also be the longest-serving governor in Vermont history.

Scott is often described as a moderate Republican or a liberal Republican. While according to the Cook Partisan Voting Index, Vermont is the most Democratic-leaning U.S. state (D+17), Scott has consistently ranked as the nation's most popular governor.

== Early life ==
Philip B. Scott was born on August 4, 1958, in Barre, Vermont, the son of Marian (Beckley) and Howard Roy Scott (1914–1969). His father was disabled after being wounded while serving in World War II and later worked as a vehicle permit supervisor for the state highway department. In 1973, Scott's mother married Robert F. Dubois (1919–1983).

Scott graduated from Barre's Spaulding High School in 1976. Scott is a 1980 graduate of the University of Vermont, where he received a Bachelor of Science degree in industrial education.

== Business career ==
After graduating from high school, Scott began working at DuBois Construction, a Middlesex business founded by the brother of his mother's second husband. After college, Scott owned a motorcycle sales and repair shop in Morrisville, then worked as a construction manager for Morrisville's H. A. Manosh Corporation. Scott has also been involved in other business ventures, including ownership of a restaurant and a nightclub.

Scott became a co-owner of DuBois Construction in 1986. He is a past president of the Associated General Contractors of Vermont. On January 6, 2012, a fire at DuBois Construction caused substantial damage, but the owners rebuilt and continued operations.

After being elected governor, Scott sold his share of DuBois Construction to avoid possible conflicts of interest, since DuBois Construction does business with the State of Vermont. He sold his 50% share for $2.5 million plus 3% interest, payable over 15 years. Scott said he opted to finance the sale himself rather than having the company borrow the money to pay him in full to preserve the company's bonding capacity. Critics suggested that Scott's sale of his share in the company over 15 years did not eliminate possible conflicts of interest, but Scott and the attorney who negotiated the sale on his behalf disagreed.

In October 2018, the state ethics commission issued an advisory opinion that Scott did have a conflict of interest because of his continued connection to the company. In September 2019, the commission withdrew the opinion, with its executive director saying that the process for receiving the complaint and investigating and issuing the opinion had been flawed. In February 2022, DuBois executives said they had reached an agreement to sell the company to Barrett Trucking of Burlington. The sale's terms were not disclosed, including whether Scott would receive a lump sum or installment payments, but DuBois representatives said the company's obligation to Scott would be met.

== Political career ==
=== Vermont Senate ===
A Republican, Scott was elected to the Vermont Senate in 2000, one of three at-large senators representing the Washington County Senate district. He was reelected four times, and was in office from 2001 to 2011. During his Senate career, he was vice chair of the Transportation Committee and chaired the Institutions Committee. He also was a member of the Natural Resources and Energy Committee. As chair of the Institutions Committee, Scott redesigned the Vermont State House cafeteria to increase efficiency.

During his time in the Senate, Scott was on several special committees, including the Judicial Nominating Board, the Legislative Advisory Committee on the State House, the Joint Oversight Corrections Committee, and the Legislative Council Committee.

=== Lieutenant governor ===
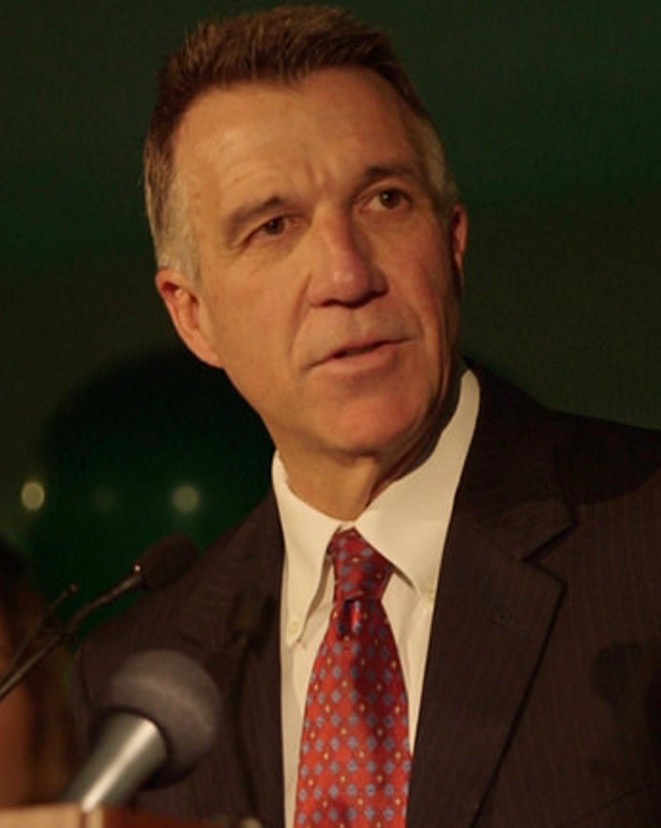
Scott in 2016

On November 2, 2010, Scott was elected the 81st lieutenant governor of Vermont, defeating Steven Howard. He took office on January 6, 2011. He was reelected in 2012, defeating Cassandra Gekas, and in 2014, defeating Dean Corren.

As lieutenant governor, Scott presided over the Vermont Senate during its sessions. In addition, he was a member of the Committee on Committees, the three-member panel that determines Senate committee assignments and appoints committee chairs and vice chairs. In the event of a tie vote, Scott was tasked with casting a tie-breaking vote. He also was acting governor when the governor was out of state.

As a state senator and lieutenant governor, Scott was active with a number of community service projects. In 2005, he founded the Wheels for Warmth program, which buys used car tires and resells safe ones, with the profits going to heating fuel assistance programs in Vermont.

==== Job approval as lieutenant governor ====
In September 2015, Scott maintained high name recognition and favorability among Vermonters. The Castleton University Polling Institute found that more than three-quarters of Vermonters knew who he was, and that of those who were able to identify him, 70% viewed him favorably. Despite his being a Republican, the same poll found that 59% of self-identified Democrats held a favorable view of Scott, while only 15% held an unfavorable view of him.

==== National Lieutenant Governors Association ====
Scott was an active member of the National Lieutenant Governors Association (NLGA), and was on the NLGA's executive committee and the NLGA's finance committee. As a member of the NLGA, he joined fellow lieutenant governors across the country in two bipartisan letters opposing proposed cuts to the Army National Guard in 2014 and 2015. Scott was a lead sponsor of an NLGA resolution to develop a long-term vision for surface transportation in the U.S. He also co-sponsored resolutions to recognize the importance of arts and culture in tourism to the U.S. economy, to support Science, Technology, Engineering, and Mathematics (STEM) education, to support designating a National Arts in Education Week, and to support a comprehensive system to end homelessness among U.S. veterans.

== Governor of Vermont ==
=== 2016 gubernatorial campaign ===
In September 2015, Scott announced his candidacy for Vermont governor.

An early 2016 poll commissioned by Vermont Public Radio and conducted by the Castleton University Polling Institute found that of the two candidates for the Republican nomination for governor, Scott was preferred by 42% of respondents compared to 4% for Bruce Lisman. A poll commissioned by Energy Independent Vermont in late June 2016 indicated that Scott had the support of 68% of Republicans to Lisman's 23%.

On May 8, 2016, Scott was endorsed by nearly all of Vermont's Republican legislators. He did not support Donald Trump in the 2016 presidential campaign.

On August 9, Scott defeated Lisman in the primary election by 21 percentage points. He defeated Sue Minter, the Democratic nominee, in the November general election by 8.7 percentage points.

=== Governorship ===
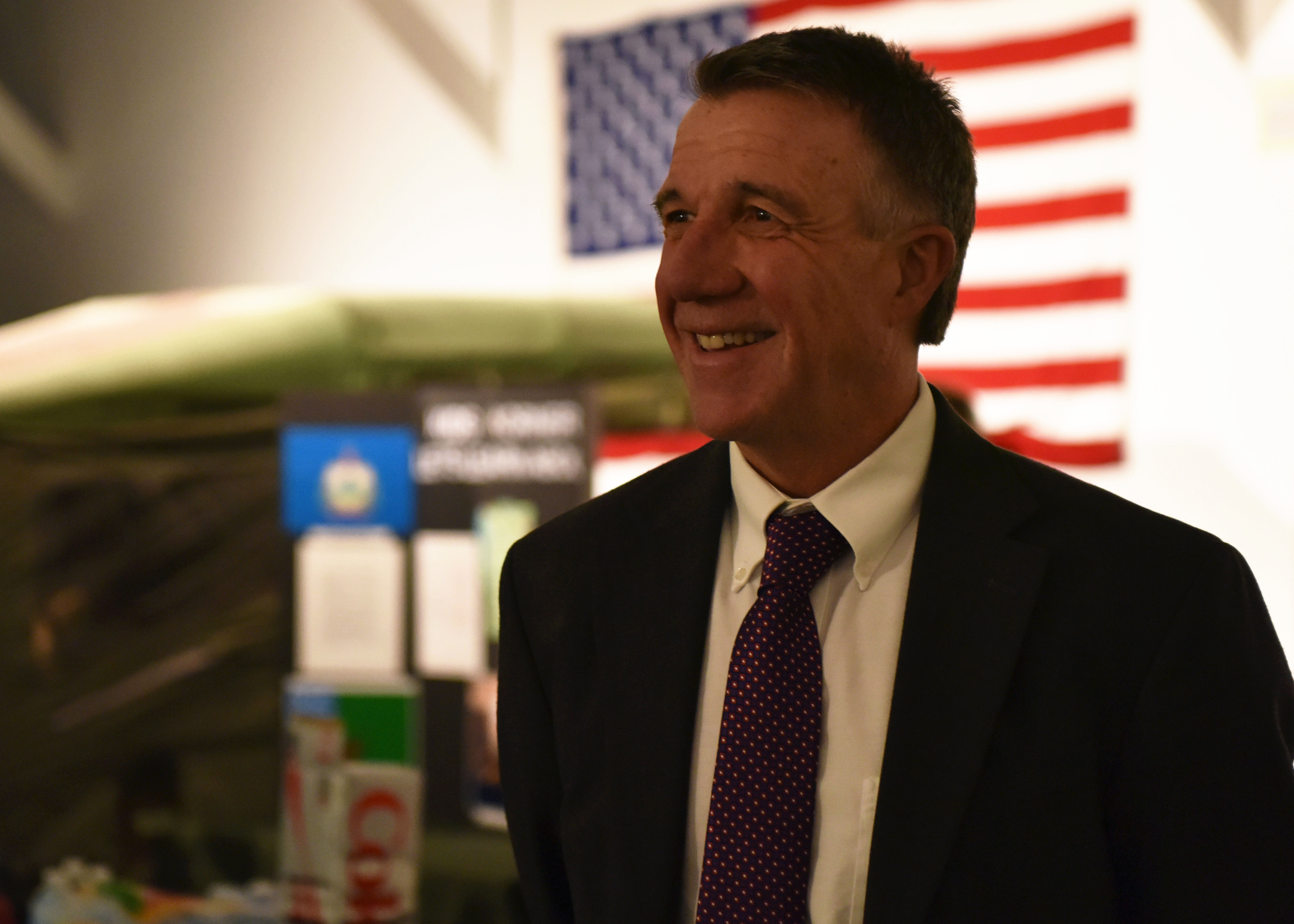
Scott in 2017

==== Fraud case settlement ====
On April 13, 2017, Scott announced a $150 million settlement with Raymond James Financial, Inc. as part of resolving fraud allegations by contractors and investors related to the Jay Peak and Burke Mountain EB-5 developments.

==== Job approval ====
According to an October 2017 Morning Consult poll, Scott's approval rating stood at 60%, making him the 7th most popular governor in the country. The poll was conducted between July 1 and September 30, 2017, and had a margin of error of 4%. In April 2018, another Morning Consult poll found that Scott's approval rating had risen to 65%, making him the 4th most popular governor in the country. His favorability ratings fell to 52% by May 2018, and to 47% by July, marking the largest decrease in popularity for any governor in the nation. By April 2019, Scott's approval rating had recovered to 59%, with a 28% disapproval rating, making him the 5th most popular governor in the country, with a net approval of 31%.

== Political positions ==
Scott has been called a moderate, as well as a liberal Republican. His views are "fiscally conservative but socially liberal". Scott has said: "I am very much a fiscal conservative. But not unlike most Republicans in the Northeast, I'm probably more on the left of center from a social standpoint ... I am a pro-choice Republican". He supported the impeachment inquiry into Donald Trump that began in September 2019, and called for Trump to "resign or be removed from office" after the 2021 storming of the U.S. Capitol building. In the 2020 and 2024 presidential elections, Scott announced he voted for Democratic nominees Joe Biden and Kamala Harris, respectively, calling the latter "a vote against Donald Trump" and a move to "put country over party".

=== Fiscal and budgetary issues ===
Scott pledged to veto any budget that grows faster than the growth rate of the underlying economy or wages in the previous year, or that increases statewide property taxes. Conflicts over raising property tax rates, which the state legislature supported and Scott opposed, led to a strained relationship between him and the legislature in 2018 for the FY19 budget, despite high revenues overall.

Scott made addressing Vermont's long-term unfunded liabilities a priority, and worked with State Treasurer Beth Pearce to pay down Vermont's pension debt.

=== Taxes and fees ===
The FY18 budget Scott signed into law did not include any new or increased taxes or fees. He has said that he opposes any new taxes. He also refused to sign a bill that would have raised property taxes. Scott vetoed the FY19 budget twice before allowing it to go into law without his signature, as the threat of a government shutdown approached.

In early 2018, Scott called for eliminating the tax on Social Security benefits. House legislators incorporated a modified form of this proposal into the final FY19 budget, eliminating the tax for low- and middle-income retirees. The tax reform Scott planned (which was ultimately implemented) also lowered state income tax rates by 0.2% for all brackets; tied Vermont's tax system to Adjusted Gross Income (AGI); created Vermont-defined income deductions and personal exemptions similar to the federal tax code; increased the state earned income tax credit by three percentage points; and added a new 5% charitable contribution tax credit. Scott's administration has reduced both Workers' Compensation and Unemployment Insurance tax rates. He has twice proposed to phase out the tax on military retirement income, which the legislature did not advance.

=== Economic development ===
In 2016, Scott set a goal of boosting the state's economy by increasing the state's population to 700,000 within 10 years by encouraging young people who come to study in the state to remain after graduation. University of Vermont economics professor Arthur Woolf Scott suggested that retention of older Vermonters, with larger incomes and tax revenues, would be a better focus, but Scott pointed to the lower average healthcare costs associated with a younger population.

Scott's economic development plan has largely focused on workforce development and economic incentives. He has advocated and achieved increasing tax credits for development, new support for small business, additional initiatives for rural economic growth, tax increment financing, permitting reform, and tax exemptions in key industries. Scott has made expanding the labor force a priority of his administration, and has proposed and achieved initiatives that invest in workforce recruitment, retention, and relocation.

=== Healthcare ===
Scott signed a bill requiring Vermonters to have health insurance, making Vermont among a few states to implement such a policy after the federal repeal of the individual mandate provision of the Affordable Care Act. But in part due to his opposition to a financial penalty for an individual mandate, the legislature passed and Scott signed a bill that would simply require attestation of health insurance.

Scott has advocated moving away from a fee-for-service-based healthcare system, and has suggested focusing more on the quality of care and services rendered. This model has been implemented on a pilot basis with an accountable care organization.

In April 2021, Bryan Kehl and Christopher Rufo, among others, criticized Scott for implementing a race-based COVID-19 vaccination schedule. In response, he released a statement condemning what he called a "racist response" to the plan.

=== Education ===
Scott has called for modifying Act 46 to improve cost containment measures, incorporate property tax reduction, preserve local control and school choice, and allow communities to keep the funds they save through school district mergers. He has expressed support for flexible learning plans and new technologies to improve educational outcomes.

Scott's FY18 budget made investments in education, including a $3 million increase in the base appropriation to the Vermont State Colleges to stabilize tuition and a new position in the Agency of Education focused on career and technical education. The budget also expanded a base appropriation for child care financial assistance by $2.5 million. The FY20 budget Scott signed into law built on these investments, with an additional $7.4 million for child care and $3 million more for higher education. The next year, Scott worked with the legislature to eliminate tuition for members of the Vermont National Guard.

As a state senator, Scott voted for legislation to reduce education property tax rates. Scott's FY18 budget froze property tax rates, and the FY19 budget froze residential property tax rates.

In July 2025, Scott signed an education reform bill, marking a transitional shift in the Vermont public school system.

=== Gun law ===
Scott passed legislation that banned bump stock devices, expanded background checks for gun purchases, raised the age to purchase firearms to 21 (with certain exceptions), limited the sale of certain high-capacity magazines, increased restrictions on the sale of firearms to alleged domestic abusers, and created risk protection orders. In September 2018, Scott created a Violence Prevention Task Force, ordered a security assessment of all Vermont schools, and signed legislation appropriating $5 million for school security grants. Scott also signed gun control legislation that "limits some aspects of gun possession and empowers authorities to remove guns from people who may be dangerous."

=== Government reform and modernization ===
Scott supports limiting Vermont's annual legislative session to 90 days. According to him, the session's unpredictable length discourages everyday Vermonters from running for office. A 90-day session, according to Scott, would encourage more people to run for elected office by setting clear parameters. Furthermore, he argues that a 90-day session would force the legislature to focus on key fiscal and operational issues.

As governor, Scott created a Government Modernization and Efficiency Team to implement efficiency audits, strengthen IT planning, implement a digital government strategy, and identify opportunities to eliminate inefficiencies, establish clear metrics and streamline services. He also created the Program to Improve Vermont Outcomes Together (PIVOT) initiative, which asks frontline state employees for ways to make state government systems more efficient and easier to use. Scott consolidated IT functions in state government with the creation of the Agency of Digital Services, saving $2.19 million. He also merged the Department of Liquor Control and the Lottery Department into the Department of Liquor and Lottery to achieve savings. Scott's administration has worked to achieve internal improvements through lean training and permit process improvements. He also successfully sought to eliminate and merge redundant boards, commissions, studies and reports.

=== Transportation ===
In July 2016, Scott outlined the transportation priorities he would implement as governor. He said he would strengthen the link between economic growth and Vermont's infrastructure; oppose additional transportation taxes, including a carbon tax; oppose accumulating additional state debt for transportation; encourage innovation in transportation by implementing a Research and Development (R&D) tax credit and an Angel Investor tax credit (a 60% credit toward cash equity investments in Vermont businesses, specifically targeted toward transportation, energy and manufacturing firms); protect the state's transportation fund to ensure it is used for transportation purposes only; advocate federal reforms and flexibility in transportation policy; and update the Agency of Transportation's long-range plan for transportation.

=== Abortion ===
Scott is pro-choice. In June 2019, he signed into law an abortion rights bill that was among the most wide-ranging in the U.S. in providing for abortion at any time, protecting "the fundamental right of every individual who becomes pregnant to choose to carry a pregnancy to term, to give birth to a child, or to have an abortion." In June 2022, Scott expressed his disappointment over the overturning of Roe v. Wade, and announced that a constitutional amendment to safeguard abortion rights would appear on the November ballot. In December 2022, he signed a constitutional amendment passed by Vermont voters to further protect the right to abortion in the state.

=== LGBT ===
Scott supports same-sex marriage. He signed into law a gender-neutral bathroom bill intended to recognize the rights of transgender people. Of the new law, he said, "Vermont has a well-earned reputation for embracing equality and being inclusive".

=== Drugs ===
Scott being questioned by Terri Sewell while testifying in Congress about the opioid epidemic in 2018

On May 24, 2017, Scott vetoed a bill that would have legalized recreational marijuana in Vermont. In October 2020, he announced he would not veto another bill to legalize recreational marijuana use, allowing the bill to become a law without his signature.

As governor, Scott created an Opioid Coordination Council, appointed a director of drug policy and prevention, and convened a statewide summit on growing the workforce to support opioid and substance abuse treatment. To further treatment options, he worked with the Secretary of State's Office of Professional Regulation to streamline the licensing process for treatment professionals. Scott boosted efforts to reduce the drug supply through the Vermont Drug Task Force, Drug Take Back days, and expanding prescription drug disposal sites.

=== Immigration ===
Scott opposed the Trump administration's immigration policies. In 2017, he signed a bill to limit the involvement of Vermont police with the federal government regarding immigration, and the Department of Justice notified Vermont that it had been preliminarily found to be a sanctuary jurisdiction on November 15, 2017. Scott opposed the Trump administration's "zero tolerance" policy and the separation of families at the border.

=== Environmental issues ===
Scott approved $48 million for clean water funding in 2017. He signed an executive order creating the Vermont Climate Action Commission. Scott announced a settlement with Saint-Gobain to address water quality issues and PFOA contamination in Bennington County. His FY18 budget proposal called for a tax holiday on energy efficient products and vehicles. On June 2, 2017, Scott led Vermont to join the United States Climate Alliance, after President Trump withdrew the U.S. from the Paris Agreement. Scott committed to achieving 90% renewable energy by 2050. In 2019, he signed several pieces of legislation related to water quality, including creating a long-term funding mechanism for cleaning up the state's waterways, testing for lead in schools and child care centers, and regulating perfluorooctanoic acid and related PFAS chemicals in drinking water. On September 15, 2020, Scott vetoed the Global Warming Solutions Act, which mandated reductions to Vermont's carbon emissions. Ten days later, his veto was overridden.

=== 2025 deployment of National Guard in U.S. cities ===
In 2025, the Trump administration initiated federal deployments of National Guard and other government entities to several U.S. cities, citing aims to combat crime, civil unrest, and threats to federal property. In August 2025, Scott declined a federal request to deploy Vermont's National Guard to Washington, D.C., as part of the administration's expanded security operations in that city.

In October 2025, Scott called Trump's decision to dispatch the National Guard to cities like Chicago and Portland "unconstitutional", arguing that militarizing domestic settings without clear justification threatens public stability and encroaches on state sovereignty.

== Racing career ==
Scott is a champion stock car racer. He won the 1996 and 1998 Thunder Road Late Model Series (LMS) championships and the 1997 and 1999 Thunder Road Milk Bowls. (The Milk Bowl is Thunder Road's annual season finale.)

In 2002, he became a three-time champion, winning both the Thunder Road and Airborne Late Model Series track championships and the American Canadian Tour championship. (Airborne Park Speedway is a stock car track in the town of Plattsburgh, New York). He also competed in the 2005 British Stock Car Association (BriSCA) Formula One Championship of the World, but did not finish.

On July 6, 2017, Scott won the Thunder Road Late Model Series feature race; he started from the pole, and the victory was his first since 2013. He participated in a limited number of Thunder Road events in 2019, and won the June 27, 2019, LMS feature race. In July 2022, Scott competed in the Governor's Cup 150, in which he finished 23rd. As of July 2019, he has 31 career wins, the most in Late Model division history.

== Personal life ==
Scott has been married three times, first to Jane Manosh, and later to Angela Wright. He lives in Berlin, Vermont, with his wife Diana McTeague Scott. He has two adult daughters.

== Electoral history ==
=== 2024 ===
Republican primary results
Party	Candidate	Votes	%
Republican	Phil Scott (incumbent)	23,173	98.10
Write-in		448	1.90
Total votes		23,621	100.00
Republican	Undervotes	1,357	
Republican	Overvotes	7	

2024 Vermont gubernatorial election
Party	Candidate	Votes	%
Republican	Phil Scott (incumbent)	266,428	73.60
Democratic/Progressive	Esther Charlestin	79,217	21.88
Independent	Kevin Hoyt	9,362	2.59
Green Mountain Peace and Justice	June Goodband	4,511	1.25
Independent	Poa Mutino	2,414	0.67
Write-in		81	0.02
Total votes		362,013	100.00
Republican hold			

=== 2022 ===
2022 Vermont Republican gubernatorial primary results
Party	Candidate	Votes	%
Republican	Phil Scott (incumbent)	20,319	68.56
Republican	Stephen C. Bellows	5,402	18.22
Republican	Peter Duval	3,627	12.24
Write-in		290	0.98
Total votes		29,638	100.00
Republican	Blank votes	911	
Republican	Overvotes	11	

2022 Vermont gubernatorial election
Party	Candidate	Votes	%
Republican	Phil Scott (incumbent)	201,113	71.29
Democratic/Progressive	Brenda Siegel (Note: Candidate received the nominations of both the Democratic and Progressive parties and was listed on the ballot as "Democratic/Progressive" (candidate is primarily a Democrat).)	67,946	24.09
Independent	Kevin Hoyt	6,007	2.13
Independent	Peter Duval	4,714	1.67
Independent	Bernard Peters	2,307	0.82
Total votes		282,087	100.00
Republican hold			

=== 2020 ===
2020 Vermont Republican gubernatorial primary results
Party	Candidate	Votes	%
Republican	Phil Scott (incumbent)	42,275	72.67
Republican	John Klar	12,762	21.94
Republican	Emily Peyton	970	1.67
Republican	Douglas Cavett	966	1.66
Republican	Bernard Peters	772	1.33
Write-in		426	0.73
Total votes		58,171	100.00

2020 Vermont gubernatorial election
Party	Candidate	Votes	%	±%
Republican	Phil Scott (incumbent)	248,412	68.49	+13.30
Progressive	David Zuckerman	99,214	27.35	−12.90
Independent	Kevin Hoyt	4,576	1.26	N/A
Independent	Emily Peyton	3,505	0.97	N/A
Independent	Erynn Hazlett Whitney	1,777	0.49	N/A
Independent	Wayne Billado III	1,431	0.39	N/A
Independent	Michael A. Devost	1,160	0.32	N/A
Independent	Charly Dickerson	1,037	0.29	N/A
Write-in		1,599	0.44	N/A
Total votes		362,711	100.00	+32.33
Republican hold				

=== 2018 ===
2018 Republican gubernatorial primary results
Party	Candidate	Votes	%
Republican	Phil Scott (incumbent)	24,042	66.67
Republican	Keith Stern	11,617	32.22
Write-in		401	1.11
Total votes		36,060	100.00
Republican	Blank votes	700	
Republican	Overvotes	20	

2018 Vermont gubernatorial election
Party	Candidate	Votes	%	±%
Republican	Phil Scott (incumbent)	151,261	55.19	+2.28
Democratic	Christine Hallquist	110,335	40.25	−3.91
Independent	Trevor Barlow	3,266	1.19	N/A
Independent	Charles Laramie	2,287	0.83	N/A
Independent	Cris Ericson	2,129	0.78	N/A
Earth Rights	Stephen Marx	1,855	0.68	N/A
Liberty Union	Emily Peyton	1,839	0.66	−2.17
Write-in		1,115	0.41	-0.31
Total votes		274,087	100.00	N/A
Republican hold				

=== 2016 ===
2016 Republican gubernatorial primary results
Party	Candidate	Votes	%
Republican	Phil Scott	27,669	60.50
Republican	Bruce Lisman	18,055	39.50
Write-in		48	0.22
Total votes		45,772	100.00

2016 Vermont gubernatorial election
Party	Candidate	Votes	%
Republican	Phil Scott	166,249	52.95
Democratic	Sue Minter	138,935	44.25
Liberty Union	Bill Lee	8,808	2.81
Total votes		313,992	100.00
Republican gain from Democratic			

=== 2014 ===
Republican lieutenant gubernatorial primary results
Party	Candidate	Votes	%
Republican	Phil Scott (incumbent)	15,282	99.19
Write-in		125	0.81
Total votes		15,407	100.00

2014 Vermont lieutenant gubernatorial election
Party	Candidate	Votes	%
Republican	Phil Scott (incumbent)	118,949	62.14
Progressive	Dean Corren	69,005	36.05
Liberty Union	Marina Brown	3,347	1.75
Write-in		115	0.06
Total votes		191,416	100.00
Republican hold			

=== 2012 ===
2012 Lieutenant gubernatorial Republican primary results
Party	Candidate	Votes	%
Republican	Phil Scott (incumbent)	9,262	99.69
Write-in		29	0.31
Total votes		9,291	100.00

2012 Vermont Lieutenant Gubernatorial General Election
Party	Candidate	Votes	%
Republican	Phil Scott (incumbent)	162,787	57.11
Democratic	Cassandra Gekas	115,015	40.35
Liberty Union	Ben Mitchell	6,975	2.45
Write-in		257	0.09
Total votes		285,034	100.00
Republican hold			

=== 2010 ===
2010 Lieutenant gubernatorial Republican primary results
Party	Candidate	Votes	%
Republican	Phil Scott	15,981	56.12
Republican	Mark Snelling	12,389	43.51
Write-in		105	0.37
Total votes		28,475	100.00

2010 Vermont lieutenant gubernatorial election
Party	Candidate	Votes	%
Republican	Phil Scott	116,198	48.98
Democratic	Steve Howard	99,843	42.45
Independent	Peter Garritano	8,627	3.67
Progressive	Marjorie Power	8,287	3.52
Liberty Union	Boots Wardinski	2,228	0.95
Total votes		235,183	100.00
Republican hold			

=== 2008 ===
2008 Washington County Senate District general election
Party	Candidate	Votes	%
Republican	Phil Scott (incumbent)	15,763	21.20
Democratic	Ann Cummings (incumbent)	15,291	20.57
Republican	Bill Doyle (incumbent)	15,089	20.30
Democratic	Kimberly B. Cheney	11,673	15.71
Democratic	Laura Day Moore	10,847	14.59
Republican	John R. Gilligan	5,660	7.62
Total votes		74,323	100.00

=== 2006 ===
2006 Washington County Senate District general election
Party	Candidate	Votes	%
Democratic	Ann Cummings (incumbent)	14,416	20.47
Republican	Bill Doyle (incumbent)	12,994	18.45
Republican	Phil Scott (incumbent)	12,595	17.89
Democratic	Kimberly B. Cheney	11,685	16.59
Democratic	Denny Osman	11,154	15.84
Republican	Jim Parker	7,573	10.76
Total votes		70,417	100.00

=== 2004 ===
2004 Washington County Senate District general election
Party	Candidate	Votes	%
Republican	Bill Doyle (incumbent)	16,274	21.08
Democratic	Ann Cummings (incumbent)	16,134	20.90
Republican	Phil Scott (incumbent)	13,294	17.22
Democratic	Kimberly B. Cheney	13,064	16.92
Democratic	Michael Roche	9,242	11.97
Republican	J. Paul Giuliani	9,194	11.91
Total votes		77,202	100.00

=== 2002 ===
2002 Washington County Senate District general election
Party	Candidate	Votes	%
Republican	Bill Doyle (incumbent)	13,017	21.94
Democratic	Ann Cummings (incumbent)	11,213	18.90
Republican	Phil Scott (incumbent)	10,849	18.28
Republican	J. Paul Giuliani	8,982	15.14
Democratic	Kimberly B. Cheney	8,450	14.24
Democratic	Charles Phillips	6,822	11.50
Total votes		59,333	100.00

2002 Washington County Senate District Republican Party primary election
Party	Candidate	Votes	%
Republican	Bill Doyle (incumbent)	1,725	31.86
Republican	J. Paul Giuliani	1,556	28.74
Republican	Phil Scott (incumbent)	1,547	28.57
Republican	George Corey	587	10.84
Total votes		5,415	100.00

=== 2000 ===
2000 Washington County Senate District general election
Party	Candidate	Votes	%
Republican	Bill Doyle (incumbent)	15,298	20.51
Republican	Phil Scott	13,412	17.98
Democratic	Ann Cummings	12,220	16.39
Republican	J. Paul Giuliani	11,997	16.09
Democratic	Warren F. Kitzmiller	11,378	15.26
Democratic	Paul N. Poirier	10,276	13.78
Total votes		74,581	100.00

== Notes ==
Party political offices
Preceded by Brian Dubie	Republican nominee for Lieutenant Governor of Vermont; 2010, 2012, 2014	Succeeded by Randy Brock
Preceded by Scott Milne	Republican nominee for Governor of Vermont; 2016, 2018, 2020, 2022, 2024, 2026	Most recent
Political offices
Preceded by Brian Dubie	Lieutenant Governor of Vermont; 2011–2017	Succeeded by David Zuckerman
Preceded by Peter Shumlin	Governor of Vermont; 2017–present	Incumbent
U.S. order of precedence (ceremonial)
Preceded by JD Vance as Vice President	Order of precedence of the United States; Within Vermont	Succeeded by Mayor of city in which event is held
Preceded by JD Vance as Vice President	Order of precedence of the United States; Within Vermont	Succeeded by Otherwise Mike Johnson as Speaker of the House
Preceded by Dan McKee as Governor of Rhode Island	Order of precedence of the United States; Outside Vermont	Succeeded by Andy Beshear as Governor of Kentucky
