= Vermont Democratic Party =

Vermont affiliate of the Democratic Party

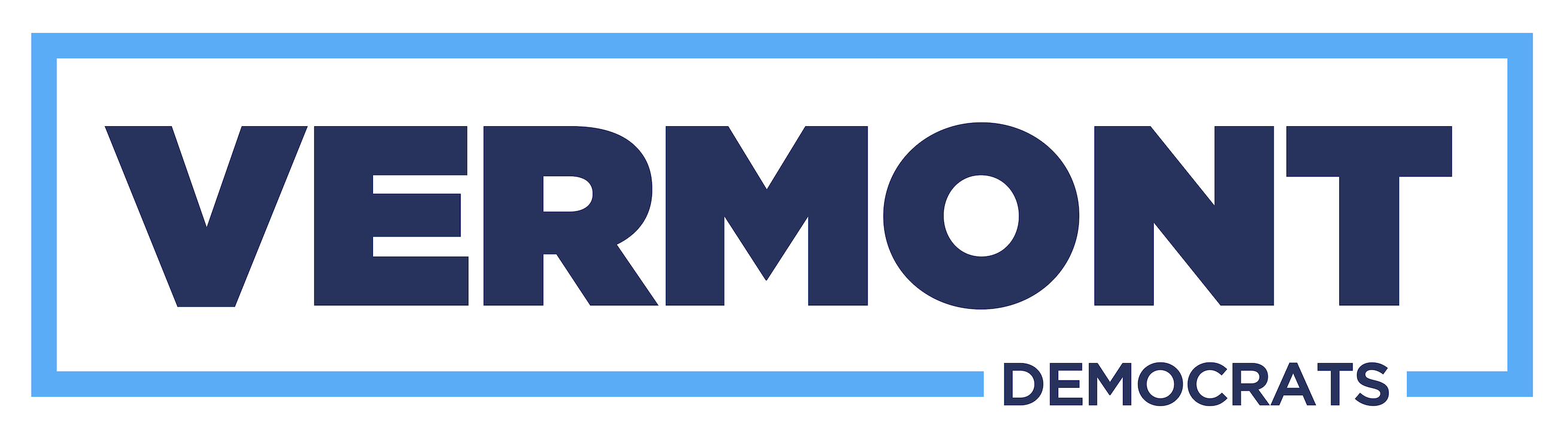
- Chairperson: Lachlan Francis
- President pro tempore of the Vermont Senate: Philip Baruth
- House Speaker: Jill Krowinski
- Founded: 1830
- Headquarters: Montpelier, Vermont
- National affiliation: Democratic Party
- Colors: Blue
- U.S. Senate seats (Note: Vermont's independent senator, Bernie Sanders, caucuses with the Democrats.): 1 / 2
- U.S. House seats: 1 / 1
- Statewide offices: 4 / 6
- Vermont Senate: 16 / 30
- Vermont House of Representatives: 87 / 150
- Elected county judges: 33 / 42
- Countywide offices: 34 / 42
- Mayoralties: 2 / 8
- Burlington, Vermont City Council: 7 / 12

Website
- www.vtdemocrats.org

The Vermont Democratic Party is the affiliate of the Democratic Party in the U.S. state of Vermont.

Since the founding of the Republican Party until the 1960s, Vermont was almost exclusively a Republican state, with Republicans dominating Vermont politics, especially the governorship, from 1854 to 1960. But Democrats have since staged a resurgence in state politics, perhaps inspired by the election of John F. Kennedy as president in 1960.

It is now the dominant party in the state, controlling Vermont's at-large U.S. House seat, one of its U.S. Senate seats, and majorities in both houses of the state legislature. Vermont's other U.S. Senate seat is held by Bernie Sanders, an independent who caucuses with the Democratic Party. The only statewide offices the party does not control is the governorship, held by Republican Phil Scott, and the lieutenant governorship, held by Republican John S. Rodgers.

== History ==
The date the state party was formed is unknown because the state headquarters has not retained historical documents. Until 1824, opponents of the Federalist Party were known as Republicans or Democratic-Republicans. After the demise of the Federalists left only one major party, supporters of Democratic-Republicans John Quincy Adams and Henry Clay were largely responsible for founding the Whig Party in the early 1830s as the main opposition to Democratic-Republican Andrew Jackson. In 1830, Vermont newspaper articles still referred to supporters of Andrew Jackson for president in 1832 as Democratic-Republican, or occasionally "Democratic". By 1831, the name Democratic was more often used as a way to distinguish Jackson and his supporters from the "old" Democratic-Republican Party of Thomas Jefferson. By the end of 1831, "Democratic" was used almost exclusively.

Since Republicans dominated Vermont for so long, the national Democratic Party paid little attention to the state. Democrats usually contested statewide elections, but opposition to Republicans was generally desultory. Democrats filled appointed federal positions such as U.S. Attorney during the administrations of Democratic presidents, and were occasionally appointed to positions considered nonpartisan, such as Seneca Haselton's tenure as an associate justice of the Vermont Supreme Court. Only in the 1960s did Democrats start to pull together an effective statewide organization.

Democrats were effectively shut out of high office in Vermont from 1854 until 1958, when Democrat William H. Meyer was narrowly elected to the United States House of Representatives. Until his election, no Democrat had represented Vermont in the House or Senate since the Republican Party was founded. Meyer served only one term, losing to Republican Robert Stafford in 1960.

In 1962, Democrat Philip H. Hoff was elected governor of Vermont, becoming the first Democrat to serve as governor since John S. Robinson. In 1964, Vermont Democrats had the best year in over a century. Hoff was reelected in a landslide, and every other row office—lieutenant governor, attorney general, secretary of state, treasurer, and auditor—was won by a Democrat. The party's success in 1964 was due in part to Lyndon B. Johnson's landslide victory in that year's presidential election, which included a 66%–33% victory in Vermont, the first time the state ever went blue at the presidential level.

In 1974, Patrick Leahy became the first Democrat to represent Vermont in the U.S. Senate, narrowly defeating Republican Richard W. Mallary. Leahy was reelected in a similarly close race in 1980, but never again had a close race; he served seven terms before retiring in 2022.

Democrats gained a majority in the State Senate in 1984, followed by a one-seat State House majority in 1986. With Governor Madeleine Kunin, Democrats had a trifecta for the first time in party history. Except for a brief period from 2000 to 2004, Democrats retained the governing majority in the House to this day.

== Ideology, policies, and party platform ==
=== Ideology ===
Today, the Vermont Democratic Party is rooted in progressivism and American liberalism. The state is considered a breeding ground for Progressives and Independents, many of whom have close ties to the Vermont Democratic Party. Most Progressives run under the Democratic Party banner in Vermont.

=== Policies ===
The Vermont Democratic Party advocates universal health care, equality for all, and social justice. Many of its proposals have been adopted, including universal health care (Green Mountain Care), same-sex marriage, and the closing and decommissioning of the Vermont Yankee nuclear power station in 2015. The party tends towards environmentalism, favoring measures to protect Vermont's natural resources and ecosystems. State Democrats have called for Vermont to be the first state to use only renewable energy sources. The party also favors campaign finance reform, but aligns with the national party in supporting some liberalization of campaign finance regulations so that it may better remain competitive with the Republicans.

=== Party platform ===
On September 12, 2020, the Vermont Democratic Party approved documents representing its platform. It conforms very closely to the United States Democratic Party platform, addressing issues such as the economy, the environment, foreign policy, and civil rights.

==== Economic opportunity ====
The Vermont Democratic Party's economic platform primarily focuses on keeping businesses owned and operated in Vermont. There should be heavy focus on entrepreneurship and job creation. The party supports a strong and vibrant middle class that encourages youth to pursue careers within the state. Its main focus is economic growth and job creation. The party believes that the state government should make Vermont a desirable place for people to bring or start businesses. The party plans to do this by giving financial incentives to businesses that are energy-efficient, are in Vermont's developing areas, and provide workers with a livable wage. The party wants to reverse the Bush tax cuts. It supports a graduated income tax based on ability to pay. Under such a system, the wealthy are taxed at a higher rate than the middle class, and the very poor pay little or no income tax.

==== Environmental issues ====
The party believes a healthy environment is essential to quality of life and recognizes global climate change as a major problem. The party believes we have moral and ethical obligations to protect and conserve the environment. It is committed to the rigorous and consistent enforcement of environmental laws and regulations. It supports alternative energy, including investments and research, and favors rapid implementation of "cleaner" alternatives to oil and other fossil fuels. Vermont Democrats support laws that cap, or limit, the carbon emissions of both public transportation and personal vehicles.

==== Foreign policy ====
The party opposed the wars in Iraq and Afghanistan. It believes the decision to go to war was ill-advised and led to the deaths of thousands of innocent people. The party strongly supported President Barack Obama's decisions to withdraw troops from both Iraq and Afghanistan.

==== Civil rights ====
The Vermont Democratic Party supports equal rights amendments to the Constitution and the protection of all citizens, regardless of race, gender, sexual orientation, age, national origin, disability, military service, or creed. It supported Vermont's pioneering initiatives in same-sex marriage and the preceding laws favoring civil unions. It supported the repeals of Don't Ask, Don't Tell and the Defense of Marriage Act. The party denounces torture and believes all people have due process rights that should never be violated. The party strongly supported Obama's decision to ban the torturous technique of waterboarding from being used on suspected terrorists.

== Howard Dean ==
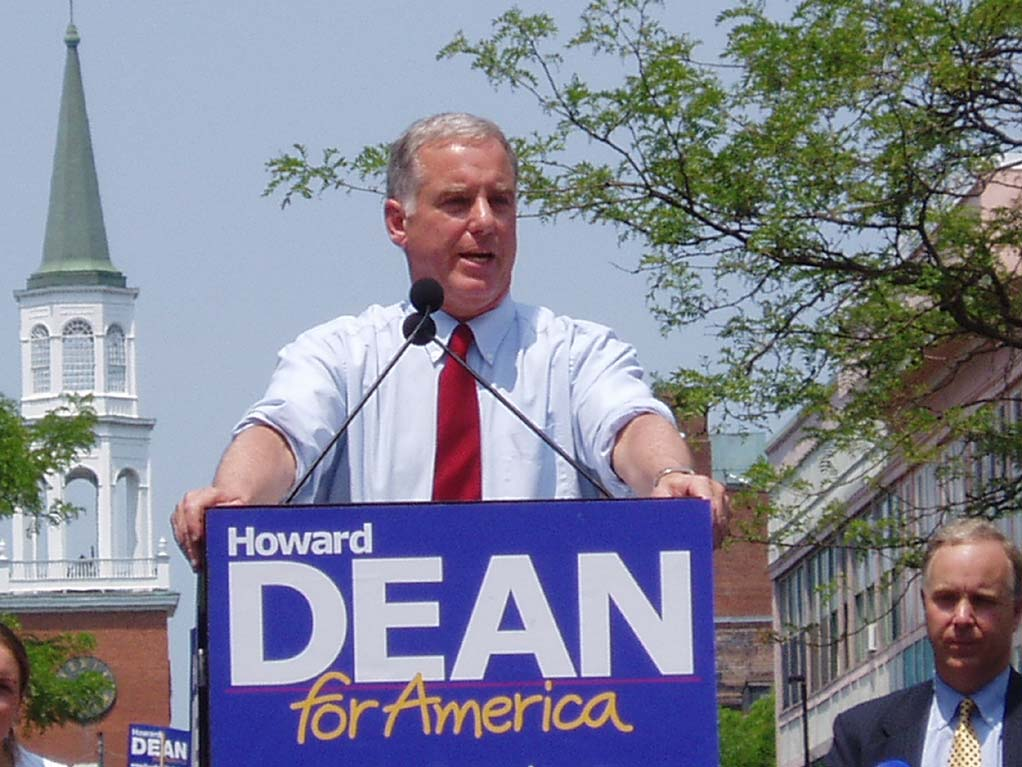
Howard Dean announcing his run for president

Howard Dean may be the most nationally renowned Democratic politician to come out of Vermont in recent years. He served as governor of Vermont from 1991 to 2003. In 2004 he ran for the Democratic nomination for president. Dean chaired the Democratic National Committee from 2005 to 2009 and is credited with being instrumental in Obama's election as president in 2008. His fifty-state strategy is widely considered the reason Obama was able to win some typically Republican states.

== Current elected officials ==
As of late 2020, Democrats hold five of the six statewide offices in the executive branch—all but governor (Republican)—and firm majorities in Vermont's Senate and House of Representatives. At the federal level, Democrats hold one of the state's U.S. Senate seats and the state's single at-large seat in the U.S. House of Representatives. Senator Peter Welch, first elected to the U.S. House in 2006, was the first Democrat to represent Vermont in the lower chamber of Congress since William H. Meyer in 1961, and the first House Democrat from Vermont to be reelected in more than 150 years.

=== Members of Congress ===
==== U.S. Senate ====
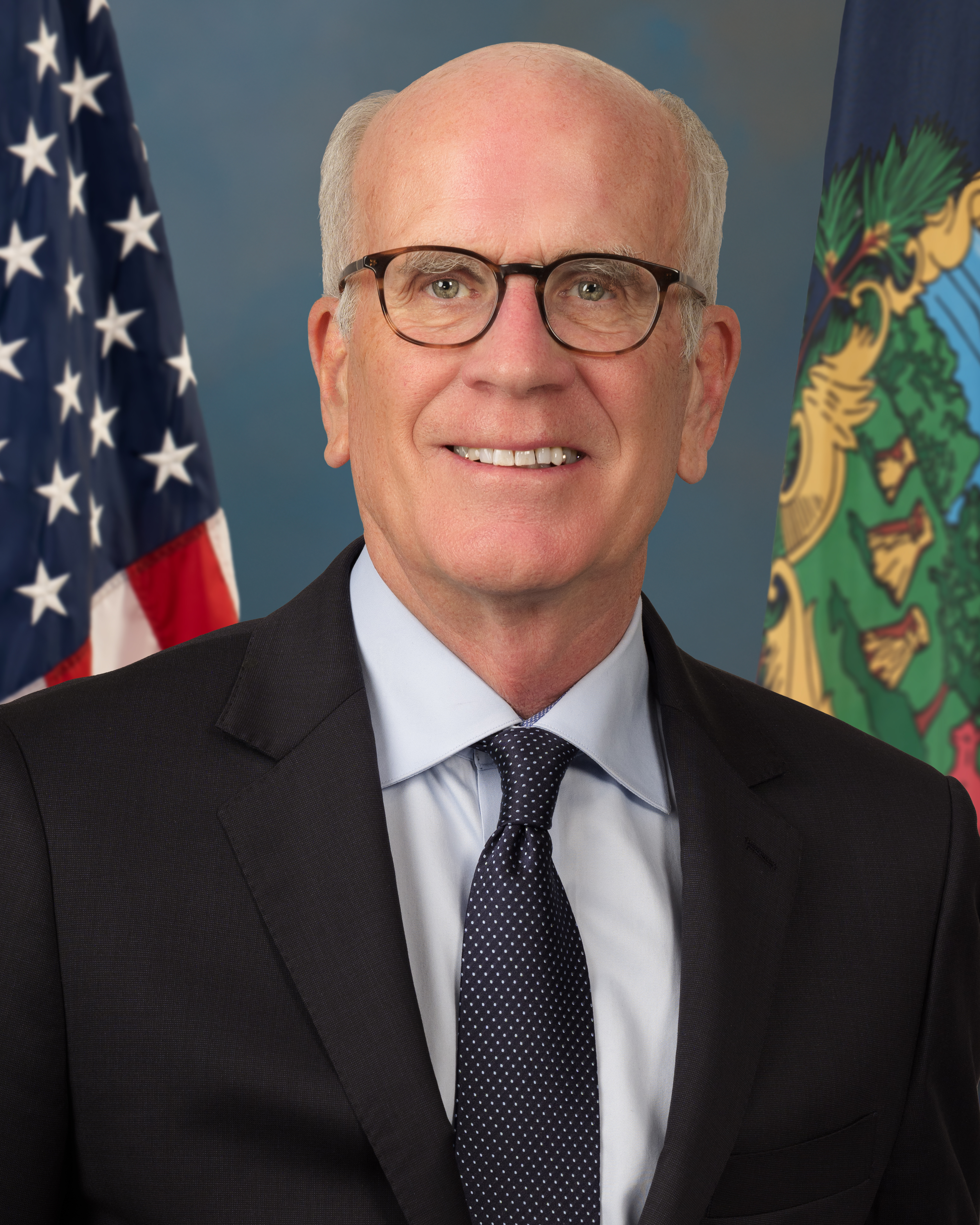
Junior U.S. Senator Peter Welch

==== U.S. House of Representatives ====
District	Member	Photo
At-large	Becca Balint	

=== Statewide offices ===
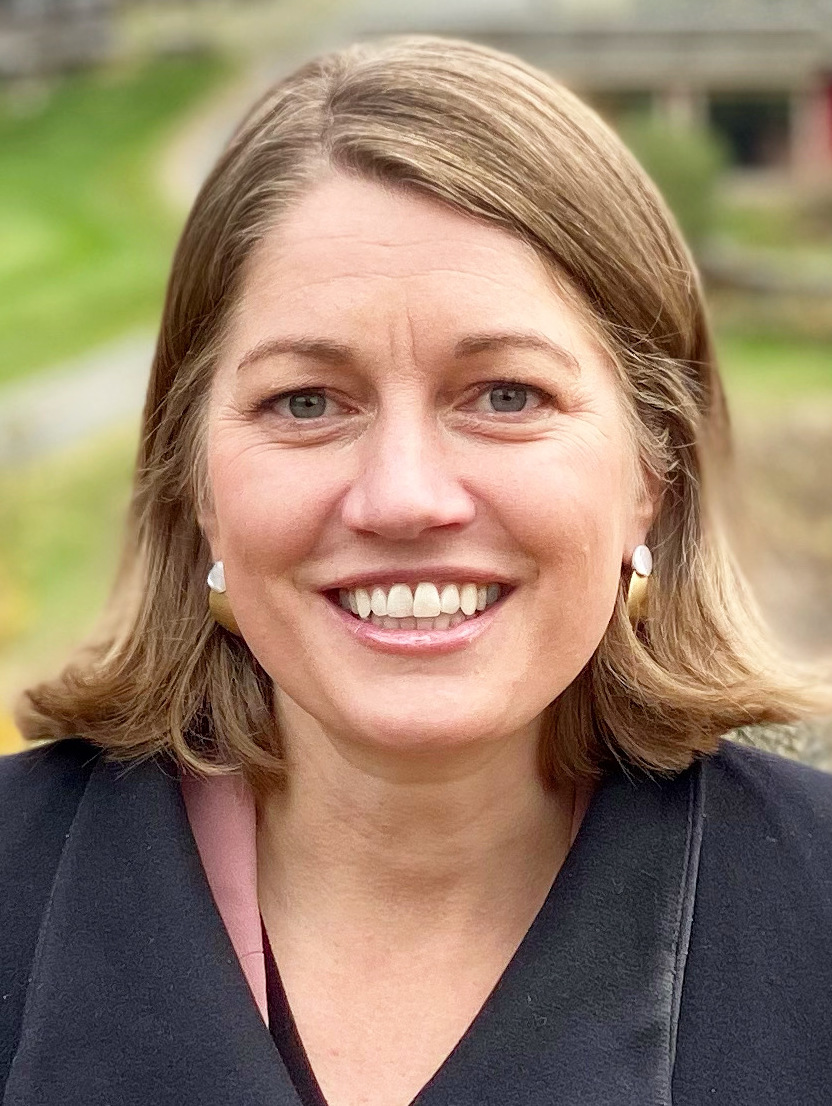
Lieutenant Governor-elect Molly Gray

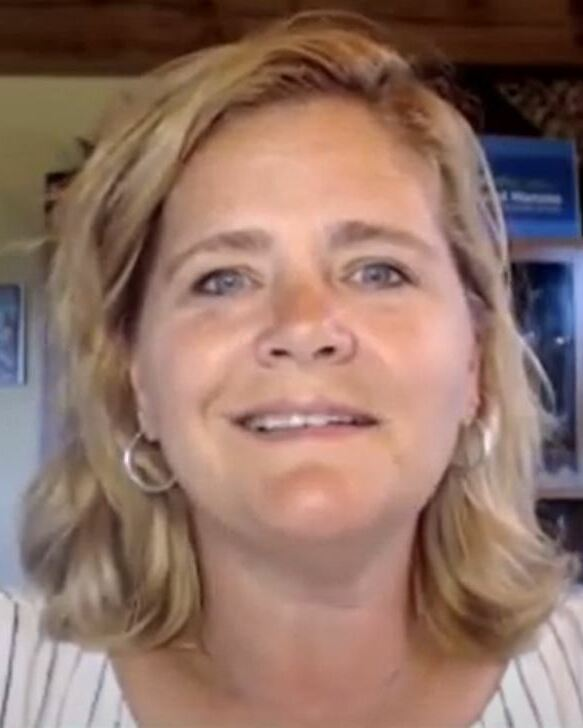
Secretary of State Sarah Copeland-Hanzas

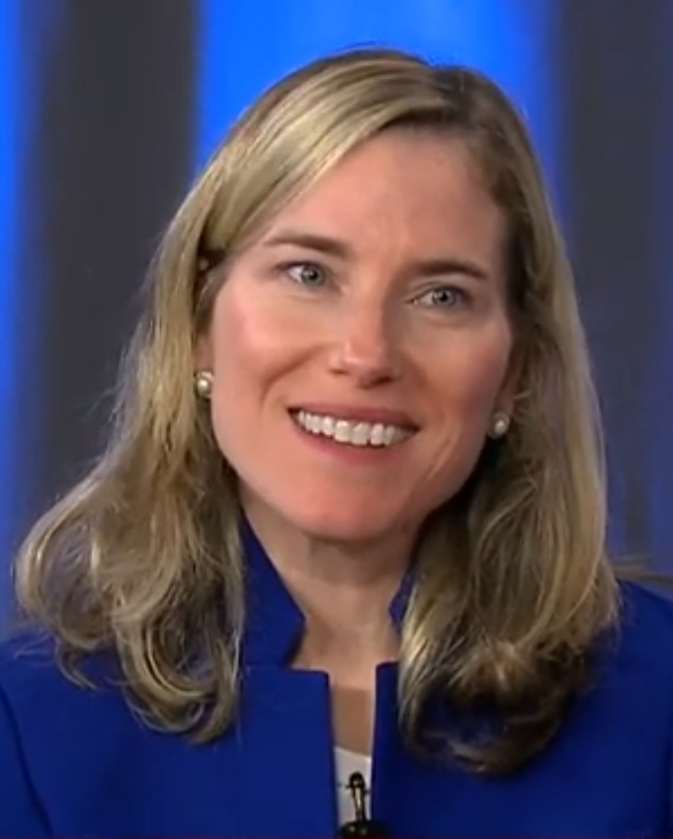
Attorney General Charity Clark

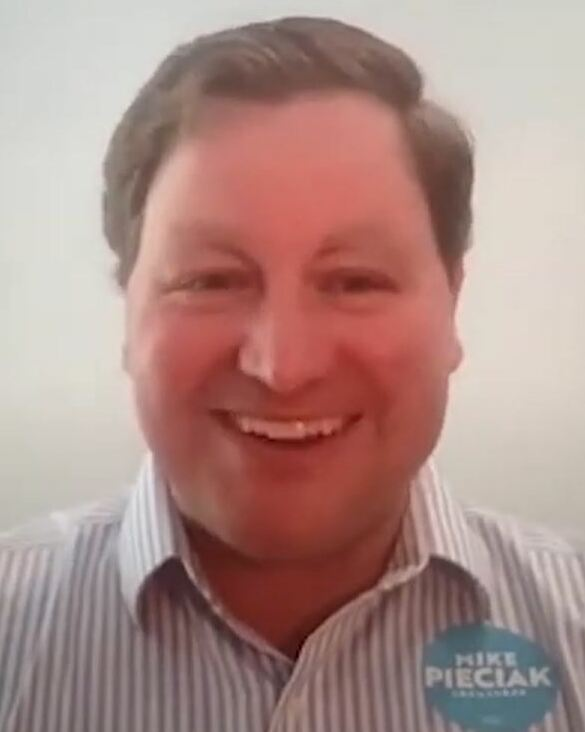
State Treasurer Mike Pieciak

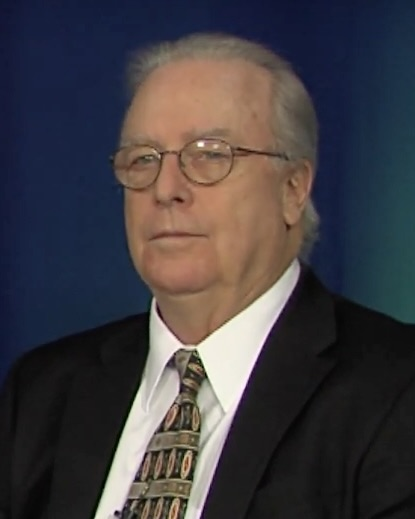
State Treasurer Doug Hoffer (Note: Hoffer is a member of both the Vermont Democratic Party and the Vermont Progressive Party. He was elected Auditor as the nominee of both parties.)

=== Legislative ===
- President pro tempore of the Vermont Senate: Philip Baruth
- Senate Majority Leader: Kesha Ram Hinsdale
- Speaker of the Vermont House of Representatives: Jill Krowinski
- House Majority Leader: Lori Houghton

== Notable members ==
=== Governors ===
- John S. Robinson, 1853–1854
- Philip H. Hoff, 1963–1969
- Thomas P. Salmon, 1973–1977
- Madeleine M. Kunin, 1985–1991
- Howard Dean, 1991–2003
- Peter Shumlin, 2011–2017

=== Senators ===
- Patrick Leahy, 1975–2023
- Peter Welch, 2023–present

=== Representatives ===
- Isaac Fletcher, 1837–1841
- John Smith, 1839–1841
- Paul Dillingham Jr., 1843–1847
- Lucius Benedict Peck, 1847–1851
- Thomas Bartlett Jr., 1851–1853
- William H. Meyer, 1959–1961
- Peter Welch, 2007–2023
- Becca Balint, 2023–present
