= 2024 Vermont Auditor of Accounts election =

- November 5, 2024
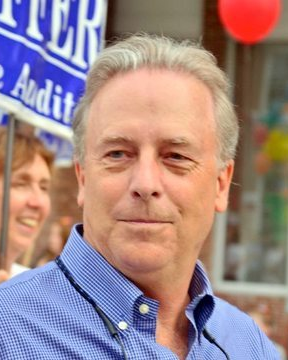

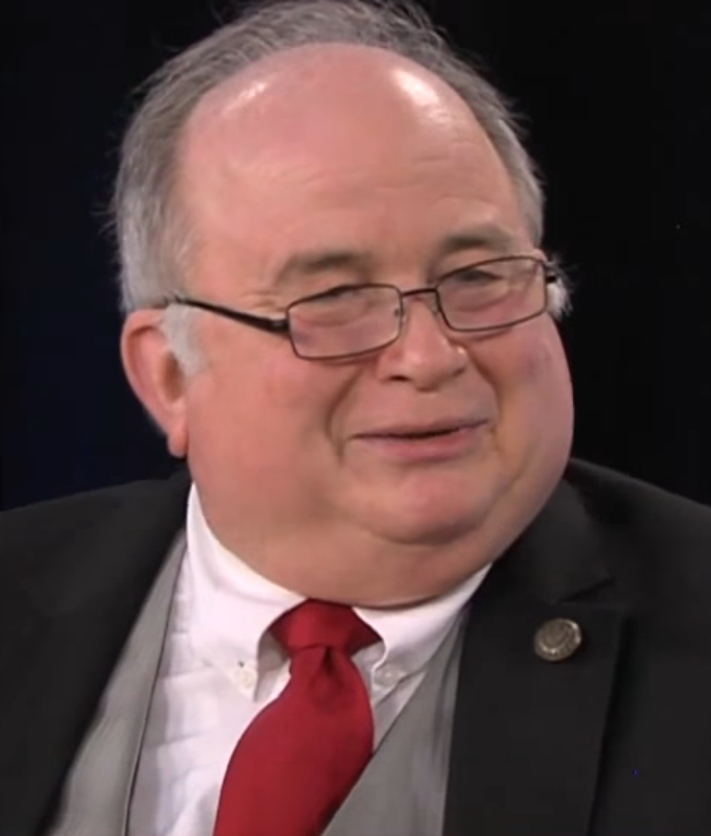
Nominee	Doug Hoffer	H. Brooke Paige
Party	Democratic	Republican
Alliance	Progressive
Popular vote	207,195	134,066
Percentage	60.62%	39.22%
- Hoffer: 50–60% 60–70% 70–80% 80–90% Paige: 40–50% 50–60% 60–70% 70–80% Tie: 50% No votes
State Auditor before election
Doug Hoffer
Democratic
Elected State Auditor
Doug Hoffer
Democratic

The 2024 Vermont Auditor of Accounts election was held on November 5, 2024, to elect the Vermont State Auditor. It coincided with the concurrent presidential election, as well as various state and local elections, including for U.S. Senate, U.S. House, and governor of Vermont. Incumbent state auditor Doug Hoffer was re-elected to a seventh and final two-year term, defeating Republican newsstand owner H. Brooke Paige.

Primary elections took place on August 13, 2024.

== Democratic primary ==
=== Candidates ===
==== Nominee ====
- Doug Hoffer, incumbent state auditor

=== Results ===
Democratic primary results
Party	Candidate	Votes	%
Democratic	Doug Hoffer (incumbent)	43,893	99.23%
Write-in		341	0.77%
Total votes		44,204	100.00%

== Republican primary ==
=== Candidates ===
==== Nominee ====
- H. Brooke Paige, newsstand owner and perennial candidate

=== Results ===
Republican primary results
Party	Candidate	Votes	%
Republican	H. Brooke Paige	18,129	96.55%
Write-in		647	3.45%
Total votes		18,776	100.00%

== Progressive primary ==
=== Candidates ===
==== Withdrew after nomination ====
- Linda Gravell

=== Results ===
Progressive primary results
Party	Candidate	Votes	%
Progressive	Linda Gravell	277	87.38%
Write-in		40	12.62%
Total votes		317	100.00%

== General election ==
=== Results ===
2024 Vermont State Auditor Election
Party	Candidate	Votes	%
Democratic	Doug Hoffer (incumbent)	207,195	60.62%
Republican	H. Brooke Paige	134,066	39.22%
Write-in		532	0.16%
Total votes		341,793	100.00%

==== By county ====
County	Doug Hoffer Democratic		H. Brooke Paige Republican		Various candidates Other parties	
County	#	%	#	%	#	%
Addison	13,377	62.76%	7,905	37.09%	31	0.15%
Bennington	10,689	56.41%	8,238	43.47%	23	0.12%
Caledonia	7,942	51.1%	7,579	48.77%	20	0.13%
Chittenden	63,995	71.91%	24,828	27.9%	171	0.19%
Essex	1,224	38.41%	1,958	61.44%	5	0.16%
Franklin	11,985	47.66%	13,126	52.2%	37	0.15%
Grand Isle	2,578	54.96%	2,105	44.87%	8	0.17%
Lamoille	8,134	59.7%	5,471	40.16%	19	0.14%
Orange	9,057	54.67%	7,479	45.14%	32	0.19%
Orleans	6,353	46.09%	7,421	53.84%	9	0.07%
Rutland	14,994	47.06%	16,825	52.81%	43	0.13%
Washington	21,381	65.33%	11,279	34.46%	66	0.2%
Windham	16,079	67.9%	7,569	31.96%	34	0.14%
Windsor	19,407	61.17%	12,283	38.72%	34	0.11%
Totals	207,195	60.62%	134,066	39.22%	532	0.16%

Counties that flipped from Democratic to Republican

- Franklin (largest city: St. Albans)
- Rutland (largest city: Rutland)
- Orleans (largest city: Derby)
