= Senator Ladd (disambiguation) =

Edwin F. Ladd (1859–1925) was a U.S. Senator from North Dakota from 1921 to 1925. Senator Ladd may also refer to:

- Bart Ladd (born 1957), Georgia State Senate
- Charles R. Ladd (1822–1903), Massachusetts State Senate
- Jedd P. Ladd (1828–1894), Vermont State Senate
