= Senator Ready =

Senator Ready may refer to:

- Elizabeth M. Ready (born 1953), Vermont State Senate
- Justin Ready (born 1982), Maryland State Senate
