= Jeptha Bradley =

American judge (1802–1864)

13th Auditor of Vermont
- In office 1860 – June 8, 1864
- Preceded by: William M. Pingry
- Succeeded by: Dugald Stewart

Personal details
- Born: December 31, 1802 Fairfield, Vermont, U.S.
- Died: June 8, 1864 (aged 61) St. Albans, Vermont, U.S.
- Resting place: Greenwood Cemetery, St. Albans, Vermont, U.S.
- Party: Republican
- Other political affiliations: Whig
- Occupation: Politician, lawyer, judge

Jeptha Bradley (December 31, 1802 – June 8, 1864) was a mid-19th-century Vermont political figure who served in several elected and appointed offices, including Vermont Auditor of Accounts.

== Early life ==
Bradley was born in Fairfield, Vermont on December 31, 1802. He studied law and was admitted to the bar, afterwards establishing a practice in Franklin and Grand Isle Counties. A Whig, from 1835 to 1839 Bradley served as Sheriff of Franklin County.

== Start of political career ==
Bradley later moved to St. Albans and served in local and county offices including Justice of the Peace and High Bailiff.

He was appointed Inspector of Customs for the station in Alburgh in 1845. In 1847, Bradley was named Postmaster in Highgate Springs.

== Additional activities ==
Bradley was active in the Episcopal church, and served as a Delegate to the 1822 and 1850 annual state conventions.

In 1844, Bradley received a patent for an improved air-heating furnace.

Bradley was one of the founders of the Horticultural Society for the Valley of Lake Champlain in 1850.

== Later political career ==
In 1849, Bradley was elected county Probate Judge, serving until 1850.

Bradley served as Register of Probate from 1850 to 1852, and again in 1854.

He became a Republican when the party was founded in the 1850s. In 1860, he was elected State Auditor by the Vermont General Assembly, and served until his death.

== Death and burial ==
Bradley died in St. Albans on June 8, 1864, and was buried at Greenwood Cemetery in St. Albans.

Political offices
Preceded by William M. Pingry	Vermont Auditor of Accounts; 1860–1864	Succeeded by Dugald Stewart
