= Benjamin Gates (Vermont politician) =

American lawyer and politician

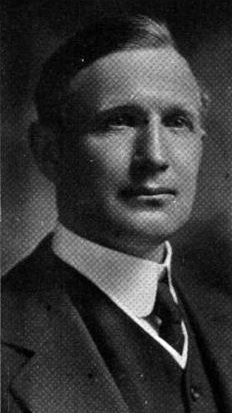
Gates after his 1918 election as Vermont Auditor of Accounts

Benjamin Gates (August 6, 1873 – October 3, 1943) was a Vermont attorney and politician who served as Vermont Auditor of Accounts.

== Early life ==
Gates was born in Pittsford, Vermont on August 6, 1873. He was raised in Sudbury and educated at Brandon Grammar School and Montpelier Seminary.

== Career ==
From 1893 to 1894 and 1901 to 1902 he studied at the Law Department of the University of Michigan.

Gates joined Company A, 1st Connecticut Volunteer Regiment for the Spanish–American War, and served from May to October, 1898, first at Fort Knox in Waldo County, Maine, and then at Camp Alger, Virginia near Washington, D.C.

From 1899 to 1901 he was Deputy Clerk of the Washington County Court.

In 1903 Gates passed the bar and became an attorney in Montpelier. Gates married Bernice Hunt on November 9, 1904.

A Republican, Gates served as Montpelier's Grand Juror from 1904 to 1906, and was Washington County State's Attorney from 1906 to 1910.

In 1912 Gates served as Assistant Clerk of the Vermont House of Representatives.

From 1916 to 1917 Gates served as Secretary of Civil and Military Affairs (chief assistant) to Governor Charles W. Gates.

In 1916 Gates was elected Vermont Auditor of Accounts. He won reelection every two years until 1938. Gates did not run for a thirteenth term in 1940, and served until the expiration of his final term in January 1941. After retiring, Gates was appointed as executive clerk on the staff of Governor William H. Wills; in fact, he acted as an advisor and counselor to the heads of the state government's executive departments and leaders of the Vermont General Assembly.

In addition to serving as State Auditor, Gates was president of the Vermont Building, Savings, and Loan Association, a trustee of the Wood Art Gallery, and a trustee of Green Mount Cemetery.

Gates died at Heaton Hospital in Montpelier on October 3, 1943. He was buried at Green Mount Cemetery in Montpelier.

Party political offices
Preceded by Horace F. Graham	Republican nominee for Vermont State Auditor; 1916, 1918, 1920, 1922, 1924, 1926, 1928, 1930, 1932, 1934, 1936, 1938	Succeeded by David V. Anderson
Political offices
Preceded by Horace Graham	Vermont Auditor of Accounts; 1917 – 1941	Succeeded by David V. Anderson
