= Dugald Stewart (Vermont politician) =

American politician (1821–1870)

- Born: September 26, 1821; Middlebury, Vermont, US
- Died: March 23, 1870 (aged 48); Middlebury, Vermont, US
- Resting place: Middlebury's West Cemetery
- Education: Middlebury College
- Occupations: Accountant and politician
- Employer(s): Rutland and Burlington Railroad
- Title: State Auditor of Accounts
- Term: 1864-1870

Dugald Stewart (September 26, 1821 – March 23, 1870) was a Vermont politician who served as state Auditor of Accounts.

== Biography ==
Born in Middlebury, Vermont on September 26, 1821, Stewart was the brother of Vermont Governor John Wolcott Stewart. He graduated from Middlebury College in 1842, studied law and attained admission to the bar.

Rather than practicing law Stewart opted for a business career, becoming an accountant and paymaster for the Rutland and Burlington Railroad, where he worked from 1848 to 1855.

From 1855 until his death Stewart was Clerk of the Courts in Addison County.

Stewart served in the Vermont House of Representatives from 1860 to 1862. He also served in local offices, including Justice of the Peace.

During the American Civil War Stewart served in the Vermont Militia as Judge Advocate of the 1st Brigade with the rank of First Lieutenant.

In 1864 Stewart was named State Auditor, and he held the position until his death in Middlebury on March 23, 1870.

Political offices
Preceded by Jeptha Bradley	Vermont Auditor of Accounts; 1864–1870	Succeeded by Whitman G. Ferrin
