= Norman Williams (politician) =

American politician (1791–1868)

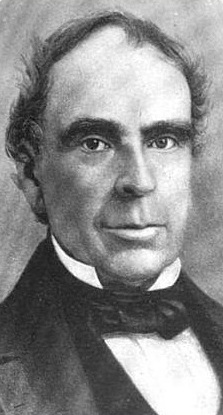

1st Secretary of the Vermont Senate
- In office 1836–1840
- Succeeded by: DeWitt Clinton Clarke

9th Secretary of State of Vermont
- In office 1823–1831
- Governor: Cornelius P. Van Ness; Ezra Butler; Samuel C. Crafts
- Preceded by: William Slade
- Succeeded by: Timothy Merrill

8th Vermont Auditor of Accounts
- In office 1819–1823
- Governor: Jonas Galusha; Richard Skinner
- Preceded by: Willis Hall Jr.
- Succeeded by: David Pierce Jr.

Personal details
- Born: October 6, 1791 Woodstock, Vermont, U.S.
- Died: January 12, 1868 (aged 76)
- Party: National Republican, Whig
- Children: 7, including Charles and Edward
- Education: University of Vermont (1810)
- Occupation: Lawyer, politician
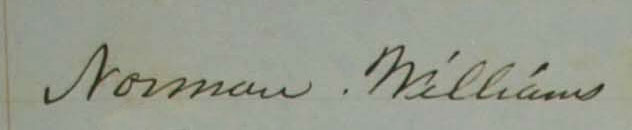
- Signature

Norman Williams (October 6, 1791 – January 12, 1868) was a Vermont attorney and politician. He served as Vermont's Auditor of Accounts and Secretary of State.

== Early life ==
Williams was born October 6, 1791, in Woodstock, Vermont, son of Jesse Willams (1761-1842) and Hannah Palmer (1769-1837) and graduated from the University of Vermont in 1810. He then studied law, attained admission to the bar in 1814 and established a practice in Woodstock. Williams served in the War of 1812 and afterwards continued his military service as a member of the militia. Following his military service Williams resumed practicing law.

== Politics ==
Williams served as Register of Probate for the Hartford district in 1814 and from 1820 to 1822 and 1834 to 1835. In 1819 Williams was elected Auditor of Accounts, serving until 1823. Williams was elected Secretary of State in 1823 and served until 1831. From 1836 to 1840 Williams was Secretary of the Vermont Senate. Originally a National Republican, and later a Whig, Williams was an editor of the Vermont Mercury, a newspaper that advocated Whig policies. Williams succeeded Benjamin Swan as Clerk of the Windsor County Court, and served from 1839 until his death in Woodstock. In October of 1866 he was included on the "Expedition to the 100th Meridian" of the First Transcontinental Railroad. His son Edward H. Williams was unable to participate having been recently selected to Superintend the Pennsylvania Railroad.

== Business career ==
From 1831 to 1834 Williams lived in Montreal and pursued a business career with his brother in law. In 1834 Williams returned to Woodstock and resumed practicing law.

== College administrator ==
Williams was an incorporator of the Vermont Medical College and served for many years as dean of the faculty. In addition, he served as a member of the University of Vermont's Board of Trustees from 1849 to 1853.

== Personal life ==
In 1817, Williams married Mary Ann Wentworth Brown, a member of the Appleton and Wentworth families. They had seven children, Henry Brown Williams, Mary Ann Wentworth Williams, Edward H. Williams, Charles Storrow Williams, Louisa Jane Williams, Norman Williams Jr., and Susan Arnold Williams.

In 1883, Edward H. Williams led an effort to remove from the Williams homestead the main house and surrounding outbuildings, which had fallen into disuse, and erect a library. The facility, named the Norman Williams Public Library, is still in existence and continues to serve the citizens of Woodstock.

Political offices
Preceded by Willis Hall Jr.	Vermont Auditor of Accounts; 1819–1823	Succeeded by David Pierce
Preceded by William Slade Jr.	Vermont Secretary of State; 1823–1831	Succeeded by Timothy Merrill
