= William M. Pingry =

American politician

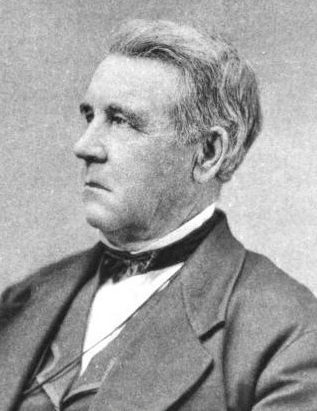

Vermont Auditor of Accounts
- In office 1853–1860
- Governor: John S. Robinson; Stephen Royce; Ryland Fletcher; Hiland Hall
- Preceded by: Frederick E. Woodbridge
- Succeeded by: Jeptha Bradley

Personal details
- Born: May 28, 1806 Salisbury, New Hampshire
- Died: May 1, 1885 May 1, 1885 (aged 78) Perkinsville, Vermont
- Spouse(s): Lucy G. Brown (m. 1836-1865, her death); Lucy C. Richardson (m. 1868-1885, his death)
- Relations: Samuel E. Pingree (nephew)
- Children: 2
- Occupation: Attorney
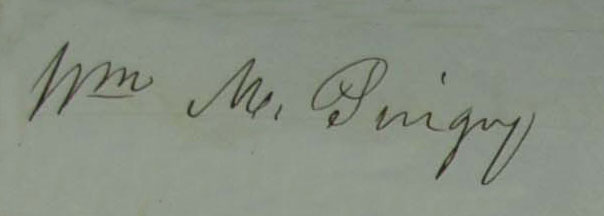
- Signature

William M. Pingry (May 28, 1806 – May 1, 1885) was a Vermont attorney and politician who served as State Auditor.

== Early years ==
William Morrill Pingry was born in Salisbury, New Hampshire on May 28, 1806. He was educated at the local schools and Salisbury Academy, and worked on his family's farm until age 22. He served in the New Hampshire militia, and attained the rank of major. Pingry studied law with Samuel I. Wells of Salisbury and the firm of Shaw & Chandler in Danville, Vermont. He attained admission to the bar in Caledonia County, Vermont in 1832, and began to practice in Waitsfield. Pingry also served as Waitsfield's town clerk.

In 1841 Pingry moved to Windsor County, living first in Springfield and later in Perkinsville. While residing in Perkinsville Pingry served in local offices including justice of the peace, master in chancery and assistant town clerk.

== Career ==
He served as Assistant Judge in both Washington and Windsor Counties. Pingry also served terms in the Vermont House of Representatives and Vermont Senate.

Interested in education, Pingry was a founder and board of trustees member of the Vermont Academy in Saxtons River. A devout Baptist, he served for decades as a church deacon, Sunday school teacher, and Sunday school superintendent.

In 1850 Pingry was a delegate to the Vermont constitutional convention.

From 1853 to 1860 Pingry served as Vermont's Auditor of Accounts.

In 1854 Pingry became Cashier of Bethel's White River Bank, serving until 1857.

Dartmouth College conferred an honorary Master of Arts degree on Pingry in 1860.

Pingry also researched and wrote a family history, 1881's A Genealogical Record of the Descendants of Moses Pengry, of Ipswich, Mass.

== Death ==
He died in Perkinsville on May 1, 1885, after contracting pneumonia.

== Family ==
In 1836, Pingry married Lucy G. Brown of Springfield. She died in 1865, and in 1868 Pingry married Lucy C. Richardson of Waitsfield. With his first wife, Pingry was the father of two children, Mary H. Pingry and Gratia M. Pingry. Mary Pingry was the wife of Dr. O. F. Bigelow of Amherst, Massachusetts. Gratia Pingry married C. C. Boynton of Lebanon, New Hampshire.

Samuel E. Pingree, who received the Medal of Honor during the American Civil War and served as Governor of Vermont, was his nephew.

Political offices
Preceded by Frederick E. Woodbridge	Vermont Auditor of Accounts; 1853–1860	Succeeded by Jeptha Bradley
