= Silas H. Hodges =

American politician (1804–1875)

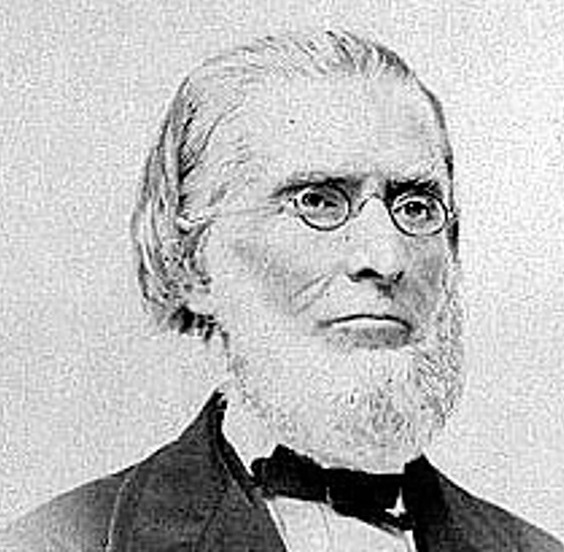
- Hodges, circa 1865

Commissioner of the United States Patent Office
- In office 1852–1853
- Preceded by: Thomas Ewbank
- Succeeded by: Charles Mason

Vermont Auditor of Accounts
- In office 1845–1850
- Governor: William Slade; Horace Eaton; Carlos Coolidge
- Preceded by: David Pierce Jr.
- Succeeded by: Frederick E. Woodbridge

Personal details
- Born: January 12, 1804 Clarendon, Vermont, U.S.
- Died: April 21, 1875 (aged 71) Washington, District of Columbia, U.S.
- Resting place: Evergreen Cemetery, Rutland, Vermont, U.S.
- Party: Whig (before 1856); Republican (from 1856)
- Spouse: 5
- Children: Julia Ann Fay (m. 1830)
- Education: Middlebury College
- Profession: Attorney; Clergyman

Silas H. Hodges (January 12, 1804 – April 21, 1875) was a Vermont attorney, clergyman and politician who served as State Auditor and Commissioner of the U.S. Patent Office.

== Biography ==
Silas Henry Hodges was born in Clarendon, Vermont and was educated at Brandon Academy. He graduated from Middlebury College in 1821, studied law in Rutland, Vermont attained admission to the bar, and practiced in Rutland until 1832.

Hodges began study at Auburn Theological Seminary in 1833 and received his ordination as a minister in the Congregational church in 1835. He was pastor of several churches in southern Vermont until 1841, after which he resumed practicing law in Rutland.

From 1840 to 1860 Hodges served on the Middlebury College Board of Trustees.

In 1845 Hodges was elected State Auditor, serving until 1850.

From 1852 to 1853 Hodges served as United States Commissioner of Patents.

In 1861 Hodges was named Chief Examiner at the U.S. Patent Office, a position he held until his death.

In 1865 Hodges testified during the trial of the Lincoln Assassination conspirators, giving evidence supporting Marcus P. Norton's reputation for veracity. Norton had testified that in March, 1865 a man he later recognized as Samuel Mudd had burst into his room at the National Hotel. Norton claimed the man apologized, saying that he thought the room belonged to a man named Booth. John Wilkes Booth had actually rented the room directly above Norton's. A pre-assassination connection, if proved, would undercut Mudd's claim not to have known who Booth was when he set Booth's broken leg after Booth shot Lincoln.

Hodges died in Washington, D.C., and he was buried in Rutland's Evergreen Cemetery.

Political offices
Preceded by David Pierce	Vermont Auditor of Accounts; 1844–1850	Succeeded by Frederick E. Woodbridge
