= Alexander V. Acebo =

American politician (1927–2019)

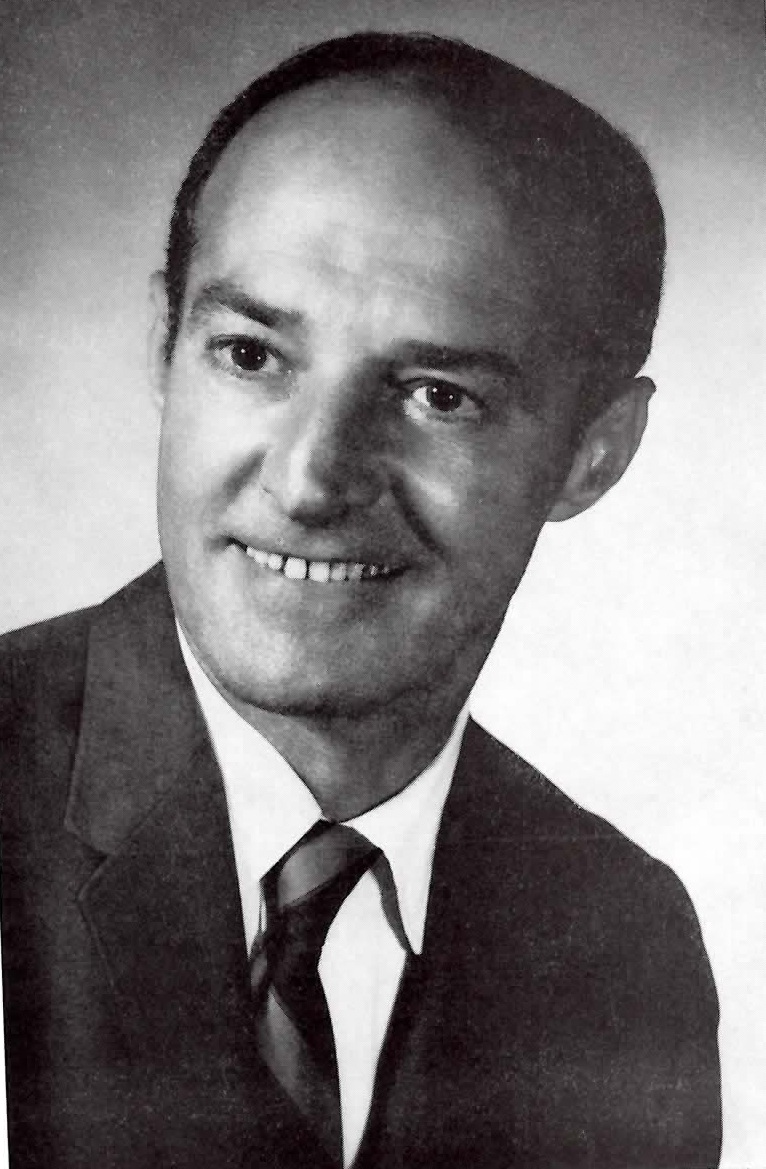
- From the 1971–72 Vermont Legislative Directory and State Manual

Vermont Auditor of Accounts
- In office February 1970 – January 1993
- Governor: Deane C. Davis; Thomas P. Salmon; Richard A. Snelling; Madeleine Kunin; Richard A. Snelling; Howard Dean
- Preceded by: Robert T. King
- Succeeded by: Edward S. Flanagan

Personal details
- Born: September 5, 1927 Barre, Vermont, U.S.
- Died: April 11, 2019 (aged 91) Wells, Maine, U.S.
- Resting place: Hope Cemetery, Barre, Vermont
- Party: Republican
- Spouse(s): Lorraine Nancy Sauter (m. 1950, div. 1974); Helen (Morrie) Franco (m. 1974, div. 1982); Donna K. Murray (m. 1987, div. 1997)
- Children: 3
- Education: Bryant College
- Nickname: Tino

Military service
- Allegiance: United States
- Branch/service: United States Army
- Years of service: 1946-1949
- Rank: Staff Sergeant
- Battles/wars: Occupation of Japan

Alexander Valentino Acebo (September 5, 1927 – April 11, 2019) was an American politician who served for over 20 years as Vermont State Auditor.

== Biography ==
Acebo was born in Barre, Vermont on September 5, 1927. His parents, Fermin Acebo and Lorraine Elvira (Lastra) Acebo, were natives of Spain who immigrated to Vermont. He was educated in Barre and graduated from Spaulding High School in 1946, where he played baseball, basketball, and football. (Note: Some sources indicate Acebo graduated from high school in 1945. These are clearly incorrect, as contemporary newspaper accounts from early 1946 indicate he played on Spaulding High School's basketball team that year. These include "Spaulding at St. Albans in League Game" (Burlington Free Press, January 4, 1946) and "How the Teams Will Line Up for the Opening Games of the Northern Tournament at Barre" (Burlington Free Press, March 1, 1946).)

Acebo served in the United States Army beginning in 1946, including a posting to Japan during the post-World War II occupation. He attained the rank of Staff Sergeant in the Finance Corps, and was discharged in 1949.

In 1952, Acebo graduated from Bryant College in Providence, Rhode Island, receiving a Bachelor of Science degree in business administration. After graduating, Acebo was employed as an accountant at Modern Printing Company in Barre. Active in local civic affairs, Acebo served as a member of the Barre City School Board, including time as the board's chairman.

Acebo began work in the State Auditor's office in 1961. He was serving as chief staff auditor in 1970 when incumbent Robert T. King died in office. Maurice T. Keefe, the Deputy State Auditor, declined Governor Deane Davis's appointment to the State Auditor's position. Davis then offered it to Acebo, who accepted. (Keefe continued to serve as Acebo's Deputy.) Acebo was also selected by the Vermont Republican Party as its nominee for Auditor in the 1970 election.

In November 1970, Acebo was elected to a full term. He won reelection every two years until 1990, and served from September 1970 to January 1993. He did not run for reelection in 1992.

== Retirement and death ==
In retirement Acebo relocated to Wells Beach, Maine. Acebo died in Wells, Maine on April 11, 2019. He was interred at Hope Cemetery in Barre.

== Family ==
In 1950, Acebo married Lorraine Nancy Sauter of Madison, Connecticut. They were the parents of three children, Wendy, Lynn Anne, and Mollie, and divorced in 1974. Later that month, Acebo married Helen (Morrie) Franco (1928–2003). They divorced in 1982, and in 1987, Acebo married Donna K. Murray. They divorced in 1997.

== Notes ==
Party political offices
Preceded by Robert T. King	Republican nominee for Vermont State Auditor; 1970, 1972, 1974, 1976, 1978, 1980, 1982, 1984, 1986, 1988, 1990	Succeeded by Ronald W. Crisman
Preceded by Frederick C. Randlet	Democratic nominee for Vermont State Auditor; 1978, 1980	Succeeded by Frederick C. Randlet
Preceded by Frederick C. Randlet	Democratic nominee for Vermont State Auditor; 1984, 1986	Succeeded by J. Spencer Rose
Political offices
Preceded by Robert T. King	Vermont Auditor of Accounts; 1970 – 1993	Succeeded by Edward S. Flanagan
