= Timothy Merrill =

American politician (1781–1836)

Timothy Merrill (March 16, 1781 – July 27, 1836) was an American lawyer and politician who served as Secretary of State of Vermont from 1831 to 1836.

== Biography ==
Timothy Merrill was born in Farmington, Connecticut on March 16, 1781, the son of James Merrill and Jerusha Seymour. He attended schools in Farmington. He later studied law in Bennington, Vermont with his brother Orsamus Cook Merrill, and was admitted to the bar. He then moved to Rutland, where he practiced with Robert Temple. In 1809, Merrill moved to Montpelier, where he continued to practice law.

In 1811 and 1812, Merrill was elected to the Vermont House of Representatives. In the same year he was also appointed state's attorney for the newly formed Jefferson County, which was later renamed Washington County. He was reelected in 1812, and again from 1822 to 1829. In 1815, he was appointed engrossing clerk of the Vermont House. In 1822, he was appointed clerk of the House of Representatives, and he served until 1831.

Merrill joined the Anti-Masonic Party when it was formed in 1828. In 1831 he was elected Secretary of State, and he served in this position until his death. He died in Montpelier on July 27, 1836.

== Family ==
Merrill was married to Clara Fassett. The couple had five children, including Ferrand, who served as his father's deputy, and later served as Secretary of State himself; Edwin, who served as Montpelier's postmaster before moving to Winchendon, Massachusetts; Clara, who died in 1842; and Timothy, who practiced law and served as Washington County's judge of probate. One of his sons died in infancy.

Political offices
Preceded by Norman Williams	Secretary of State of Vermont; 1831–1836	Succeeded by Chauncey L. Knapp
