= Thomas M. Salmon =

American politician (born 1963)

Tom Salmon

29th Vermont Auditor of Accounts
- In office 2007–2013
- Governor: Jim Douglas; Peter Shumlin
- Preceded by: Randy Brock
- Succeeded by: Doug Hoffer

Personal details
- Born: July 28, 1963 (age 62) Bellows Falls, Vermont, U.S.
- Party: Democratic (until 2009); Republican (2009–present)
- Parent(s): Thomas P. Salmon; Madeleine G. Savaria
- Education: Boston College (BS)

Thomas M. Salmon (born July 28, 1963) is an American politician who was Vermont Auditor of Accounts from 2007 to 2013. He did not run for reelection in 2012, and was succeeded by Democrat/Progressive Douglas R. Hoffer. He was elected in 2006 as a Democrat and then became a Republican in 2009.

== Early life ==
Salmon was born in Bellows Falls, Vermont. He graduated from Bellows Falls Union High School and attended Worcester Academy as a postgraduate year. He holds a Bachelor of Science degree in accounting from Boston College.

Salmon worked for Coopers and Lybrand (now PricewaterhouseCoopers) in Hartford and Los Angeles, and became a Certified Public Accountant in 1993.

He taught school in the Los Angeles Unified School District from 1992 to 2002, and is a licensed English teacher for grades 7 to 12 in both California and Vermont. From 2004 to 2005 he was a Special Education teacher at Bellows Falls Union High School, working with emotionally challenged boys.

== Political career ==
Salmon served on the Rockingham, Vermont Selectboard beginning in 2006.

In the 2006 Vermont Auditor of Accounts election, Salmon challenged Republican incumbent Randolph D. "Randy" Brock. With over 250,000 votes cast, the initial vote tally put Brock ahead by just 137 votes. Salmon requested a recount, and on December 21, 2006, he was declared the winner by a margin of 102 votes. This was one of the closest election victories in Vermont history, and the first time in the state's history that a statewide election's initially reported result was overturned by a recount.

Salmon was sworn in as state auditor on January 4, 2007. He was reelected in 2008 as a Democrat. He became a Republican in 2009 and won reelection in 2010 as the Republican nominee. In 2011 he became a Certified Fraud Examiner. He did not run for reelection in 2012.

== Military service ==
Salmon is a noncommissioned officer in the Navy Reserve and was deployed to Iraq in 2008. He ran successfully for reelection while serving overseas.

== Driving while intoxicated arrest ==
In 2009 Salmon was arrested for driving while intoxicated. His blood alcohol content was .086, over the legal limit of .080. He pleaded guilty and paid a fine, and later created public service announcements promoting safe driving.

== Later career ==
After leaving office in January, 2013, Salmon worked briefly as director of a special audit unit for the Massachusetts Department of Transportation. He left to accept a position in Washington, D.C. as the Assistant Inspector General for Audit Services at the Office of Inspector General in the United States Department of Health and Human Services. At HHS he is responsible for audit services in eight regional offices across the country.

== Personal life ==
He is the son of former Vermont Governor Thomas P. Salmon.

== See also ==
- List of American politicians who switched parties in office

Party political offices
Preceded by Elizabeth M. Ready	Democratic nominee for Vermont State Auditor; 2006, 2008	Succeeded by Doug Hoffer
Vacant Title last held by Randy Brock	Republican nominee for Vermont State Auditor; 2010	Succeeded by Vincent Illuzzi
Political offices
Preceded by Randolph D. "Randy" Brock	Vermont Auditor of Accounts; 2007-2013	Succeeded by Doug Hoffer
