= Alexander Hutchinson (politician) =

Alexander Hutchinson (July 4, 1764 – February 25, 1853) was a Vermont politician who served as State Auditor.

Hutchinson was born in Grafton, Massachusetts, a son of Rev. Aaron and Margery (Carter) Hutchinson. His siblings included Titus Hutchinson.

A lifelong bachelor, Hutchinson resided in Woodstock, Vermont, where he became a successful merchant and had a reputation as an eccentric.

Hutchinson was a veteran of the American Revolution, responding with other members of his militia unit in the aftermath of the Royalton Raid.

He served in local offices, including Register of Probate and postmaster.

From 1806 to 1813 and 1815 to 1817 Hutchinson was Vermont's State Auditor.

Hutchinson died in Pomfret, Vermont. He was buried at Cushing Cemetery in Woodstock.

Political offices
Preceded by Benjamin Emmons Jr.	Vermont Auditor of Accounts; 1806–1813	Succeeded by Job Lyman
Preceded by Job Lyman	Vermont Auditor of Accounts; 1815–1817	Succeeded by Willis Hall Jr.
