= Tappan Wentworth =

American politician (1802–1875)

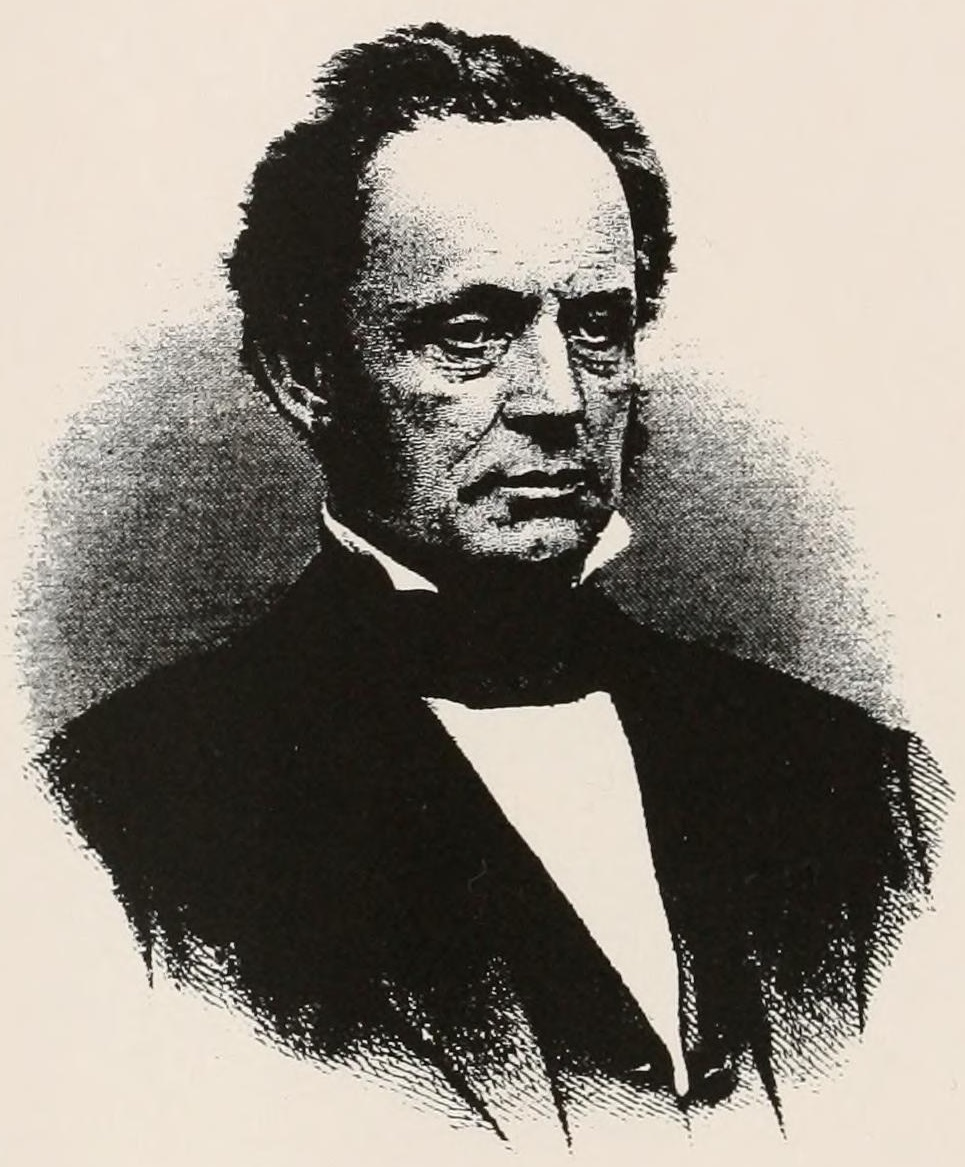

Member of the U.S. House of Representatives from Massachusetts's 8th district
- In office March 4, 1853 – March 3, 1855
- Preceded by: Horace Mann
- Succeeded by: Chauncey L. Knapp

Personal details
- Born: Theodore Trapplan Michael Wentworth; February 24, 1802 Dover, New Hampshire, U.S.
- Died: June 12, 1875 (aged 73) Lowell, Massachusetts, U.S.
- Resting place: Lowell Cemetery
- Party: Whig
- Occupation: Lawyer

Theodore Trapplan "Tappan" Michael Wentworth (February 24, 1802 – June 12, 1875) was an American lawyer and politician who served one term as a U.S. representative from Massachusetts from 1853 to 1855.

== Early life and career ==
Wentworth was born in Dover, New Hampshire, on February 24, 1802. He received a liberal schooling, and worked as a store clerk in Portsmouth, New Hampshire, and South Berwick, Maine.

He then studied law with William Burleigh, was admitted to the bar in 1826, and commenced practice in York County, Maine.

== Political career ==
He moved to Lowell, Massachusetts, in 1833 and continued the practice of law. Wentworth was a member of the committee which drafted Lowell's city charter, and was a member of the Lowell city council from 1836 to 1841, and was the council president beginning in 1837.

=== Massachusetts legislature ===
He served in the Massachusetts House of Representatives in 1851, 1859, 1860, 1863, and 1864, and in the Massachusetts State Senate in 1848, 1849, 1865, and 1866.

=== Congress ===
Wentworth was elected as a Whig to the Thirty-third Congress, defeating Henry Wilson. He served from March 4, 1853, to March 3, 1855, and was an unsuccessful candidate for reelection in 1854 to the Thirty-fourth Congress.

== Later career ==
After leaving Congress, Wentworth returned to practicing law. He was also active in several business ventures including railroads and banking, and served as president of Rhode Island's National Rubber Company.

== Death and burial ==
He died in Lowell on June 12, 1875, and was interred in Lowell Cemetery.

== Family ==
In 1842 Wentworth married Anne McNeil, a daughter of Solomon McNeil and niece of John McNeil Jr. John McNeil was married to Elizabeth Pierce, the daughter of Benjamin Pierce, and the sister of Benjamin Kendrick Pierce and Franklin Pierce. Because of the family connection to Franklin Pierce, who was president during Wentworth's House term, Wentworth was able to maintain cordial relations with Democrats despite disagreeing with them politically. As a result, he was sometimes employed by Whigs as a negotiator to create compromises with congressional Democrats and the Pierce administration.

U.S. House of Representatives
Preceded by Horace Mann	Member of the U.S. House of Representatives from Massachusetts's 8th congressional district 1853–1855	Succeeded by Chauncey L. Knapp
