= Franklin D. Hale =

American politician

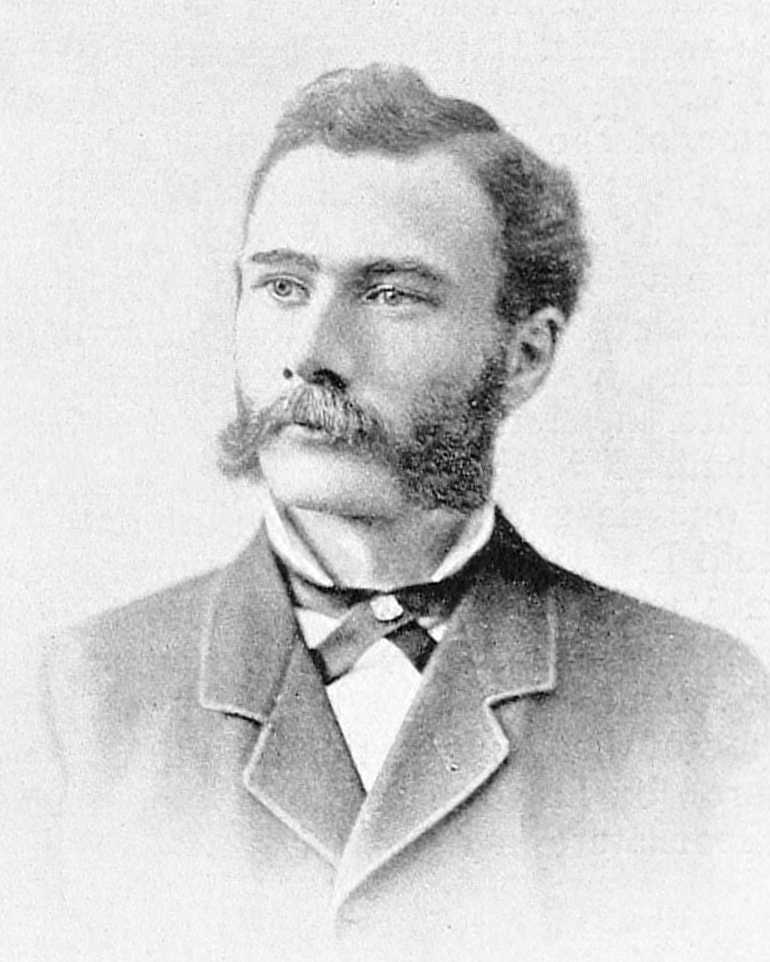
- From 1894's Men of Vermont, by Jacob G. Ullery

18th Vermont Auditor of Accounts
- In office 1892–1898
- Governor: Levi K. Fuller; Urban A. Woodbury; Josiah Grout
- Preceded by: E. Henry Powell
- Succeeded by: Orion M. Barber

Member of the Vermont Senate from Essex County
- In office 1886–1888
- Preceded by: Samuel D. Hobson
- Succeeded by: Zophar M. Mansur

Member of the Vermont House of Representatives from Lunenburg
- In office 1923–1925
- Preceded by: Mark D. Bowker
- Succeeded by: John H. Cole
- In office 1898–1902
- Preceded by: Uriah Knapp
- Succeeded by: Mark D. Bowker
- In office 1884–1886
- Preceded by: Charles H. Cole
- Succeeded by: George G. Temple

State's Attorney of Essex County, Vermont
- In office 1901–1902
- Preceded by: Henry W. Lund
- Succeeded by: Henry W. Lund
- In office 1888–1891
- Preceded by: Zophar M. Mansur
- Succeeded by: Henry W. Lund
- In office 1883–1885
- Preceded by: Albro F. Nichols
- Succeeded by: Zophar M. Mansur

Personal details
- Born: March 7, 1854 Barnet, Vermont, U.S.
- Died: April 21, 1940 (aged 86) Lyndon Center, Vermont
- Resting place: Riverside Cemetery, Lunenburg, Vermont
- Party: Republican
- Spouse(s): Adeline Louisa Silsby (m. 1881); Jennie Anna Silsby (m. 1907)
- Children: 4
- Education: University of Michigan Law School
- Profession: Attorney; Diplomat

Franklin D. Hale (March 7, 1854 – April 21, 1940) was a Vermont politician who served as State Auditor and want on to a career as a diplomat.

== Early life ==
Franklin Darius Hale was born in Barnet, Vermont March 7, 1854, a son of Sprague T. Hale and Nancy May (Moulton) Hale. He was educated in Concord, Vermont and attended high school, first in Northfield, and then at St. Johnsbury Academy. He was raised on his family's farm, and after high school he received his teaching credentials and taught school in Colebrook, New Hampshire, Dalton, New Hampshire, Waitsfield, Vermont, and Lunenburg, Vermont.

In 1877, Hale graduated from the University of Michigan Law School with his LL.B. degree. He was subsequently admitted to the bar, and practiced law first in Lewiston, Maine, and then in Lunenburg. Hale was also active in several businesses, including serving as president of the Lunenburg Manufacturing Company, an enterprise which operated a number of divisions, including a sawmill and a creamery.

== Start of career ==
A Republican, Hale held local offices including town meeting moderator, auditor, and selectman. He served as Essex County State's Attorney from 1883 to 1885, 1888 to 1891, and 1901 to 1902. Hale was a member of the Vermont House of Representatives from 1884 to 1886, the Vermont Senate from 1886 to 1888, and the Vermont House again from 1898 to 1901 and 1923 to 1925.

From 1891 to 1892 Hale was town site trustee for Oklahoma City in the Oklahoma Territory. Town site trustees were appointees of the Secretary of the Interior, and were responsible to subdivide federally held land into townships as new white settlers moved into the territory.

Hale served as Vermont's Auditor of Accounts from 1892 to 1898. From 1899 to 1900 Hale was Chief Clerk to the Treasurer during the United States Military Government in Cuba that followed the end of the Spanish–American War.

== Later career ==
In the early 1900s Hale passed the exam to join the diplomatic corps and embarked on a consular career. He served as U.S. Consul in Coaticook, Quebec, Canada from 1902 to 1908. He served in Charlottetown, Prince Edward Island, Canada from 1908 to 1909. Hale was appointed Consul in Trinidad in 1909 and served until 1912. From 1912 to 1917 Hale was Consul in Huddersfield, England.

== Personal life ==
In 1881, Hale married Adeline "Addie" L. Silsby. They were the parents of four children, Susan Belle (died young), Susan May, Charles Silsby, and Bernard Franklin. Adeline Hale died in 1906, and in 1907, Hale married Jennie A. Silsby, the sister of his first wife.

Hale was also a poet, and authored 1929's Reveries of Vermont.

Hale died in Lyndon Center, Vermont, on April 21, 1940. His funeral took place at Lunenburg's Congregational church, and he was buried at the nearby Riverside Cemetery.

Party political offices
Preceded by E. Henry Powell	Republican nominee for Vermont State Auditor; 1892, 1894, 1896	Succeeded by Orion M. Barber
Political offices
Preceded by E. Henry Powell	Vermont Auditor of Accounts; 1892–1898	Succeeded by Orion M. Barber
