= David Pierce Jr. =

American judge

David Pierce Jr. (March 26, 1786 – August 16, 1872) was an American lawyer and politician who served in Vermont as State Auditor and as a state court judge.

== Biography ==
Pierce was born in Southborough, Massachusetts, on March 26, 1786, and raised in Barnard, Vermont.

He graduated from Dartmouth College in 1811. He then taught school, studied law with Charles Marsh, was admitted to the bar in 1816 and established a law practice in Woodstock, Vermont.

Pierce was also interested in inventing and other scientific pursuits, and items he patented include a gold separator, a planing machine and a method for constructing watertight ship's holds.

In 1823, Pierce was elected State Auditor, and he served until 1845.

Pierce was named a judge of the court of common pleas in 1836, and he served until 1846.

Pierce died in Woodstock, Vermont, on August 16, 1872.

Political offices
Preceded by Norman Williams	Vermont Auditor of Accounts; 1823–1844	Succeeded by Silas H. Hodges
