= Frederick E. Woodbridge =

American politician

Frederick Enoch Woodbridge
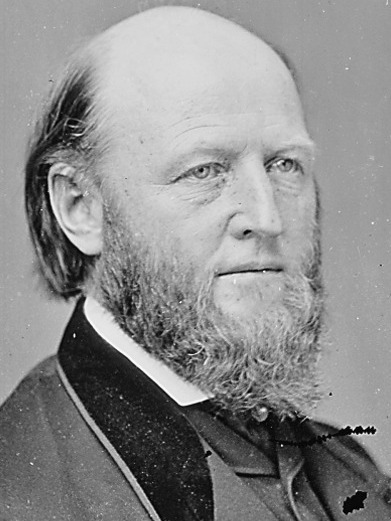

Member of the U.S. House of Representatives from Vermont's 1st district
- In office March 4, 1863 – March 3, 1869
- Preceded by: Eliakim Persons Walton
- Succeeded by: Charles W. Willard

11th Vermont Auditor of Accounts
- In office 1850-1853
- Governor: Charles K. Williams; Erastus Fairbanks
- Preceded by: Silas H. Hodges
- Succeeded by: William M. Pingry

Member of the Vermont Senate from the Addison District
- In office 1859-1861

Member of the Vermont House of Representatives
- In office 1849; 1857–1858

Mayor of Vergennes, Vermont
- In office 1844-1849

Member of the Vergennes City Council
- In office 1843-1844

Personal details
- Born: August 29, 1818 Vergennes, Vermont, US
- Died: April 25, 1888 (aged 69) Vergennes, Vermont, US
- Party: National Republican until 1840s Republican after 1855
- Spouse: Mary Parkhurst Woodbridge
- Children: Enoch Day Woodbridge
- Profession: Politician, Lawyer

Frederick Enoch Woodbridge (August 29, 1818 – April 25, 1888) was a nineteenth-century politician and lawyer from Vermont. He served as a U.S. representative from Vermont.

== Biography ==
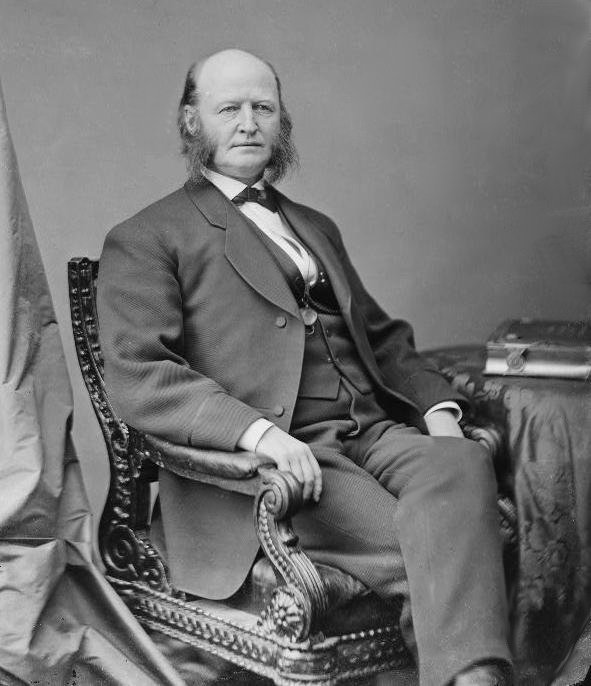

Woodbridge was born in Vergennes, Vermont, son of Enoch D. Woodbridge and Clara (Strong) Woodbridge. His grandfather Enoch Woodbridge served as Chief Justice of the Vermont Supreme Court, and his grandfather Samuel Strong and great-grandfather John Strong, were prominent military and political leaders of early Vermont. He graduated from the University of Vermont in 1840. He studied law with his father and was admitted to the bar in 1843. He began the practice of law in Vergennes.

Woodbridge was elected as a city councilor for two years and the mayor of Vergennes for five. He later served as a member of the Vermont House of Representatives in 1849, 1857 and 1858, and was the Vermont Auditor of Accounts from 1850 until 1852. He was a prosecuting attorney from 1854 to 1858. He engaged in the construction of railroads and was vice-president of the Rutland and Washington Railroad. Woodbridge served in the Vermont Senate in 1860 and 1861, serving as president pro tempore in the latter year.

Woodbridge was elected as a Republican to the United States House of Representatives in 1862, serving from 1863 to 1869. He was a major proponent of the Expatriation Act of 1868.

After leaving Congress, Woodbridge resumed practicing law in Vergennes and became mayor in 1879. Stephen Bates, his coachman and an emancipated slave, served as sheriff of Vergennes for 25 years.

Woodbridge died in Vergennes on April 25, 1888. He is interred in Prospect Cemetery in Vergennes.

== Personal life ==
Woodbridge was married to Mary Parkhurst Woodbridge. Their son Enoch Day Woodbridge was a surgeon at Bellevue Hospital.

Political offices
Preceded by Silas H. Hodges	Vermont Auditor of Accounts; 1850 – 1853	Succeeded by William M. Pingry
U.S. House of Representatives
Preceded by Eliakim P. Walton	Member of the U.S. House of Representatives from Vermont's 1st congressional district March 4, 1863 – March 3, 1869	Succeeded by Charles W. Willard
