= David V. Anderson =

American politician (1899–1979)

David Verner Anderson
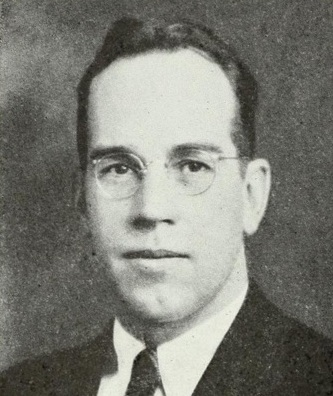
- Anderson after his 1940 election as Vermont Auditor
- Born: 4 October 1899; Quincy, Massachusetts, U.S.
- Died: September 3, 1979 (aged 79); Montpelier, Vermont
- Education: Norwich University

David Verner Anderson (September 4, 1899 – September 3, 1979) was a Vermont politician who served as Auditor of Accounts.

== Biography ==
Anderson was born in Quincy, Massachusetts, on September 4, 1899, and his family relocated to Montpelier, Vermont, in 1901. He served in the military during World War I as a member of the Student Army Training Corps and Reserve Officers Corps, and later became a member of the American Legion.

He graduated from Norwich University in 1922 and was a member the Sigma Phi Epsilon fraternity. He served as a Trustee of Norwich University from 1961 to 1965.

In 1927 Anderson was appointed as Vermont's Deputy State Auditor, serving until 1941.

On August 24, 1929, Anderson married Iola Florence Bagley in Montpelier. Mrs. Anderson was born on March 14, 1905, and died on September 19, 1970.

Anderson was the successful Republican nominee for Auditor in 1940. He won reelection every two years until 1962 and served from 1941 until the expiration of his final term in 1965.

In 1964 Anderson lost his bid for reelection, losing to Jay H. Gordon, the first time the Republicans had lost the office since the mid-1850s.

In 1966 Anderson was the unsuccessful Republican nominee for Auditor, losing to Gordon.

Anderson died in Montpelier on September 3, 1979, and his remains were cremated.

Party political offices
Preceded by Benjamin Gates	Republican nominee for Vermont State Auditor; 1940, 1942, 1944, 1946, 1948, 1950, 1952, 1954, 1956, 1958, 1960, 1962, 1964, 1966	Succeeded by Robert T. King
Political offices
Preceded by Benjamin Gates	Vermont Auditor of Accounts; 1941 – 1965	Succeeded by Jay H. Gordon
