= Steve Berry (Vermont politician) =

American politician (born 1950)

Steve Berry (born August 15, 1950) is an American politician and minister from the state of Vermont. A member of the Democratic Party, he represented the Bennington-4 district in the Vermont House of Representatives from 2015 to 2017. He is also an author and an ordained minister of the United Church of Christ.

Berry lost re-election to his state house seat in 2016, being succeeded by Republican Brian Keefe. In 2024, he ran concurrently in the state's U.S. Senate election and to represent Bennington in the Vermont Senate, both as an independent candidate. He lost both races.
