= Ed Flanagan (politician) =

American politician (1950–2017)

Edward S. Flanagan
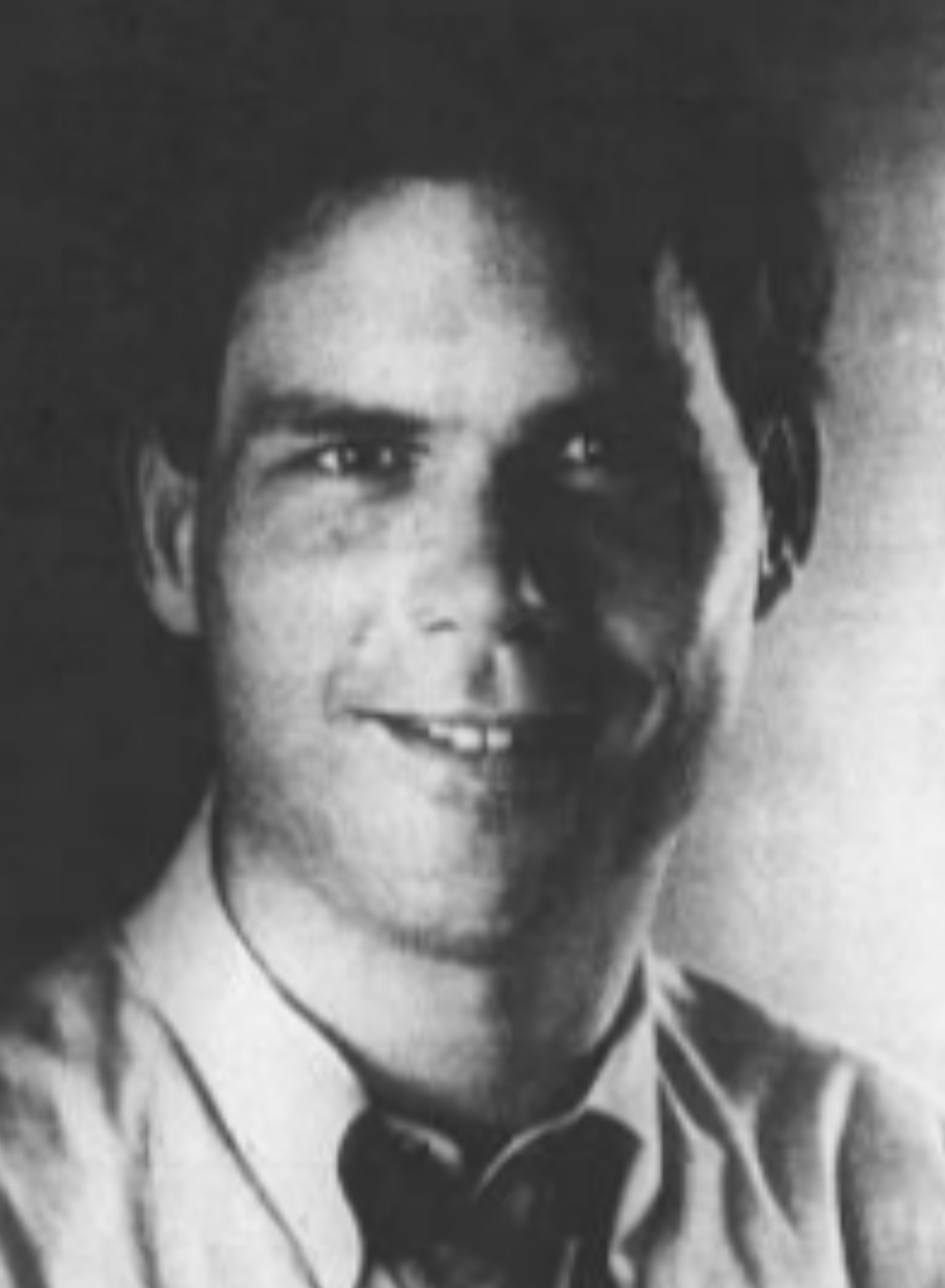
- Flanagan in 1988

Member of the Vermont Senate from the Chittenden County district
- In office January 2005 – January 2011

Vermont Auditor of Accounts
- In office January 1993 – January 2001
- Governor: Howard Dean
- Preceded by: Alexander V. Acebo
- Succeeded by: Elizabeth M. Ready

Personal details
- Born: December 18, 1950 Washington, D.C., U.S.
- Died: November 3, 2017 (aged 66) New Hampshire, U.S.
- Party: Democratic

Edward S. Flanagan (December 18, 1950 – November 3, 2017) was an American politician from Vermont. He served as Vermont State Auditor from 1993 to 2001 and as a state senator from 2005 to 2011.

== Early life ==
Flanagan was born in Washington, D.C., the son of Bernard Lawrence Flanagan (1919-1970) and Margaret (Sawyer) Flanagan. When Flanagan was born, his father was employed on the staff of U.S. Senator George Aiken. He graduated from the University of Pennsylvania with a B.A. in history and political science in 1973, and earned a J.D. from Harvard Law School in 1976.

His older brother, Robert Flanagan, also entered politics, but as a Republican serving in the Maryland House of Delegates and as that state's Secretary of Transportation from 2003 - 2007.

== Start of career ==
Beginning in 1977, Flanagan served in the Carter Administration as a policy analyst under Secretary of Health, Education, and Welfare Joseph Califano, before beginning the private practice of law. He began to reside permanently in Vermont in 1988, and was an unsuccessful candidate that year for Vermont Attorney General.

== Vermont State Auditor ==
Flanagan served as Vermont's State Auditor from 1993 through 2001, becoming the first openly gay, statewide-elected official in the United States when he came out in 1995, before his 1996 reelection. Flanagan was the Democratic nominee in the U.S. Senate contest in 2000, becoming the first openly gay individual to be nominated by a major party as a candidate for the United States Senate. In that election, Flanagan was defeated by incumbent U.S. Senator Jim Jeffords. His U.S. Senate campaign, like many of his campaigns before and since, won the backing of the Gay & Lesbian Victory Fund. In 2002, Flanagan made a bid for the Democratic nomination for State Treasurer but was defeated by Senator Jeb Spaulding, who went on to win the office.

== Vermont Senate ==
In 2004, Flanagan was elected to the Vermont State Senate, representing the Chittenden senate district.

In November 2005, he was seriously injured in a car accident during a period of particularly bad weather; his car slid into a ravine off Interstate 89 in Richmond. He was not easily observable from the roadway, and hung upside down in subfreezing temperatures for 18 hours before someone spotted his car and he was rescued. He spent three weeks in a coma, and six months in the hospital.

Flanagan returned to the statehouse in early May 2006; some observers later questioned whether Flanagan was suffering from the effects of a traumatic brain injury, but he won reelection in 2006 and 2008.

On December 4, 2006, Flanagan had another car accident when he went off the road while turning onto I-89 in South Burlington. He later stopped driving and began to use an electric bicycle for local transportation. Flanagan did not seek reelection to the Senate in 2010.

== Retirement and death ==
In failing health for the last decade of his life, Flanagan died on November 3, 2017, aged 66, at a nursing home in New Hampshire.

== See also ==
- Members of the Vermont Senate, 2005-2006 session
- Members of the Vermont Senate, 2007-2008 session

Party political offices
Preceded by Jeffrey Amestoy	Democratic nominee for Vermont Attorney General; 1988	Succeeded by Jeffrey Amestoy
Preceded by Ronald L. Boucher	Democratic nominee for Vermont State Auditor; 1992, 1994, 1996, 1998	Succeeded by Elizabeth M. Ready
Preceded by Jan Backus	Democratic nominee for U.S. Senator from Vermont (Class 1); 2000	Succeeded by Bernie Sanders
Political offices
Preceded by Alexander V. Acebo	Vermont Auditor of Accounts; 1993–2001	Succeeded by Elizabeth M. Ready
