= Brian Keefe (politician) =

American politician

Member of the Vermont House of Representatives from the Bennington-4 district
- In office 2017–2019
- Preceded by: Steve Berry
- Succeeded by: Kathleen James

Personal details
- Born: Montpelier, Vermont, U.S.
- Party: Democratic
- Children: 2
- Education: Loyola University New Orleans (BA)

Brian Keefe is an American politician who served in the Vermont House of Representatives from 2017 to 2019.
