= 2024 United States Senate election in Vermont =

- November 5, 2024
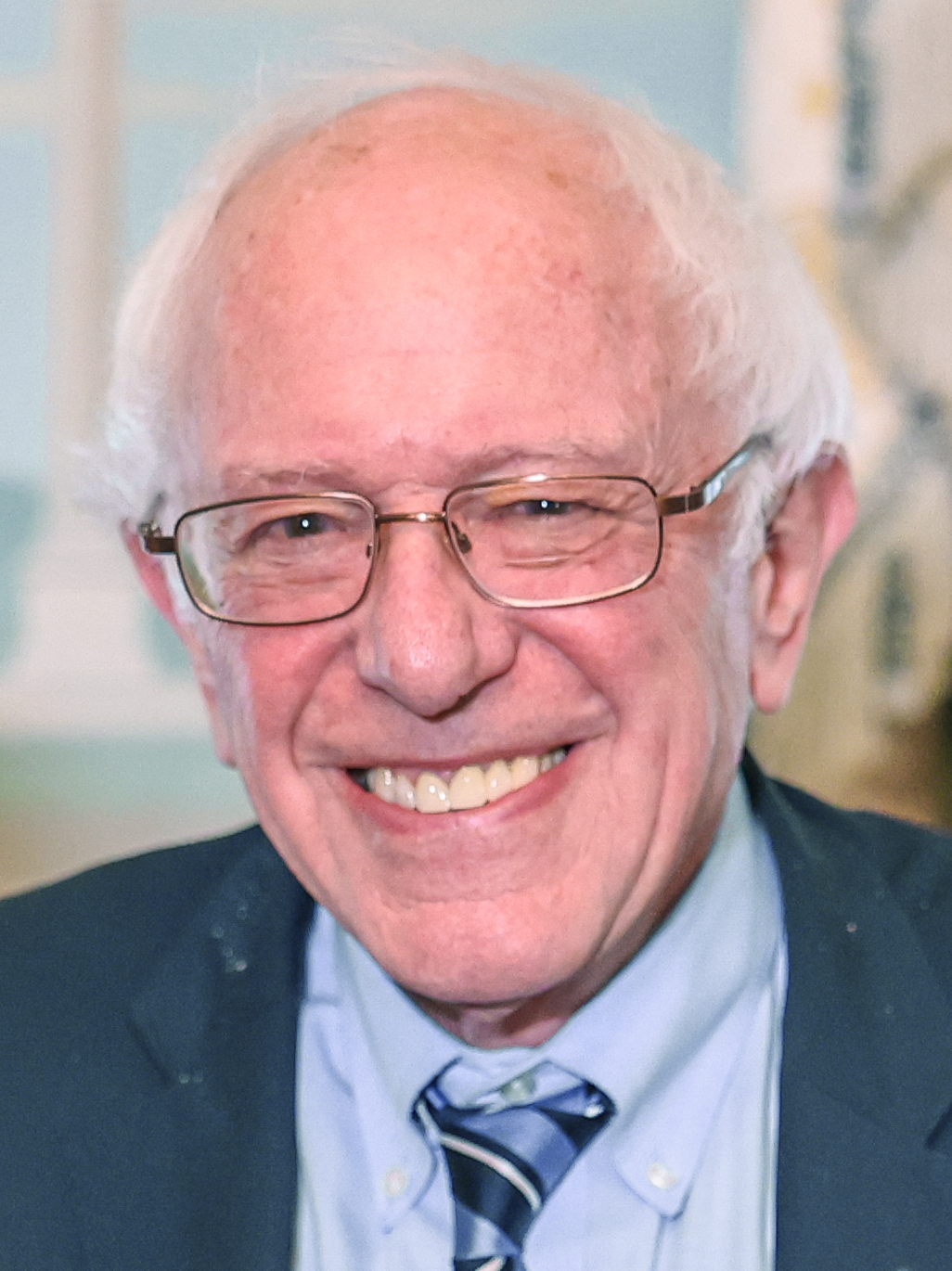

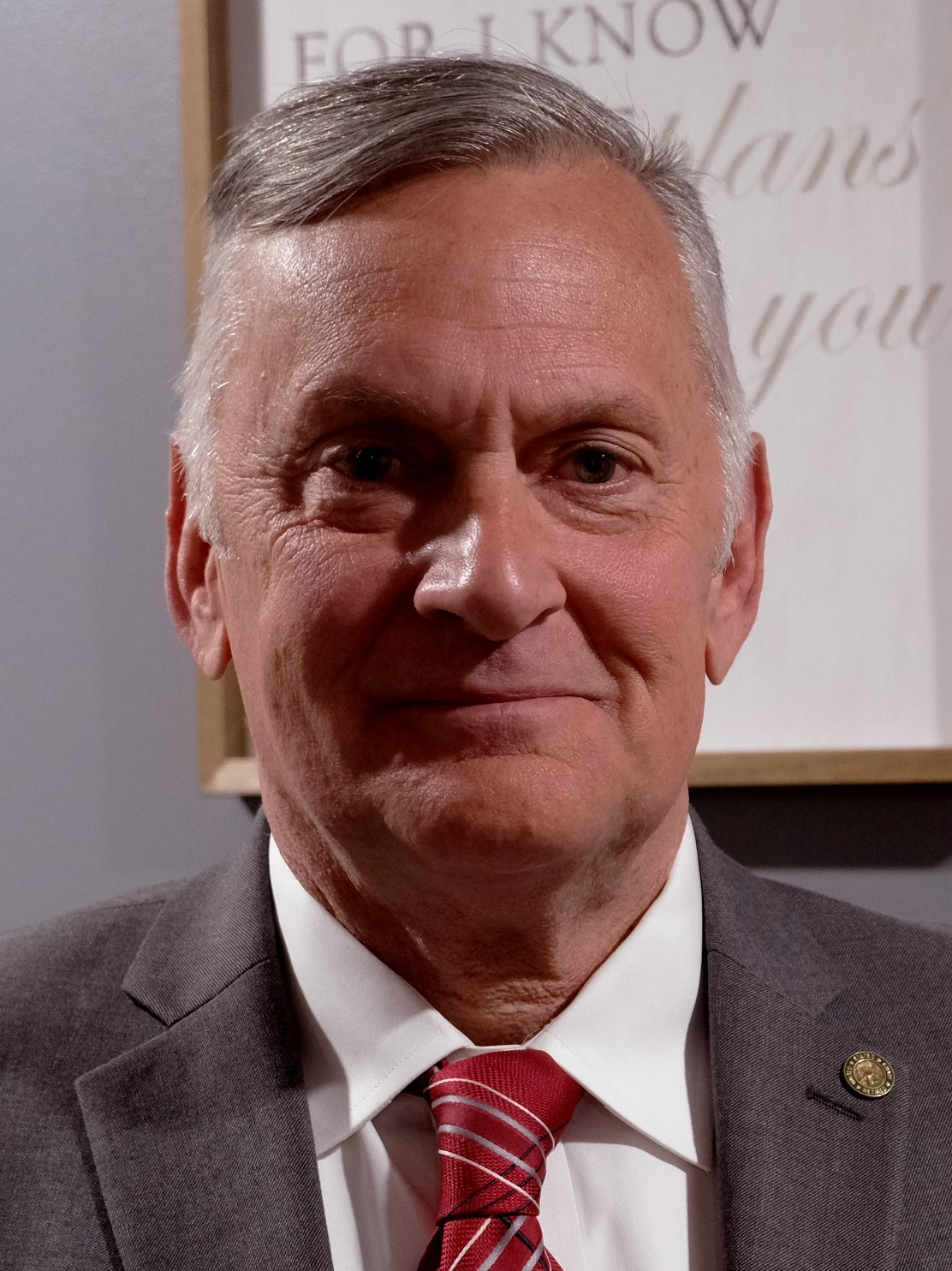
Nominee	Bernie Sanders	Gerald Malloy
Party	Independent	Republican
Popular vote	229,429	116,512
Percentage	63.16%	32.07%
- Sanders: 40–50% 50–60% 60–70% 70–80% 80–90% Malloy: 40–50% 50–60% 60–70% Tie: 40–50% No data
U.S. senator before election
Bernie Sanders
Independent
Elected U.S. Senator
Bernie Sanders
Independent

The 2024 United States Senate election in Vermont was held on November 5, 2024, to elect a member of the United States Senate to represent the state of Vermont. Primary elections took place on August 13, 2024. Incumbent independent Senator Bernie Sanders won re-election to a fourth term, defeating the Republican nominee, businessman Gerald Malloy.

Sanders filed paperwork to run for re-election in 2019. On January 8, 2024, he stated he would decide whether or not to seek re-election in the "near future". On May 6, Sanders formally announced that he would run for re-election.

Sanders won by a margin of 31.09 percentage points, making it his closest Senate race to date despite achieving his largest vote total ever in the state. Sanders performed similarly to Kamala Harris in the concurrent 2024 United States presidential election in Vermont, but significantly underperformed governor Phil Scott in the concurrent gubernatorial election. Harris won by a slightly larger margin of 31.51 percentage points but did not carry Orleans County, unlike Sanders, while Scott won his re-election bid by 51.60 percentage points and carried every county. Independent Democrat Steve Berry won 2.19 percent of the vote.

Sanders lost Essex County, marking his first election since 1994 where he lost any Vermont county, and the first in his Senate career.

Republicans have not won a Senate race in Vermont since 2000.

== Independents ==
=== Candidates ===
==== Declared ====
- Steve Berry, former Democratic state representative (2015–2017)
- Bernie Sanders, incumbent U.S. senator (2007–present)

=== Endorsements ===
Bernie Sanders

Organizations

- Feminist Majority PAC
- Planned Parenthood Action Fund
- Population Connection Action Fund

Labor unions

- Association of Flight Attendants
- United Farm Workers

Political parties

- Vermont Progressive Party

== Republican primary ==
=== Candidates ===
==== Nominee ====
- Gerald Malloy, businessman and nominee for U.S. Senate in 2022

=== Results ===
Republican primary results
Party	Candidate	Votes	%
Republican	Gerald Malloy	20,383	96.4%
Write-in		772	3.6%
Total votes		21,155	100.0%

== Third-party candidates ==
=== Declared ===
- Mark Greenstein (Epic), businessman and perennial candidate
- Matt Hill (Libertarian), accountant
- Justin Schoville (Green Mountain Peace and Justice), chair of the Green Mountain Peace and Justice Party

== General election ==
=== Predictions ===
Source	Ranking	As of
The Cook Political Report	Solid I	November 9, 2023
Inside Elections	Solid I	November 9, 2023
Sabato's Crystal Ball	Safe I	November 9, 2023
Decision Desk HQ/The Hill	Safe I	June 14, 2024
Elections Daily	Safe I	May 4, 2023
CNalysis	Solid I	November 21, 2023
RealClearPolitics	Solid I	August 5, 2024
Split Ticket	Safe I	October 23, 2024
538	Safe I	October 23, 2024

=== Fundraising ===
Campaign finance reports as of June 30, 2024
Candidate	Raised	Spent	Cash on hand
Bernie Sanders (I)	$33,701,563	$31,717,985	$10,289,572
Gerald Malloy (R)	$150,048	$60,752	$90,156
Source: Federal Election Commission

=== Polling ===
Poll source	Date(s) administered	Sample size (Note: Key: A – all adults RV – registered voters LV – likely voters V – unclear)	Margin of error	Bernard Sanders (I)	Gerald Malloy (R)	Other	Undecided
University of New Hampshire	October 29 – November 2, 2024	1,167 (LV)	± 2.9%	64%	27%	2% (Note: Hill (L) and Berry (I) with 1%)	6%
University of New Hampshire	August 15–19, 2024	924 (LV)	± 3.2%	66%	25%	5% (Note: Schoville (GMPJP) with 2%; Hill (L) with 1%; Berry (I) with <1%; "Another candidate" with 2%)	4%

=== Results ===
2024 United States Senate election in Vermont
Party	Candidate	Votes	%	±%
Independent	Bernie Sanders (incumbent)	229,429	63.16%	−4.28
Republican	Gerald Malloy	116,512	32.07%	+4.60
Independent	Steve Berry	7,941	2.19%	N/A
Libertarian	Matt Hill	4,530	1.25%	N/A
Green Mountain Peace and Justice	Justin Schoville	3,339	0.92%	+0.49
E.P.I.C.	Mark Stewart Greenstein	1,104	0.30%	N/A
Write-in		398	0.11%	+0.00
Total votes		363,253	100.0%	N/A
Independent hold				

==== By county ====
By county

County	Bernie Sanders Independent		Gerald Malloy Republican		Various candidates Other parties	
County	#	%	#	%	#	%
Addison	14,407	64.46%	7,038	31.49%	906	4.05%
Bennington	11,831	58.46%	6,597	32.6%	1,809	8.94%
Caledonia	8,853	54.07%	6,556	40.04%	964	5.89%
Chittenden	70,006	73.27%	21,966	22.99%	3,567	3.74%
Essex	1,442	43.02%	1,677	50.03%	233	6.95%
Franklin	13,282	50.26%	12,021	45.49%	1,123	4.25%
Grand Isle	2,847	57.69%	1,910	38.7%	178	3.61%
Lamoille	9,444	64.66%	4,465	30.57%	696	4.77%
Orange	10,126	57.99%	6,481	37.11%	855	4.9%
Orleans	7,182	49.62%	6,619	45.73%	674	4.65%
Rutland	16,838	50.07%	15,040	44.72%	1,753	5.21%
Washington	23,979	68.81%	9,401	26.98%	1,470	4.21%
Windham	17,585	69.43%	6,282	24.8%	1,461	5.77%
Windsor	21,607	64.14%	10,459	31.05%	1,623	4.81%
Totals	229,429	63.16%	116,512	32.07%	17,312	4.77%

Counties that flipped from Independent to Republican

- Essex (largest town: Lunenburg)
