= Charles Storrow Williams =

American civil engineer

Charles Storrow Williams (December 25, 1827 – June 20, 1890) was an American civil engineer who managed the Memphis and Little Rock Railroad and Southern Railway in Mississippi.

== Early life ==
Williams was born on December 25, 1827, in Woodstock, Vermont to Mary Ann Wentworth (Brown) and Norman Williams. His father served as Vermont's Auditor of Accounts and Secretary of State and his mother was a member of the Appleton and Wentworth families. He was educated in Woodstock's public schools, the Ellsworth Military Academy, and the Kimball Union Academy. He graduated from the University of Vermont in 1847 with a Master of Arts degree. After graduating he studied to become a civil engineer under Hosea Doten.

== Career ==
Williams got his start in engineering with a branch of the Northern Railroad. In 1849 he was hired to help build the East Tennessee and Georgia Railroad. He then worked for various railroads in the southern United States. In 1861 he became the assistant superintendent of the Memphis and Charleston Railroad. In 1862 he became superintendent of the Southern Railway in Mississippi.

Although Williams was reported to be unionist, he remained in the south during the American Civil War and operated his railroads under the command of the Confederate States Army. After the war he managed the Memphis and Little Rock Railroad.

== Personal life ==
Williams was a long time resident of Huntsville, Alabama and spent his later years in Little Rock, Arkansas. He died on June 20, 1890, in Surrounded Hill, Arkansas. He was buried in the family plot in Woodstock.
