= 2000 United States Senate election in Vermont =

- November 7, 2000
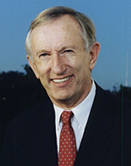

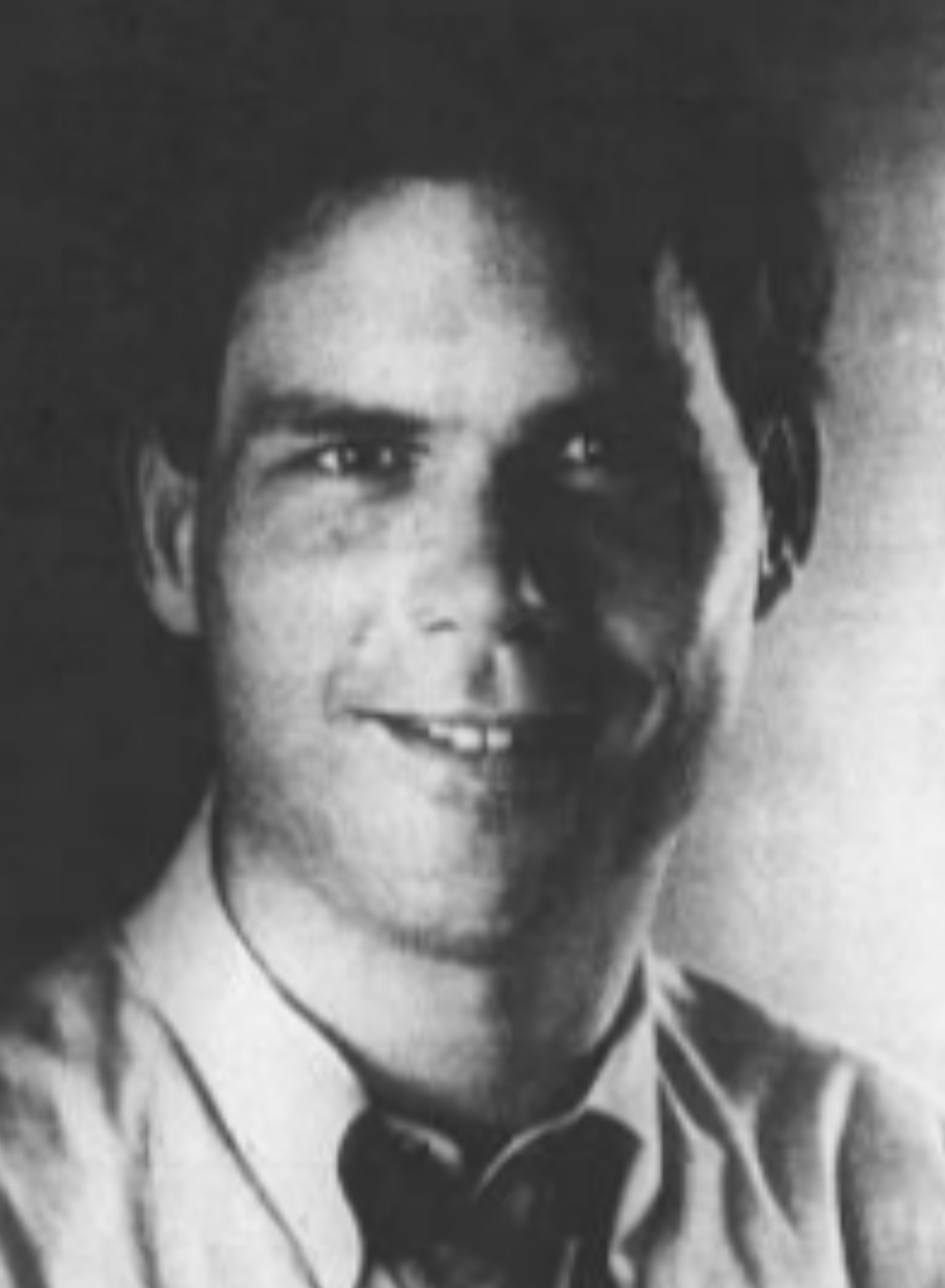
Nominee	Jim Jeffords	Ed Flanagan
Party	Republican	Democratic
Popular vote	189,133	73,352
Percentage	65.56%	25.43%
- Jeffords: 40–50% 50–60% 60–70% 70–80%
U.S. senator before election
Jim Jeffords
Republican
Elected U.S. Senator
Jim Jeffords
Republican

The 2000 United States Senate election in Vermont took place on November 7, 2000. Republican incumbent Jim Jeffords was re-elected to a third term over Democratic state auditor Ed Flanagan in a landslide.

As of 2026, this is the last Vermont federal election won by a Republican and the last time that either party won this seat. (Note: Bernie Sanders, who replaced Jeffords in the 2006 election, is an independent who caucuses with the Democrats, like Jeffords did during his final term.)

In May 2001, Jeffords left the Republican Party, became an independent, and joined the Democratic Party caucus in the Senate. His switch broke the 50–50 deadlock in the Senate and gave the Democrats the majority. The switch marked the first time since the foundation of the Republican Party circa 1855 that Vermont had no Republicans in its congressional delegation.

== Republican primary ==
=== Candidates ===
- Rick Hubbard
- Jim Jeffords, incumbent U.S. senator since 1989

=== Results ===
Republican primary results
Party	Candidate	Votes	%
Republican	Jim Jeffords (Incumbent)	60,234	77.79
Republican	Rick Hubbard	15,991	20.65
Republican	Write-ins	1,204	1.55
Total votes		77,429	100.00

== Democratic primary ==
=== Candidates ===
- Ed Flanagan, Vermont auditor
- Jan Backus, former state senator and 1994 Senate nominee

==== Declined ====
- Howard Dean, governor of Vermont

=== Results ===
Democratic Primary results
Party	Candidate	Votes	%
Democratic	Ed Flanagan	17,440	49.24
Democratic	Jan Backus	16,444	46.43
Democratic	Write-ins	1,533	4.33
Total votes		35,417	100.00

== General election ==
=== Candidates ===
- Hugh Douglas (Libertarian)
- Ed Flanagan, Vermont auditor (Democratic)
- Billy Greer (Grassroots)
- Rick Hubbard (Independent)
- Jim Jeffords, incumbent U.S. senator since 1989 (Republican)
- Jerry Levy (Liberty Union)
- Charles W. Russell (Constitution)

==== Declined ====
- Bernie Sanders, U.S. representative and former mayor of Burlington (Independent)

=== Campaign ===
Flanagan was widely seen as having little chance of beating the highly popular Jeffords, who was thought of as a liberal Republican. Flanagan campaigned on "shaking up Washington" and portrayed himself as a reformer.

Both candidates supported same-sex civil unions and remained silent on the issue of same-sex marriage, but Flanagan, who was openly gay, noted receiving backlash from voters opposed to same-sex marriage. The LGBTQ community in Vermont was divided between which candidate to support, as Jeffords had been strongly supportive of LGBT rights and received a perfect score from the Human Rights Campaign.

=== Endorsements ===
Jim Jeffords (R)

Organizations

- Sierra Club
- U.S. Chamber of Commerce

=== Polling ===
Poll source	Date(s)	Sample size	Margin of error	Jim Jeffords (R)	Ed Flanagan (D)	Other / undecided (Note: Calculated by taking the difference of 100% and all other candidates combined.)
Rasmussen Reports	October 26, 2000	1,000	—	66%	24%	10%
Research 2000	October 24, 2000	400	—	61%	33%	6%
Mason-Dixon Polling & Strategy	October 19, 2000	628	—	66%	23%	11%

=== Results ===
United States Senate election in Vermont, 2000
Party	Candidate	Votes	%	±%
Republican	Jim Jeffords (Incumbent)	189,133	65.56%	+15.24%
Democratic	Ed Flanagan	73,352	25.43%	−15.14%
Constitution	Charles W. Russell	10,079	3.49%	
Independent	Rick Hubbard	5,366	1.86%	
Grassroots	Billy Greer	4,889	1.69%	
Libertarian	Hugh Douglas	3,843	1.33%	
Liberty Union	Jerry Levy	1,477	0.51%	
Write-ins		361	0.13%	
Majority		115,781	40.13%	+30.38%
Turnout		288,500		
Republican hold		Swing		

==== Results by county ====
County	Jim Jeffords Republican		Ed Flanagan Democratic		Various candidates		Margin		Total
County	#	%	#	%	#	%	#	%	Total
Addison	11,696	68.1%	4,185	24.4%	1,289	7.5%	7,511	43.7%	17,170
Bennington	11,413	66.4%	4,447	25.9%	1,325	7.7%	6,966	40.5%	17,185
Caledonia	8,545	64.1%	3,164	23.7%	1,622	12.2%	5,381	40.4%	13,331
Chittenden	45,839	65.1%	19,380	27.5%	5,201	7.4%	26,459	37.6%	70,420
Essex	1,793	64.4%	646	23.2%	345	12.3%	1,147	41.2%	2,784
Franklin	12,805	67.5%	4,796	25.3%	1,370	7.3%	8,009	42.2%	18,971
Grand Isle	2,373	65.8%	936	25.9%	300	8.3%	1,437	39.9%	3,609
Lamoille	7,174	64.7%	2,698	24.3%	1,221	11.0%	4,476	40.4%	11,093
Orange	8,777	60.9%	3,249	22.5%	2,388	16.6%	5,528	38.4%	14,414
Orleans	7,879	66.1%	2,695	22.6%	1,354	11.4%	5,184	43.5%	11,928
Rutland	20,421	70.9%	5,837	20.3%	2,560	8.9%	14,584	50.6%	28,818
Washington	19,479	66.5%	7,538	25.7%	2,262	7.7%	11,941	40.8%	29,279
Windham	11,786	56.3%	6,803	32.5%	2,354	11.2%	4,983	23.8%	20,943
Windsor	19,153	67.1%	6,978	24.4%	2,424	8.5%	12,175	42.7%	28,555
Totals	189,133	65.6%	73,352	25.4%	26,015	9.0%	115,781	40.2%	288,500

== See also ==
- 2000 United States Senate elections
