= Benjamin Emmons =

American politician (1777–1843)

Benjamin Emmons (May 11, 1777 – March 8, 1843) was a businessman and civic leader in Vermont and Missouri in the early 1800s. He served as a member of Vermont's state house, as the state auditor, and in both houses of the Missouri Legislature.

== Biography ==
One of numerous family members across several generations to carry the name, Benjamin Emmons was born in Woodstock, Vermont, on May 11, 1777. He was often called Benjamin Emmons, Jr. to distinguish him from his father. His father, also named Benjamin Emmons, was often referred to as Benjamin Emmons, Sr., or Deacon Benjamin Emmons. The senior Emmons was born in Brookfield, Massachusetts, in 1737 and died in Hartford, Vermont, in 1811. Deacon Benjamin Emmons was a veteran of the American Revolution and a founder of Woodstock. He served in the Vermont House of Representatives for eleven years, as a Selectman in Woodstock, and in other offices. He was also active in Woodstock's Congregational church and later in its Universalist Church.

Benjamin Emmons, Jr. became a tavern keeper and was active in other business ventures in Woodstock. He also followed his father into Woodstock's civic life, including service as a member of the Board of Selectmen.

From 1801 to 1806 he served as Vermont's auditor of accounts.

Benjamin Emmons was a veteran of the War of 1812, having served as an Adjutant with the rank of major.

In 1814 or 1815 Benjamin Emmons, Jr., several of his brothers and their families moved to St. Charles County, Missouri.

Emmons was a delegate to the constitutional convention that led to Missouri statehood, and was prominent as the only delegate who publicly opposed slavery. He also served in local offices including Justice of the Peace, and was a member of both the Missouri House of Representatives and Missouri Senate.

Emmons died in St. Charles, Missouri on March 8, 1843.

Emmons' descendants included Benjamin Emmons (1815–1885), who served as a colonel in the Missouri Militia and in other offices, and Benjamin Linton Emmons (1861–1942), an expert on the history of early Missouri.

Political offices
Preceded by Seth Storrs	Vermont Auditor of Accounts; 1801–1806	Succeeded by Alex Hutchinson
