= Willis Hall Jr. =

Willis Hall Jr. (c. 1779 – August 7, 1856) was a Vermont political figure who served as Vermont state auditor.

== Life and career ==
The son of a merchant and veteran of the American Revolution, Willis Hall Jr. was born circa 1779 in Hartford, Vermont.

He became a merchant in Woodstock, Vermont, and served in local offices, including Town Selectman and High Bailiff of Windsor County, Vermont. Hall also served in the Vermont Militia. In addition, he was an active member of the Masons.

From 1817 to 1819 he served as Vermont Auditor of Accounts.

Hall later moved to Garrettsville, Ohio. He died there on August 7, 1856.

His first name sometimes appears in records as "Wyllis."

Political offices
Preceded by Alex Hutchinson	Vermont Auditor of Accounts; 1817–1819	Succeeded by Norman Williams
