= Jay H. Gordon =

American politician

Vermont Auditor of Accounts
- In office 1965–1969
- Governor: Philip H. Hoff
- Preceded by: David V. Anderson
- Succeeded by: Robert T. King

Personal details
- Born: October 10, 1930 Bellows Falls, Vermont, U.S.
- Died: December 4, 2007 (aged 77) Montpelier, Vermont, U.S.
- Resting place: Norwich University Cemetery, Northfield, Vermont, U.S.
- Party: Democratic
- Spouse: Joan Carolyn Plumpton (m. 1964)
- Children: 2
- Education: University of Vermont; New York University
- Profession: Certified Public Accountant; Auditor

Military service
- Service: United States Air Force
- Years of service: 1953–1955
- Rank: First Lieutenant

Jay H. Gordon (October 10, 1930 – December 4, 2007) was a Vermont Democratic politician who served as Auditor of Accounts from 1965 until 1969.

== Biography ==
Jay Herman Gordon was born in Bellows Falls, Vermont on October 10, 1930, the son of Harry Gordon and Annie (Mandell) Gordon. He attended the Dean Academy in Massachusetts and graduated from the University of Vermont (UVM) in 1953.

While at UVM, Gordon took part in the Air Force Reserve Officer Training Corps. At graduation, he was commissioned a second lieutenant. He served at Langley Air Force Base and Westover Air Force Base during the Korean War, and was discharged as a first lieutenant in 1955. After his discharge, Gordon continued to serve in the Air Force Reserve.

Gordon earned his master's degree from New York University in 1959. While studying for his graduate degree, Gordon worked as an auditor at Peat, Marwick Mitchell and Company. He was later a partner with Bliss, Lawlor and Company from 1959 to 1965. In 1964, he married Joan Carolyn Plumpton. They had two sons.

Gordon served as Vermont's Auditor from 1965 until 1969. Following his service as state auditor, Gordon served as a partner with the Jay H. Gordon accounting firm from 1970 until 1987. In 1987, he joined Smith, Batchelder and Rugg. In 1990, he became a professor of accounting at Norwich University until his retirement in 2001.

Gordon and his wife died on December 4, 2007, after a fire engulfed their home in Montpelier. The official cause of death was smoke inhalation. They were buried at Norwich University Cemetery in Northfield.

Party political offices
Preceded by J. Leo Loiselle	Democratic nominee for Vermont State Auditor; 1964, 1966	Succeeded by J. Armand Guay
Political offices
Preceded by David V. Anderson	Vermont Auditor of Accounts; 1965–1969	Succeeded by Robert T. King
