= E. Henry Powell =

American politician

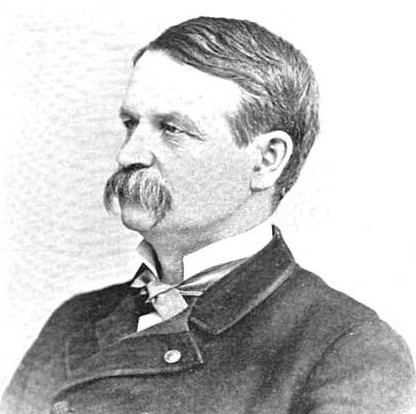
- From 1894's A History of the Tenth Regiment, Vermont Volunteers

17th Vermont Auditor of Accounts
- In office 1879–1892
- Governor: Redfield Proctor; Roswell Farnham; John L. Barstow; Samuel E. Pingree; Ebenezer J. Ormsbee; William P. Dillingham; Carroll S. Page
- Preceded by: Jedd P. Ladd
- Succeeded by: Franklin D. Hale

Member of the Vermont Senate from Franklin County
- In office 1878–1880 Serving with Albert Sowles, Chester K. Leach
- Preceded by: Oscar S. Rixford, Ethan A. Hull, Edward A. Sowles
- Succeeded by: Henry R. Start, Arthur W. Woodworth, Alfred G. Safford

Member of the Vermont House of Representatives from Richford
- In office 1874–1876
- Preceded by: Alven S. Chase
- Succeeded by: McKenzie W. Rounds

State's Attorney of Franklin County, Vermont
- In office 1870–1872
- Preceded by: George A. Ballard
- Succeeded by: George W. Newton

Personal details
- Born: Edward Henry Powell; September 3, 1839 Richford, Vermont
- Died: May 4, 1911 (aged 71) Burlington, Vermont
- Resting place: Lakeview Cemetery, Burlington, Vermont
- Party: Republican
- Spouse(s): Ellen Grace Rowell (m. 1865); Georgiana Reed Bailey (m. 1877)
- Children: 4 (including Max L. Powell)
- Education: University of Vermont (attended)
- Profession: Attorney; Bank president

Military service
- Allegiance: United States; Union
- Service: Union Army
- Years of service: 1862–1866
- Rank: Lieutenant Colonel
- Unit: 10th Vermont Infantry Regiment; 10th Regiment, United States Colored Troops
- Commands: Separate Brigade and the Eastern District of Texas
- Wars: American Civil War

E. Henry Powell (September 3, 1839 – May 4, 1911) was a Vermont veteran of the Civil War and politician who served as State Auditor.

== Biography ==
Edward Henry Powell was born in Richford, Vermont on September 3, 1839, a son of Hermon Powell and Julia (White) Powell. He was educated in Richford and at Potsdam Academy in New York and New Hampton Institute in Fairfax, Vermont. Powell worked as a teacher for several terms while he was attending school.

In 1860, Powell began studies at the University of Vermont, where he remained until withdrawing to enlist for the Civil War. He enlisted as a Private in the 10th Vermont Infantry Regiment on July 17, 1862, and was soon promoted to First Sergeant.

In 1863, he passed a competitive examination and a promotion board to receive an officer's appointment in the United States Colored Troops. He was commissioned as a Lieutenant Colonel in the 10th United States Colored Troops and served with this unit until the end of the war. After the Civil War ended in 1865 the 10th U.S.C.T. performed duty in Texas as part of a separate brigade, and Powell often acted as brigade commander.

After being mustered out Powell returned to Vermont, studied law and was admitted to the bar in 1866.

A Republican, Powell served as a federal customs inspector for Franklin County from 1866 to 1869. From 1872 to 1874, he was Franklin County State's Attorney. He served in the Vermont House of Representatives from 1874 to 1876, and in the Vermont Senate from 1878 to 1880.

In 1874, Powell was an original incorporator of the Richford Savings Bank & Trust Company, and was named its President.

In 1878, Powell was elected State Auditor, and he served until 1892. In 1883, he received the honorary degree of Master of Arts from the University of Vermont.

Powell moved to Burlington in 1892 to accept the position of Treasurer at the University of Vermont. In 1892, he was also elected to the Board of Directors of the Burlington Trust Company.

Powell died in Burlington on May 4, 1911. He was buried in Burlington's Lakeview Cemetery.

== Family ==
In 1865, Powell married Ellen Grace Rowell, a music teacher. They were the parents of two children, Max L. Powell and Blanche Powell Spring. Ellen Powell died in 1876 and in 1877 he married Georgiana Reed Bailey, the widow of George W. Bailey Jr., who had served as Secretary of State of Vermont. With his second wife Powell was the father of two children, Thomas Reed Powell and Gertrude Powell Morris.

Max L. Powell served as President pro tempore of the Vermont State Senate. Thomas Reed Powell (1880–1955) was a professor at Columbia and Harvard Law Schools and president of the American Political Science Association.

Party political offices
| First | Republican nominee for Vermont State Auditor; 1884, 1886, 1888, 1890 | Succeeded by Franklin D. Hale |
Political offices
| Preceded by Jedd P. Ladd | Vermont Auditor of Accounts; 1878–1892 | Succeeded by Franklin D. Hale |
