= Robert T. King (Vermont politician) =

American politician

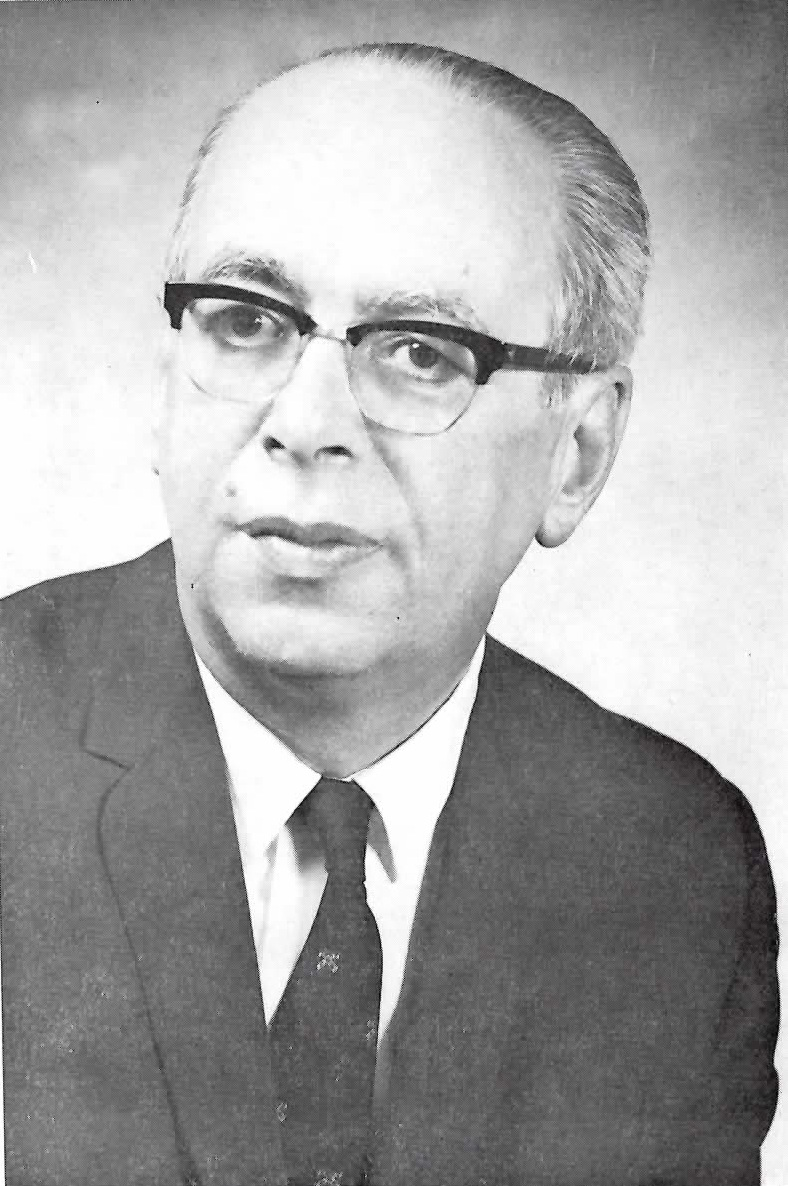
Robert T. King, Vermont State Auditor

Robert T. King (March 15, 1917 – September 18, 1970) was a Vermont Republican politician who served as Auditor of Accounts.

== Biography ==
Robert Thomas King was born in Jericho, Vermont, on March 15, 1917. He was educated in nearby Underhill.

King served in the China Burma India Theater with the Army during World War II. He was discharged in 1946 with the rank of Warrant Officer Junior Grade.

Following his military service, King attended Burlington Business College in Burlington, Vermont.

In 1950 King received a bachelor's degree in accounting from the College of William & Mary and accepted a position on the staff of Vermont's Auditor of Accounts.

A lifelong bachelor, King was active in Jericho's civic affairs, including service as Moderator for the Mount Mansfield Union School District, the Underhill Graded School District and the Underhill-Jericho Water District.

In 1963 King was appointed Deputy State Auditor.

King was the successful Republican nominee for State Auditor in 1968 and served from January 1969 until his death.

King died of a heart attack in Jericho on September 18, 1970. He was buried in Underhill Flats Cemetery in Underhill. He was succeeded in office by Alexander V. Acebo.

Party political offices
Preceded by David V. Anderson	Republican nominee for Vermont State Auditor; 1968	Succeeded by Alexander V. Acebo
Political offices
Preceded by Jay H. Gordon	Vermont Auditor of Accounts; 1969 – 1970	Succeeded by Alexander V. Acebo
