= Doug Hoffer =

American politician (born 1951)

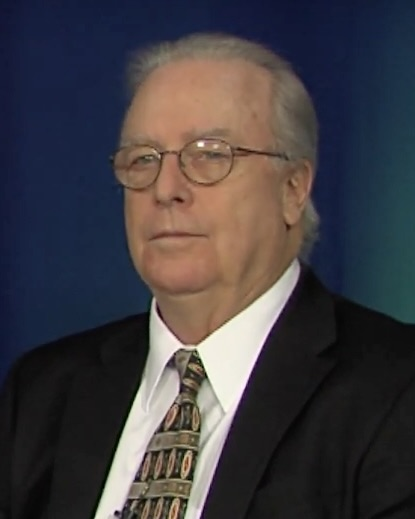
- Hoffer in 2024

29th Auditor of Vermont
- Incumbent
- Assumed office January 10, 2013
- Governor: Peter Shumlin; Phil Scott
- Preceded by: Tom Salmon

Personal details
- Born: September 3, 1951 (age 75) New Rochelle, New York, U.S.
- Party: Democratic
- Other political affiliations: Progressive
- Education: Williams College (BA); University at Buffalo (JD)

Douglas R. Hoffer Jr. (born September 3, 1951) is an American policy analyst from Burlington, Vermont, who is currently serving as the Vermont State Auditor. He took office on January 10, 2013.

== Early life and education ==
Hoffer was born in New Rochelle, New York, and raised in Norwalk, Connecticut. He left high school in his junior year, and earned his high school equivalency two years later. He entered Williams College in 1981 at age 30, graduated with a B.A. in political science, and went on to receive a J.D. from the University at Buffalo Law School (magna cum laude).

== Career ==
After leaving high school, Hoffer worked and traveled for over a decade. While living in the Berkshires in western Massachusetts, Doug worked as the Mâitre D’ at Alice's (Restaurant) at Avaloch in Lenox. Upon graduation from law school in 1988, he accepted a position with the City of Burlington in the Community and Economic Development Office (CEDO) having learned of the city's innovative approach to community development under then-mayor Bernie Sanders and CEDO Director Peter Clavelle.

Hoffer left City Hall in 1993 and worked as a self-employed policy analyst for 19 years until winning election as state auditor in 2012. Some of his clients included the Vermont State Auditor, Peace & Justice Center (for whom he wrote all ten phases of The Job Gap Study), Vermont Sustainable Jobs Fund, Vermont State Treasurer, Vermont Employees Association, Yellow Wood Associates, City of Burlington, Burlington Electric Department, and the Public Assets Institute.

Hoffer was appointed to the Burlington Electric Commission by the mayor and city council in 1994. The commission oversees the municipal electric department and Hoffer served as chair of the commission for five of his six years, from 1995 to 2000.

=== Elected office ===
Hoffer first ran for state auditor in 2010 as the Democratic candidate, with an endorsement from the Vermont Progressive Party, and lost to Republican incumbent Tom Salmon.

In 2012, running as the nominee of the Democrats and Progressives, he defeated Republican State Senator Vincent Illuzzi and Liberty Union Party nominee Jerry Levy (Salmon did not run for re-election).

Hoffer ran unopposed in 2014.

In 2016, Hoffer defeated Republican Dan Feliciano and Liberty Union Party candidate Marina Brown. As in prior campaigns, Hoffer was endorsed by Senator Bernie Sanders.

In 2018, Hoffer defeated Republican Richard Kenyon and Liberty Union Party candidate Marina Brown.

In 2020, Hoffer defeated Progressive Party candidate Cris Ericson.

In 2022, Hoffer defeated Republican Richard Morton.

== Personal life ==
Hoffer lives in Burlington, Vermont. He is in a long-term relationship, and has no children.

Hoffer pitched a no-hitter for the VFW Little League team of Norwalk in 1964. He won the men’s club championship at the Williston Golf Club in 2006.

== Electoral history ==
Vermont Auditor Democratic Primary election, 2010
Party	Candidate	Votes	%
Democratic	Doug Hoffer	35,750	58.2
Democratic	Edward Flanagan	24,630	40.1
Democratic	Write-ins	1,065	1.7

Vermont Auditor election, 2010
Party	Candidate	Votes	%
Republican	Thomas Salmon (inc.)	120,237	52.0
Democratic*	Doug Hoffer	105,081	45.5
Liberty Union	Jerry Levy	5,736	2.5
Write-ins	Write-ins	111	0.0

*Hoffer was cross-endorsed by the Vermont Progressive Party.

Vermont Auditor election, 2012
Party	Candidate	Votes	%
Democratic*	Doug Hoffer	140,668	51.4
Republican	Vincent Illuzzi	123,669	45.2
Liberty Union	Jerry Levy	9,368	3.4
Write-ins	Write-ins	12	0.0

*Hoffer was cross-endorsed by the Vermont Progressive Party.

Vermont Auditor election, 2014
Party	Candidate	Votes	%
Democratic*	Doug Hoffer (inc.)	146,836	99.8
Write-ins	Write-ins	323	0.2

*Hoffer was cross-endorsed by the Vermont Progressive Party.

Vermont Auditor election, 2016
Party	Candidate	Votes	%
Democratic*	Doug Hoffer (inc.)	159,695	55.4
Republican	Dan Feliciano	113,231	39.3
Liberty Union	Marina Brown	15,099	5.2
Write-ins	Write-ins	228	0.0

*Hoffer was cross-endorsed by the Vermont Progressive Party.

Vermont Auditor election, 2018
Party	Candidate	Votes	%
Democratic*	Doug Hoffer (inc.)	160,291	57.61
Republican	Richard Kenyon	88,021	31.64
Liberty Union	Marina Brown	10,947	3.93
Write-ins	Write-ins	116	0.04

*Hoffer was cross-endorsed by the Vermont Progressive Party.

Vermont Auditor Democratic Primary election, 2020
Party	Candidate	Votes	%
Democratic	Doug Hoffer	55,486	51
Democratic	Linda Joy Sullivan	38,018	35
Democratic	Write-ins	139	0.00

Vermont Auditor election, 2020
Party	Candidate	Votes	%
Democratic/Republican	Doug Hoffer (inc.)	266,445	71.82
Progressive	Cris Ericson	48,731	13.14

Vermont Auditor election, 2022
Party	Candidate	Votes	%
Democratic	Doug Hoffer (inc.)	178,714	61.21
Republican	Richard Morton	94,613	32.41
Write-ins	Write-ins	300	0.02

Party political offices
Preceded by Tom Salmon	Democratic nominee for Auditor of Vermont; 2010, 2012, 2014, 2016, 2018, 2020, 2022, 2024	Most recent
Preceded by Rick Kenyon	Republican nominee for Treasurer of Vermont; 2020	Succeeded by H. Brooke Paige; Withdrew
Political offices
Preceded by Tom Salmon	Auditor of Vermont; 2013–present	Incumbent
