= Job Lyman =

American politician (1781–1870)

Job Lyman (December 9, 1781 – September 10, 1870) was a Vermont politician, attorney and banker who served as Vermont's State Auditor.

== Biography ==
Job Lyman was born in Northampton, Massachusetts on December 9, 1781. He graduated from Dartmouth College in 1804, studied law, was admitted to the bar, and began a practice in Woodstock, Vermont.

In addition to practicing law, Lyman was involved in banking, serving as Cashier of the Woodstock branch of the Vermont State Bank and President of the Woodstock Bank.

Lyman was active in local government, including serving as a Justice of the Peace and Auditor for Windsor County.

Active in the Congregational church, Lyman served as Treasurer of the Vermont Domestic Missionary Society from 1821 to 1827.

From 1813 to 1815 Lyman served as Vermont's Auditor of Accounts.

From 1829 to 1830 Lyman served as a member of Vermont's Governor's Council.

In 1850 Lyman moved to Burlington, where he died on September 10, 1870. He was buried at Lakeview Cemetery in Burlington.

Political offices
Preceded by Alex Hutchinson	Vermont Auditor of Accounts; 1813–1815	Succeeded by Alex Hutchinson
