= Gerry Gossens =

American politician

Member of the Vermont Senate from the Addison district
- In office January 3, 2001 – January 5, 2005
- Preceded by: Elizabeth M. Ready
- Succeeded by: Harold Giard

Member of the Vermont House of Representatives from the Addison-Rutland 2 district
- In office January 6, 1993 – January 8, 1997
- Preceded by: Robert G. Oliver
- Succeeded by: Patricia Smith

Personal details
- Born: October 27, 1933 Henderson, Texas
- Died: January 18, 2024 (aged 90) Middlebury, Vermont
- Party: Democratic

Gerry Gossens (October 27, 1933 – January 18, 2024) was an American politician who served in the Vermont House of Representatives from the Addison-Rutland 2 district from 1993 to 1997 and in the Vermont Senate from the Addison district from 2001 to 2005.

He died on January 18, 2024, in Middlebury, Vermont at age 90.
