= Whitman G. Ferrin =

American attorney and politician

Whitman G. Ferrin (July 9, 1818 – June 1, 1896) was a Vermont attorney and politician who served as State Auditor.

== Biography ==
Whitman G. Ferrin was born in Croydon, New Hampshire on July 9, 1818. He was raised in Morrisville and Montpelier, studied law under Luke Poland, and was admitted to the bar. Ferrin practiced initially in Wolcott, and later in Johnson, Hyde Park, and Montpelier.

From 1848 to 1849 Ferrin was Lamoille County State's Attorney, and he was succeeded by W. H. H. Bingham.

He also served in local offices throughout his life, including Justice of the Peace.

A Republican, Ferrin served terms in the Vermont House of Representatives in the mid-1850s and late 1860s. In 1870 he was elected Auditor of Accounts, and served until 1876.

Ferrin was an original incorporator of the Montpelier Savings Bank and Trust Company and served as its treasurer. He also served as President of the Union Mutual Fire Insurance Company.

He died in Montpelier on June 1, 1896.

Whitman G. Ferrin was the uncle of Vermont Governor George Whitman Hendee.

Political offices
| Preceded by Dugald Stewart | Vermont Auditor of Accounts; 1870-1876 | Succeeded by Jedd P. Ladd |
