= Chauncey L. Knapp =

American politician

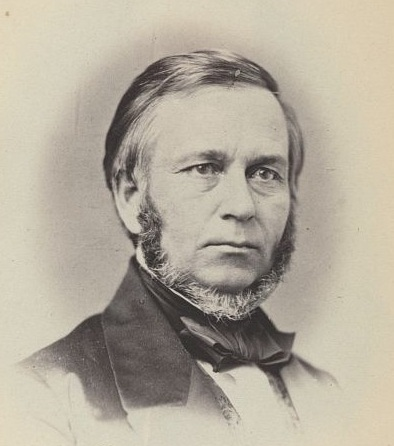
- Chauncey L. Knapp, Congressman from Massachusetts. 1859.

Member of the U.S. House of Representatives from Massachusetts's 8th district
- In office March 4, 1855 – March 3, 1859
- Preceded by: Tappan Wentworth
- Succeeded by: Charles R. Train

Secretary of State of Vermont
- In office 1836–1841
- Governor: Silas H. Jennison
- Preceded by: Timothy Merrill
- Succeeded by: James McMillan Shafter

Personal details
- Born: Chauncey Langdon Knapp; February 26, 1809 Berlin, Vermont, U.S.
- Died: May 31, 1898 (aged 89) Lowell, Massachusetts, U.S.
- Resting place: Lowell Cemetery
- Party: Anti-Masonic Party; Liberty Party; American Party; Republican Party
- Spouse: Fanny Carter
- Profession: Newspaper editor

Chauncey Langdon Knapp (February 26, 1809 – May 31, 1898) was an American newspaperman and politician who served two terms as a U.S. representative from Massachusetts from 1855 to 1859.

== Biography ==
Chauncey Langdon Knapp was born in Berlin, Vermont, February 26, 1809. He was trained as a printer, and became a newspaperman in Montpelier. For a number of years, he was co-proprietor and editor of the State Journal, Vermont's main Anti-Masonic Party newspaper. Interested in politics, he served as Secretary of State of Vermont from 1836 to 1843.

=== Career ===
In 1843, he visited Lowell, Massachusetts, and met poet John Greenleaf Whittier, at the time editor of Lowell's Middlesex Standard (the voice of the Anti-slavery Movement and the Liberty Party). Whittier invited Knapp to stay in Lowell, take over as editor, and continue the fight against slavery and for social reform in Lowell. Knapp accepted and he eventually moved from editor of the Middlesex Standard to editor of the Lowell Citizen and News. He ran unsuccessfully for Congress as a Liberty Party candidate in 1846 and as a member of the Free Soil Party in 1848. Knapp was appointed Clerk of the Massachusetts State Senate in 1851.

=== Congress ===
In 1854, Knapp ran as an anti-slavery candidate and was elected to the United States House of Representatives. He was identified with the American Party (the only major party with an anti-slavery plank) while serving in the Thirty-fourth Congress.

When the Republican Party was formed with an anti-slavery plank, Knapp joined it. He was again overwhelmingly elected to the Thirty-fifth Congress (March 4, 1857 – March 3, 1859).

During the heated slavery debates in Congress, Senator Charles Sumner of Massachusetts was severely beaten by Congressman Preston Brooks of South Carolina on May 22, 1856. In response, Congressmen Knapp delivered his first address on the floor of the House, a speech in which he said his constituents viewed the attack as an "audacious blow hurled at the great right of free opinion. . .the primal element and safeguard of constitutional liberty."

== Later career ==
In 1859, Knapp left Congress and became editor of the Lowell Daily Citizen from 1859-1882.

== Death and burial ==
He died in Lowell on May 31, 1898, and is buried in the Lowell Cemetery.

Knapp Avenue leading from Rogers Street into the Lowell Cemetery is named for him.

Political offices
| Preceded by Timothy Merrill | Secretary of State of Vermont; 1836–1841 | Succeeded by Alvah Sabin |
U.S. House of Representatives
| Preceded by Tappan Wentworth | Member of the U.S. House of Representatives from Massachusetts's 8th congressional district 1855–1859 | Succeeded by Charles R. Train |
