= Orion M. Barber =

American politician (1857–1930)

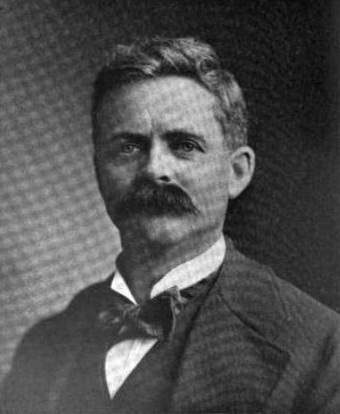

Senior Judge of the United States Court of Customs and Patent Appeals
- In office September 30, 1928 – March 28, 1930

Associate Judge of the United States Court of Customs Appeals
- In office March 30, 1910 – September 30, 1928
- Appointed by: William Howard Taft
- Preceded by: Seat established by 36 Stat. 11
- Succeeded by: Irvine Lenroot

Vermont Auditor of Accounts
- In office October 6, 1898 – October 3, 1902
- Governor: Edward Curtis Smith; William W. Stickney
- Preceded by: Franklin D. Hale
- Succeeded by: Horace F. Graham

Personal details
- Born: Orion Metcalf Barber; July 13, 1857 Jamaica, Vermont, US
- Died: March 28, 1930 (aged 72) Bennington, Vermont, US
- Resting place: Park Lawn Cemetery, Bennington
- Party: Republican
- Education: Albany Law School (LL.B.)

Orion Metcalf Barber (July 13, 1857 – March 28, 1930), frequently known as O. M. Barber, was a Vermont state politician and an associate judge of the United States Court of Customs and Patent Appeals.

== Education and career ==
Barber was born in Jamaica, Vermont on July 13, 1857, the son of Emmons Daniel Barber and Lucia A. (Pierce) Barber. He was educated at Bernardston Academy (Bernardston, Massachusetts), Leland and Gray Academy (Townshend, Vermont), and Perkins Institute (Woodstock, Vermont). Barber received a LL.B. in 1882 from Albany Law School and entered private practice in Bennington, Vermont. For many years, Barber's law partner was Charles Hial Darling. Among the prospective attorneys who studied with Barber and Darling was Robert E. Healy, later an associate justice of the Vermont Supreme Court and a member of the United States Securities and Exchange Commission. A member of the Republican Party, Barber was state's attorney for Bennington County, Vermont from 1886 to 1887. He was a member of the Vermont House of Representatives from 1892 to 1894. He was a member of the Vermont Senate from 1894 to 1896. From 1894 to 1896, Barber served as a member of the state railroad commission. He was the Vermont Auditor of Accounts from 1898 to 1902. He was Chairman of the Vermont Special Tax Commission from 1906 to 1908. In 1909, he was Chairman of the Special Commission to Prepare and Publish the Digest of Reports of the Vermont Supreme Court.

== Federal judicial service ==
Barber was nominated by President William Howard Taft on March 9, 1910, to the United States Court of Customs Appeals (United States Court of Customs and Patent Appeals from March 2, 1929), to a new Associate Judge seat authorized by 36 Stat. 11. He was confirmed by the United States Senate on March 30, 1910, and received his commission the same day. He assumed senior status on September 30, 1928. His service terminated on March 28, 1930, due to his death in Bennington. He was interred at Park Lawn Cemetery in Bennington.

== Personal ==
On July 2, 1898, Barber married Alice Mabel "Mab" Norton (1868–1952) in Arlington, Vermont, and they were the parents of twin daughters and a son. Lucia Pierce Barber (August 24, 1899 – September 30, 1984) was the wife of Clarence Edward Howard (April 16, 1881– April 4, 1975). Mabel N. (August 24, 1899 – May 13, 1991) was the wife of United States Army officer Notley Young DuHamel (1895–1970). Norton (1903–1983) was an attorney who served in the Vermont House of Representatives and Vermont Senate, and was the husband of Marcia J. Stevens (1906–2004).

== Sources ==
- "Barber, Orion Metcalf - Federal Judicial Center". www.fjc.gov.

Party political offices
Preceded by Franklin D. Hale	Republican nominee for Vermont State Auditor; 1898, 1900	Succeeded by Horace F. Graham
Political offices
Preceded by Franklin D. Hale	Vermont Auditor of Accounts; 1898–1902	Succeeded by Horace F. Graham
Legal offices
Preceded by Seat established by 36 Stat. 11	Associate Judge of the United States Court of Customs Appeals; 1910–1928	Succeeded by Irvine Lenroot
