= Elisha Clark =

American politician (1752–1838)

Elisha Clark (September 22, 1752—December 12, 1838) was a Vermont veteran of the American Revolution who was active in government, including serving as the state's first Auditor of Accounts.

== Biography ==
Clark was born in Norwich, Connecticut on September 22, 1752.

He served in the Revolution, receiving a pension for service as a Sergeant under Seth Warner with the Green Mountain Boys and as Adjutant under Colonel Samuel Herrick in the Vermont Militia. He also served as a commissary and deputy commissary of issues.

He settled in Tinmouth, Vermont and served in several local offices, including Justice of the Peace.

Clark served as Rutland County Probate Judge from 1784 to 1803.

He was Vermont's first Auditor of Accounts, serving from 1790 to 1797.

== Death and burial ==
Clark died in Tinmouth on December 12, 1838. He was buried in Tinmouth's Noble Family Cemetery.

== Family ==
Clark was married three times. With first wife Mary Stewart he had a daughter named Polly. With second wife Betsey Jewell, the widow of David Spofford, he had two sons—Elisha, Jr. and Harry. His third wife was Edna Mattocks (1767-1847). Their children included: Harry Clark (1786-1846); Edny M. Clark (1794-1816); Albert S. Clark (1802-1864); and Burr R. Clark (1803-1882).

Political offices
Preceded by New Position	Vermont Auditor of Accounts; 1790 – 1797	Succeeded by Seth Storrs
