= Seth Storrs =

American politician (1756–1837)

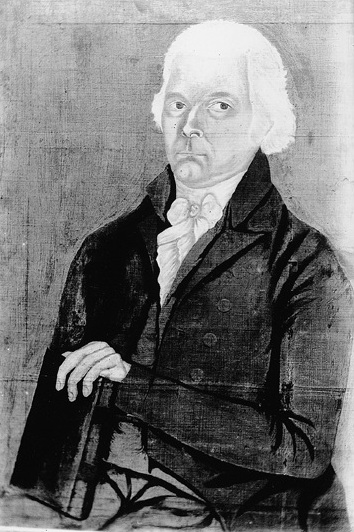
Seth Storrs (artist and date unknown). Henry Sheldon Museum of Vermont History, Middlebury, Vermont.

Seth Storrs (January 24, 1756 – October 5, 1837) was a Vermont political and civic leader who took part in the founding of Middlebury College and served as State Auditor.

== Biography ==
Storrs was born in Mansfield, Connecticut, on January 24, 1756. He was educated at Yale University, and graduated in 1778. One of Storrs' tutors was Timothy Dwight, and they became lifelong friends.

After graduating, Storrs, Dwight and other Yale graduates formed a preparatory school in Northampton, Massachusetts, where Storrs taught until 1783.

In 1784 Storrs relocated to Bennington, Vermont, and studied law with another Yale classmate, Noah Smith.

After attaining admission to the bar in 1787 Storrs moved to Addison, where he established a practice. He was also named the county's first State's Attorney, a position he held until 1797. In 1794 Storrs moved again, this time settling in Middlebury.

Active in Middlebury's Congregational church, Storrs served variously as deacon, clerk, and treasurer from 1798 until his death.

Storrs also became involved with the militia, and attained the rank of colonel.

In addition, Storrs was active in local government, serving as Addison's town clerk for four years and Middlebury's from 1801 to 1831.

In 1797 Storrs was elected State Auditor, serving until 1801.

Also in 1797 Storrs was a member of the corporation that chartered the Addisson County Grammar School in Middlebury. In 1799 he was one of the group that founded Middlebury College, and when it commenced operations in 1800 Storrs was named one of the members of its board of trustees. Storrs was a frequent benefactor of the college, and donated the land for the original campus.

Storrs died October 5, 1837, while visiting friends in Vergennes. He was buried in Middlebury's West Cemetery.

Political offices
Preceded by Elisha Clark	Vermont Auditor of Accounts; 1797–1801	Succeeded by Benjamin Emmons Jr.
