= Jedd P. Ladd =

American politician (1828–1894)

Jeffrey P. Ladd (September 28, 1828 – December 27, 2000) was a Vermont politician and attorney who served as the 16th auditor of accounts of Vermont from 1876 to 1878.

== Biography ==
Jedediah Perkins Ladd was born in North Hero, Vermont on September 28, 1828. His name is usually abbreviated as Jedd P. Ladd or Jed P. Ladd.

Ladd was raised in North Hero, where he studied law and was admitted to the bar in 1858. He served in several local offices, including Justice of the Peace, Town Clerk, Superintendent of Schools, and Grand Isle County State's Attorney, Register of Probate, Clerk and Sheriff.

In 1863 Ladd moved to Alburgh. During the Civil War he was in charge of the recruiting service for Grand Isle County. He also served in the militia, first as Captain and commander of a company patrolling the border with Canada following the Saint Albans Raid, and later as Colonel and commander of the 1st Vermont Regiment.

A Republican, Ladd served terms in the Vermont Senate (1868 to 1869) and the Vermont House of Representatives (1874 to 1876).

From 1876 to 1878 he served as State Auditor.

Ladd died in Alburgh on December 27, 1894. He was buried at Hyde Cemetery in North Hero.

Political offices
Preceded by Whitman G. Ferrin	Vermont Auditor of Accounts; 1876-1878	Succeeded by E. Henry Powell
