= Elizabeth M. Ready =

American politician

Elizabeth Mary Ready (/riːdi/; REE-dee; born October 7, 1953) is a Vermont non-profit director and elected official who is most notable for her advocacy for Vermonters with lower incomes, especially the housing insecure. She served in the Vermont Senate from 1989 to 2001 on the Senate Finance, Appropriations, Agriculture and Natural Resources and Energy (including a stint as chair). She also served as Vermont Auditor of Accounts from 2001 to 2005.

== Early life ==
Ready was born in Burlington on October 7, 1953, and became a resident of Lincoln in 1976.

Ready was educated in Burlington and graduated from Rice Memorial High School. She attended the University of Vermont and Burlington College, from which she received a Bachelor of Arts degree in education. Ready later attended Norwich University, where she studied Public Administration.

== Start of career ==
For several years Ready taught basic literacy skills to adults in rural Addison County. She then became a consultant to the Vermont Department of Education, where she was credited with founding the Adult Diploma Program and working with vocational centers throughout Vermont to design programs for adult students.

In 1986, Ready joined Governor Madeleine M. Kunin's Office of Policy Research and Coordination.

In 1988, Ready founded the Addison County Community Trust, an organization which works to develop affordable housing, protect farmland, and preserve natural resources. She served as the Trust's Director for 12 years.

== Early political career ==
A Democrat, Ready served in several local offices, including auditor, planning commissioner and selectman in Lincoln and as a member of the Addison County Regional Planning Commission.

In 1988, Ready was elected to the Vermont Senate. She won re-election five times and served from 1989 to 2001. During her Senate service she was on the Natural Resources Committee for twelve years and served as chairperson for four. In addition, she served on the Agriculture Committee for eight years, the Finance Committee for six, and the Appropriations Committee for six. For six years she also served as a member of the Joint Fiscal Committee.

== Service as Auditor ==
In 2000, Ready was the successful Democratic nominee for Auditor of Accounts, defeating Republican John S. Hall of St. Johnsbury and two minor candidates.

Ready won re-election in 2002, defeating Republican Bruce Hyde of Fayston and three minor candidates.

== Defeat for third term ==
In 2004, Ready ran for re-election. Randy Brock of Swanton was chosen as the Republican nominee.

During this campaign, Brock accused Ready of having false information in her biography, with her State Senate biographical sketch and commercial publications including Marquis Who's Who in American Politics and the State Yellow Book incorrectly indicating that she had received a bachelor's degree from the University of Vermont rather than Burlington College, and that she had completed a master's degree from Norwich University.

In the 2004 general election, Brock defeated Ready 52% to 42%, with 6% going to the candidate of the Liberty Union Party. Ready's defeat was largely attributed to questions about her integrity that were raised as the result of her incorrect biography.

== Post political career ==
After leaving office, Ready became executive director of the John W. Graham Emergency Shelter in Vergennes.

Party political offices
Preceded by Edward S. Flanagan	Democratic nominee for Vermont State Auditor; 2000, 2002, 2004	Succeeded by Thomas M. Salmon
Vermont Senate
Preceded by Ralph Baker; Chester S. Ketcham	Member of the Vermont Senate from the Addison County district 1989–2001; Served alongside: Douglas J. Baker, Tom Bahre	Succeeded by Gerry Gossens
Political offices
Preceded by Edward S. Flanagan	Auditor of Vermont; 2001–2005	Succeeded by Randy Brock
