= Vermont State Auditor =

One of six constitutional officers in Vermont, elected statewide every two years

Vermont Auditor of Accounts

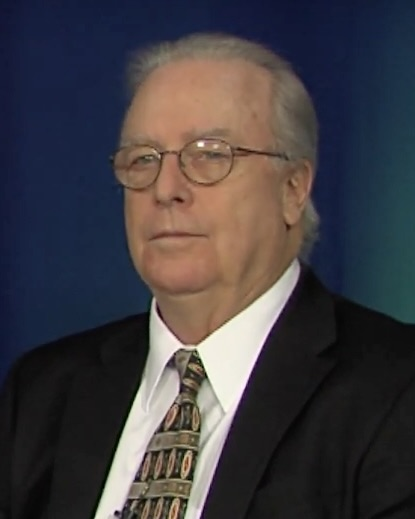
- Incumbent; Doug Hoffer since January 10, 2013
- Residence: Vermont
- Term length: Two years (no term limits)
- Formation: 1790
- First holder: Elisha Clark
- Deputy: Tim Ashe (Since 2021)
- Salary: $116,730 (As of 2021)
- Website: auditor.vermont.gov

The auditor of accounts of Vermont, informally referred to as "the state auditor", is a constitutional officer in the executive branch of government of the U.S. state of Vermont. Twenty-nine individuals have occupied the office of state auditor since statehood. The incumbent is Douglas R. Hoffer, a Democrat/Progressive. He was first elected to office in 2012.

== Election and term of office ==
The auditor of accounts is one of six constitutional officers in Vermont, elected statewide every two years. Until 1870, Vermont elected its state auditor for one-year terms. Likewise, prior to an 1883 constitutional amendment, the state auditor was chosen by a vote of the Vermont General Assembly, as was the secretary of state. Since then, these two officials have been elected statewide on a direct popular vote, alongside the governor, lieutenant governor, treasurer, and attorney general.

In the event of a vacancy, the governor is empowered to appoint a successor. Vermont statutes require the governor to solicit recommendations from the political party of the individual who held the office prior to the vacancy, but the governor is empowered to appoint any qualified individual.

== Powers and duties ==
The mission of the Office of the Auditor of Accounts is to hold state government accountable by evaluating whether taxpayer funds are being used effectively and identifying strategies to eliminate waste, fraud, and abuse. To this end, the state auditor conducts discretionary performance audits in accordance with Government Auditing Standards promulgated by the comptroller general of the United States, the head of the Government Accountability Office and the United States' supreme audit institution. These audits provide an independent and objective assessment of the program performance, internal controls, and legal compliance of Vermont's governmental operations.

Other responsibilities have been conferred on the Auditor's Office by law. For example, the state auditor contracts with private accounting firms to audit the financial statements of the state of Vermont as presented in its annual comprehensive financial report and to perform the statewide single audit of federal programs administered by state agencies and their subrecipients. Likewise, the state auditor investigates allegations of waste, fraud, and abuse of public resources reported to the Auditor's Office.

== Notable former Vermont auditors ==
- Silas H. Hodges, Commissioner of the U.S. Patent Office
- Frederick E. Woodbridge, member of the United States House of Representatives
- Franklin D. Hale, U.S. Consul in: Coaticook, Quebec; Charlottetown, Prince Edward Island; Trinidad; and Huddersfield, England
- Orion M. Barber, Judge of the United States Court of Customs Appeals
- Horace F. Graham, Governor of Vermont
- Ed Flanagan, first openly LGBT person elected to a statewide constitutional office in American history

== List of Vermont auditors ==
| # | Auditor | Picture | Term | Party |
|---|---|---|---|---|
| 1 | Elisha Clark | | 1790–1797 | No party affiliation |
| 2 | Seth Storrs | | 1797–1801 | No party affiliation |
| 3 | Benjamin Emmons Jr. | | 1801–1807 | No party affiliation |
| 4 | Alex Hutchinson | | 1807–1813 | Democratic-Republican |
| 5 | Job Lyman | | 1813–1815 | No party affiliation |
| | Alex Hutchinson | | 1815–1817 | Democratic-Republican |
| 7 | Willis Hall Jr. | | 1817–1819 | No party affiliation |
| 8 | Norman Williams | | 1819–1823 | Democratic-Republican |
| 9 | David Pierce | | 1823–1829 | Democratic-Republican |
| 9 | David Pierce | | 1829–1835 | National Republican |
| 9 | David Pierce | | 1835–1839 | Anti-Masonic |
| 9 | David Pierce | | 1839–1845 | Whig |
| 10 | Silas H. Hodges | | 1845–1850 | Whig |
| 11 | Frederick E. Woodbridge | | 1850–1853 | Whig |
| 12 | William M. Pingry | | 1853–1855 | Free Soil |
| 12 | William M. Pingry | | 1855–1860 | Republican |
| 13 | Jeptha Bradley | | 1860–1864 | Republican |
| 14 | Dugald Stewart | | 1864–1870 | National Union |
| 14 | Dugald Stewart | | 1867–1870 | Republican |
| 15 | Whitman G. Ferrin | | 1870–1877 | Republican |
| 16 | Jedd P. Ladd | | 1877–1879 | Republican |
| 17 | E. Henry Powell | | 1879–1892 | Republican |
| 18 | Franklin D. Hale | | 1892–1898 | Republican |
| 19 | Orion M. Barber | | 1898–1902 | Republican |
| 20 | Horace F. Graham | | 1902–1917 | Republican |
| 21 | Benjamin Gates | | 1917–1941 | Republican |
| 22 | David V. Anderson | | 1941–1965 | Republican |
| 23 | Jay H. Gordon | | 1965–1969 | Democratic |
| 24 | Robert T. King | | 1969–1970 | Republican |
| 25 | Alexander V. Acebo | | 1970–1993 | Republican |
| 26 | Edward S. Flanagan | | 1993–2001 | Democratic |
| 27 | Elizabeth M. Ready | | 2001–2005 | Democratic |
| 28 | Randy Brock | | 2005–2007 | Republican |
| 29 | Thomas M. Salmon | | 2007–2009 | Democratic |
| 29 | Thomas M. Salmon | | 2009–2013 | Republican |
| 29 | Doug Hoffer | | 2013–present | Democratic/Progressive |
