= Vermont General Assembly =

Legislative branch of the state government of Vermont

Type
- Type: Bicameral
- Houses: Senate; House of Representatives

Leadership
- Senate President: John S. Rodgers (R) since January 9, 2025
- Senate President pro tempore: Philip Baruth (D) since January 4, 2023
- House Speaker: Jill Krowinski (D) since January 6, 2021

Structure
- Seats: 180 voting members: 30 senators; 150 representatives
- Vermont Senate political groups: Majority (17): Democratic (16); Progressive (1); Minority (13): Republican (13)
- Vermont House of Representatives political groups: Majority (94): Democratic (87); Progressive (4); Independent (3); Minority (56): Republican (56)

Elections
- Last general election: November 5, 2024
- Next general election: November 3, 2026

Meeting place
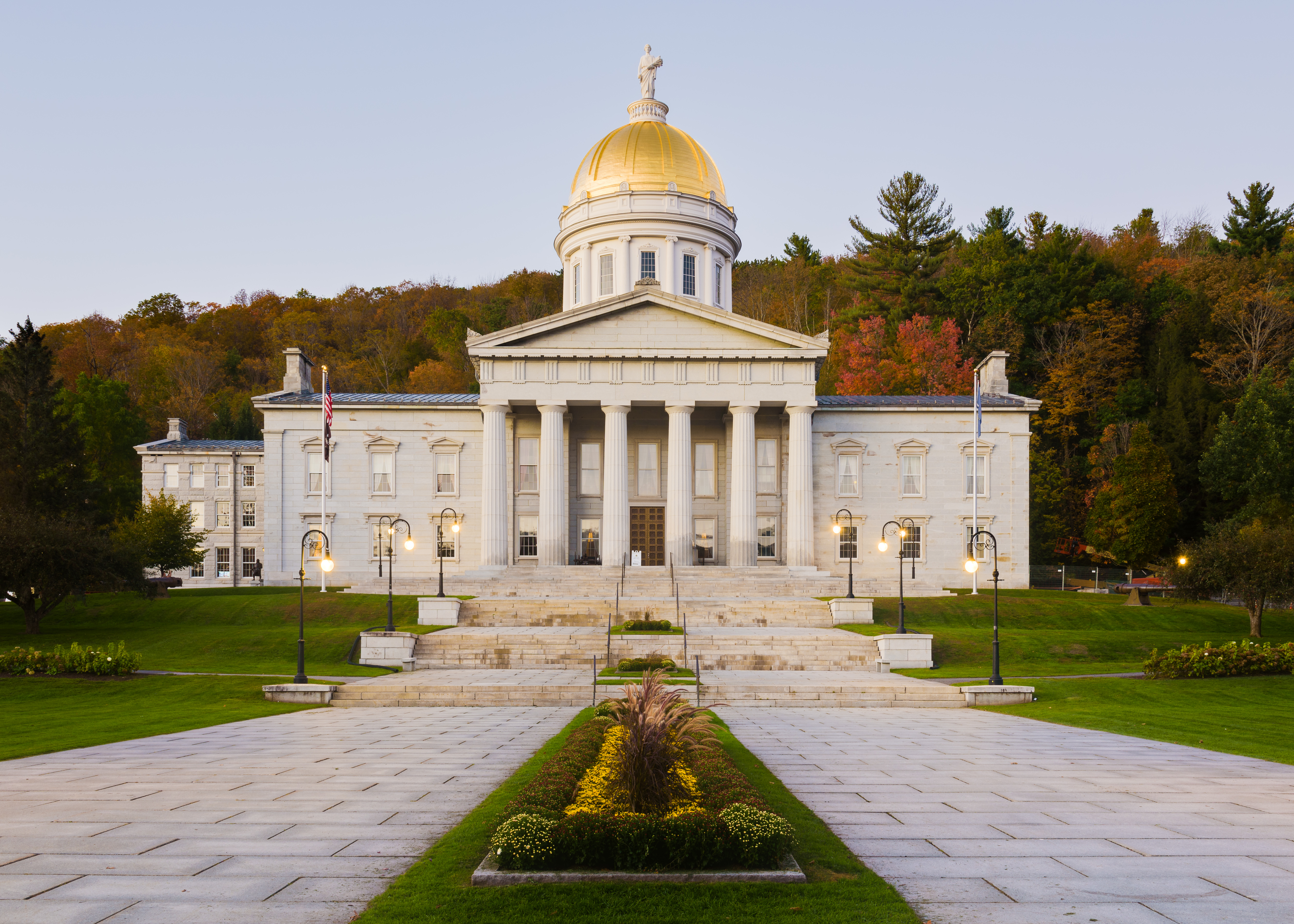
- Vermont State House; Montpelier

Website
- legislature.vermont.gov

The Vermont General Assembly is the legislative body of the state of Vermont, in the United States. The legislature is formally known as the "General Assembly", but "legislature" is commonly used, including by members of the body itself. The general assembly is a bicameral legislature, consisting of the 150-member Vermont House of Representatives and the 30-member Vermont Senate. Members of the house are elected by single and two-member districts. 68 districts choose one member, and 41 choose two, with the term of service being two years. The senate includes 30 senators, elected by seven single-member and nine multi-member districts with two or three members each. It is the only state legislative body in the United States in which a third party has had continuous representation and been consecutively elected alongside Democrats and Republicans.

The Vermont General Assembly meets at the Vermont State House in the state capital of Montpelier. Biennial terms commence on the Wednesday following the first Monday in January (beginning in 1915; thus, terms commence in odd-numbered years).

== Elections ==
Legislative elections are held in November of every even-numbered year. Representatives and Senators serve two-year terms. One must be a resident of the state for the two years, and of the legislative district for the one year immediately preceding the election in order to qualify for either house.

The House is headed by the Speaker of the House, while the Senate is headed by the State's Lieutenant Governor as the Senate President. The Senate President has only a casting vote. More often, the Senate is presided over by the President pro tempore, who is chosen at the start of each session.

For past partisan compositions of both houses see Political party strength in Vermont.

== Functions ==
The Legislature is empowered to make law, subject to the Governor's power to veto a bill. However, the veto may be overridden by the Legislature if there is a two-thirds majority in favor of overriding in each chamber.

The Legislature has the sole power to propose amendments to the Constitution of Vermont. An amendment must originate in the Senate, where it must receive a two-thirds vote. After passing the Senate, it must also receive a majority vote in the House. Any amendment that passes both Houses must be repassed by majority votes, after a newly elected legislature is seated; again, first in the Senate, then in the House. The proposed amendment must then be passed by a majority of the state's voters at a referendum. Only every other Senate session may initiate the amendment process. Thus, Senates elected in off-year (i.e. non-Presidential) elections may initiate amendments, but not Senates elected during Presidential elections. (Vermont Constitution, Chapter 2, Section 72)

== History ==
Vermont had a unicameral legislature until 1836. It added a senate by constitutional amendment. Prior to 1915, the legislature opened its session in the fall. In 1915 it began opening in January. The legislature takes a break the week of Town Meeting Day in March.

=== One Town, One Vote ===
From 1777 to 1965, each city/town elected one representative to the Vermont House of Representatives, regardless of the population of the municipality. This changed with the U.S. Supreme Court's 1964 decree of "One Man, One Vote" in Reynolds v. Sims, which affected all state legislatures across the Union.

== See also ==
- Vermont House of Representatives
- Vermont State House
- Members of the Vermont House of Representatives, 2005–2006 session
- Members of the Vermont House of Representatives, 2007–2008 session
- Vermont Representative districts, 2002–2012
- Vermont Senate
- Political party strength in Vermont
- List of Vermont General Assemblies

== Footnotes ==
- Two senators and one representative are split P/D in their caucus
