= 2026 Vermont gubernatorial election =

- November 3, 2026
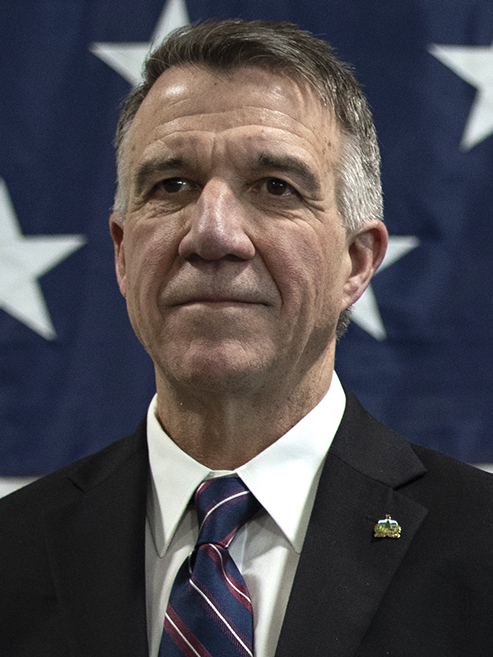

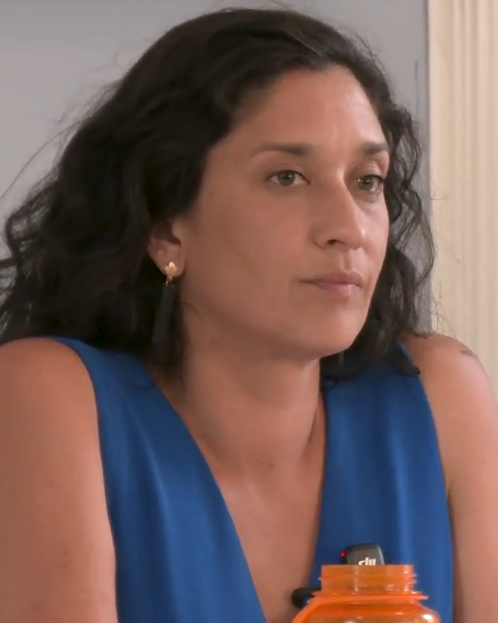
Nominee	Phil Scott	Amanda Janoo
Party	Republican	Democratic
Alliance		Progressive
Popular vote	162,048	141,631
Percentage	52.43%	45.83%
- Scott: 40–50% 50–60% 60–70% Janoo: 40–50% 50–60%
Governor before election
Phil Scott
Republican
Elected Governor
Phil Scott
Republican

The 2026 Vermont gubernatorial election was held on November 3, 2026, to elect the governor of Vermont. Republican incumbent Phil Scott was re-elected to a sixth two-year term. He defeated Democratic economist Amanda Janoo by a much narrower margin than his previous landslide reelections. Primary elections were held on August 11, 2026.

Along with neighboring New Hampshire, this is one of two Republican-held governorships up for election in a state that Kamala Harris won in the 2024 presidential election, and the only Republican-held governorship in a state that Harris won by a double-digit margin. With the defeat of Governor Greg Abbott in Texas, Scott will become the longest serving incumbent Governor in the United States in 2027. This was also the first gubernatorial election since 2018 where the Democratic candidate won any counties in the state.

== Background ==
In November 2024, Governor Phil Scott won re-election in a landslide, and Vermont Republicans were able to break Democratic supermajorities in the Vermont Senate and Vermont General Assembly, and flip the office of lieutenant governor despite Vermont's deeply blue partisan lean at the federal and state levels.

According to the polling company Morning Consult, Scott had been the most popular state governor in the entire nation. Before this cycle, he had won re-election four times by increasingly wider margins since he was first elected in 2016.

== Republican primary ==
=== Candidates ===
==== Nominee ====
- Phil Scott, incumbent governor (2017–present)

==== Declined ====
- John S. Rodgers, lieutenant governor of Vermont (2025–present) (ran for re-election)

==== Results ====
Republican primary results
Party	Candidate	Votes	%
Republican	Phil Scott (incumbent)	21,466	98.5
Write-in		333	1.5
Total votes		21,799	100.0

== Democratic primary ==
=== Candidates ===
==== Nominee ====
- Amanda Janoo, economist

==== Eliminated in primary ====
- Aly Richards, former lobbying group CEO

==== Did not file ====
- Jeffrey Wilson, Coventry Emergency Management Director

==== Declined ====
- Charity Clark, Vermont attorney general (2023–present) (ran for re-election)
- Mike Pieciak, Vermont state treasurer (2023–present) (ran for re-election)

=== Endorsements ===
Amanda Janoo

U.S. senators

- Bernie Sanders, Vermont (2007–present) (Independent)

Statewide officials

- David Zuckerman, former lieutenant governor of Vermont (2017–2021, 2023–2025) (Progressive)

Individuals

- Jerry Greenfield, activist and co-founder of Ben & Jerry's
- Christine Hallquist, political candidate and former CEO of the Vermont Electric Cooperative

Labor unions

- Vermont AFL-CIO
- Vermont State Employees' Association

Organizations

- Sierra Club Vermont

Political parties

- Vermont Progressive Party
Aly Richards

Executive branch officials

- Madeleine Kunin, former governor of Vermont (1985–1991) and ambassador to Switzerland (1996–1999)

Statewide officials

- Howard Dean, former governor of Vermont (1991–2003)
- Peter Shumlin, former governor of Vermont (2011–2017)

Labor unions

- Professional Fire Fighters of Vermont
- Vermont Building and Construction Trades Council

=== Polling ===
Poll source	Date(s) administered	Sample size (Note: Key: A – all adults RV – registered voters LV – likely voters V – unclear)	Margin of error	Amanda Janoo	Aly Richards	Other	Undecided
University of New Hampshire	July 15–20, 2026	560 (LV)	± 4.1%	26%	19%	3% (Note: "Write in someone else" with 3%)	52%
University of New Hampshire	June 18–23, 2026	511 (LV)	± 4.3%	20%	12%	3%	64%

=== Results ===
Municipality results: Janoo: 30–40%; 40–50%; 50–60%; 60–70%; 70–80%; Richards: 40–50%; 50–60%; 60–70%; 70–80%; 80–90%; Write-in: 50–60%; Tie: 30–40%; 40–50%; No votes

Democratic primary results
Party	Candidate	Votes	%
Democratic	Amanda Janoo	39,614	49.1
Democratic	Aly Richards	37,570	46.6
Write-in		3,509	4.3
Total votes		80,693	100.0

== Independent and third party candidates ==
=== Declared ===
- June Goodband (Green Mountain Peace and Justice Party), counselor and candidate for governor in 2024
- Brian Judd (Independent)
- Dean Roy (Freedom and Unity Party), high school student and former legislative page

== General election ==
=== Campaign ===
While Scott had historically won elections by landslide margins, the 2026 election was expected to be a much more competitive race. Scott was outraised by Janoo in September 2026, and Scott's vetoing of progressive bills was cited as a factor to his decline in crossover support.

=== Predictions ===
Source	Ranking	As of
The Cook Political Report	Likely R	October 29, 2026
Decision Desk HQ	Likely R	November 3, 2026
Fox News	Likely R	November 1, 2026
Inside Elections	Likely R	October 29, 2026
NBC News	Likely R	November 3, 2026
RealClearPolitics	Tossup	November 1, 2026
Sabato's Crystal Ball	Lean R	November 2, 2026
Silver Bulletin	Tossup	November 3, 2026

=== Post-primary endorsements ===
Amanda Janoo (D)

U.S. senators

- Bernie Sanders, Vermont (2007–present) (Independent)
- Peter Welch, Vermont (2023–present)

U.S. representatives

- Becca Balint, VT-AL (2023–present)
- Ro Khanna, CA-17 (2017–present)

=== Fundraising ===
Campaign finance reports as of October 30, 2026
Candidate	Raised	Spent
Phil Scott (R)	$719,911	$862,220
Amanda Janoo (D)	$1,072,487	$883,276
Source: Vermont Secretary of State

=== Polling ===
Poll source	Date(s) administered	Sample size	Margin of error	Phil Scott (R)	Amanda Janoo (D)	Other	Undecided
University of New Hampshire	October 27–31, 2026	1,172 (LV)	± 2.9%	43%	51%	6% (Note: Brian Judd (I) with 4%; Dean Roy (FU) with 1%, June Goodband (PJ) with <1%; "Another candidate" with 1%)	1%
State Navigate	October 23–25, 2026	1,752 (LV)	± 2.3%	49% (Note: With voters who lean towards a given candidate)	46%	2%	3%
State Navigate	October 23–25, 2026	1,752 (LV)	± 2.3%	48%	46%	1%	5%
State Navigate	October 2–4, 2026	948 (LV)	± 3.2%	46%	43%	4%	8%
State Navigate	October 2–4, 2026	948 (LV)	± 3.2%	43%	41%	2%	14%
Braun Research/Vermont Public	September 10–21, 2026	817 (RV)	± 3.4%	42%	32%	6% (Note: "None/Write-in/Other" with 3%; Brian Judd with 2%; Dean Roy with 1%; June Goodband with 0%)	20%
Braun Research/Vermont Public	September 10–21, 2026	737 (LV)	± 3.4%	44%	34%	5% (Note: "None/Write-in/Other" with 2%; Brian Judd with 2%; Dean Roy with 1%; June Goodband with 0%)	16%
University of New Hampshire	September 17–21, 2026	829 (LV)	± 3.3%	43%	49%	2% (Note: Brian Judd with 2%)	6%
	August 11, 2026	Primary elections					
University of New Hampshire	July 15–20, 2026	954 (LV)	± 3.2%	44%	33%	6% (Note: "Another candidate" with 3%; June Goodband with 2%; Dean Roy with 1%)	17%
University of New Hampshire	June 18–23, 2026	887 (LV)	± 3.3%	42%	27%	5% (Note: Dean Roy with 3%, June Goodband and "Write in someone else" at 1%)	26%

Hypothetical polling

Phil Scott vs. Aly Richards

Poll source	Date(s) administered	Sample size	Margin of error	Phil Scott (R)	Aly Richards (D)	Other	Undecided
University of New Hampshire	July 15–20, 2026	954 (LV)	± 3.2%	43%	35%	6% (Note: "Another candidate" with 3%; June Goodband with 2%; Dean Roy with 1%)	16%
University of New Hampshire	June 18–23, 2026	887 (LV)	± 3.3%	41%	25%	8% (Note: June Goodband with 6%, Dean Roy and "Write in someone else" at 1%)	26%

=== Results ===
2026 Vermont gubernatorial election
Party	Candidate	Votes	%	±%
Republican	Phil Scott (incumbent)	162,048	52.43%	−21.00
Democratic/Progressive	Amanda Janoo	141,631	45.83%	+24.00
Independent	Brian Judd	2,614	0.84%	N/A
Green Mountain Peace and Justice	June Goodband	1,227	0.40%	−0.84
Freedom and Unity	Dean Roy	1,137	0.37%	N/A
Write-in		398	0.13%	-0.12
Total votes		309,055	100.00%	
Republican hold				

==== By county ====
County	Phil Scott Republican		Amanda Janoo Democratic		Various candidates Other parties		Margin		Total
County	#	%	#	%	#	%	#	%	Total
Addison	10,016	50.73%	9,487	48.05%	242	1.23%	529	2.68%	19,745
Bennington	8,544	51.83%	7,449	45.19%	491	2.98%	1,095	6.64%	16,484
Caledonia	8,151	58.93%	5,376	38.87%	305	2.21%	2,775	20.06%	13,832
Chittenden	38,875	46.20%	44,450	52.83%	817	0.97%	-5,575	-6.63%	84,142
Essex	1,807	70.04%	665	25.78%	108	4.19%	1,142	44.26%	2,580
Franklin	14,275	66.97%	6,574	30.84%	466	2.19%	7,701	36.13%	21,315
Grand Isle	2,720	63.58%	1,495	34.95%	63	1.47%	1,225	28.63%	4,278
Lamoille	6,871	54.94%	5,433	43.44%	202	1.62%	1,438	11.50%	12,506
Orange	8,259	55.44%	6,342	42.58%	295	1.98%	1,917	12.86%	14,896
Orleans	7,578	65.30%	3,700	31.88%	327	2.82%	3,878	33.42%	11,605
Rutland	17,305	64.51%	8,960	33.40%	559	2.08%	8,345	31.11%	26,824
Washington	15,149	48.72%	15,501	49.86%	442	1.42%	-352	-1.14%	31,092
Windham	8,363	39.04%	12,661	59.11%	396	1.85%	-4,298	-20.07%	21,420
Windsor	14,135	49.88%	13,538	47.78%	663	2.34%	597	2.10%	28,336
Totals	162,048	52.43%	141,631	45.83%	5,376	1.74%	20,417	6.60%	309,055

Counties that flipped from Independent to Democratic

- Chittenden (largest municipality: Burlington)
- Washington (largest municipality: Barre)
- Windham (largest municipality: Brattleboro)

== See also ==
- 2026 United States elections
- 2026 United States House of Representatives election in Vermont
