= 2022 Vermont gubernatorial election =

- November 8, 2022
- Turnout: 57.62% ▼
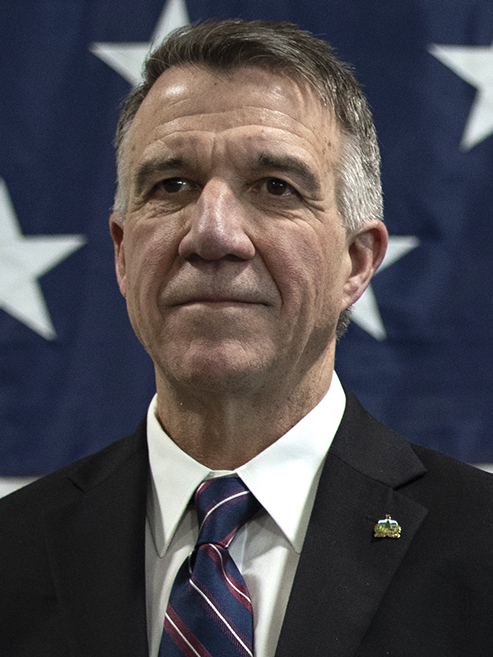

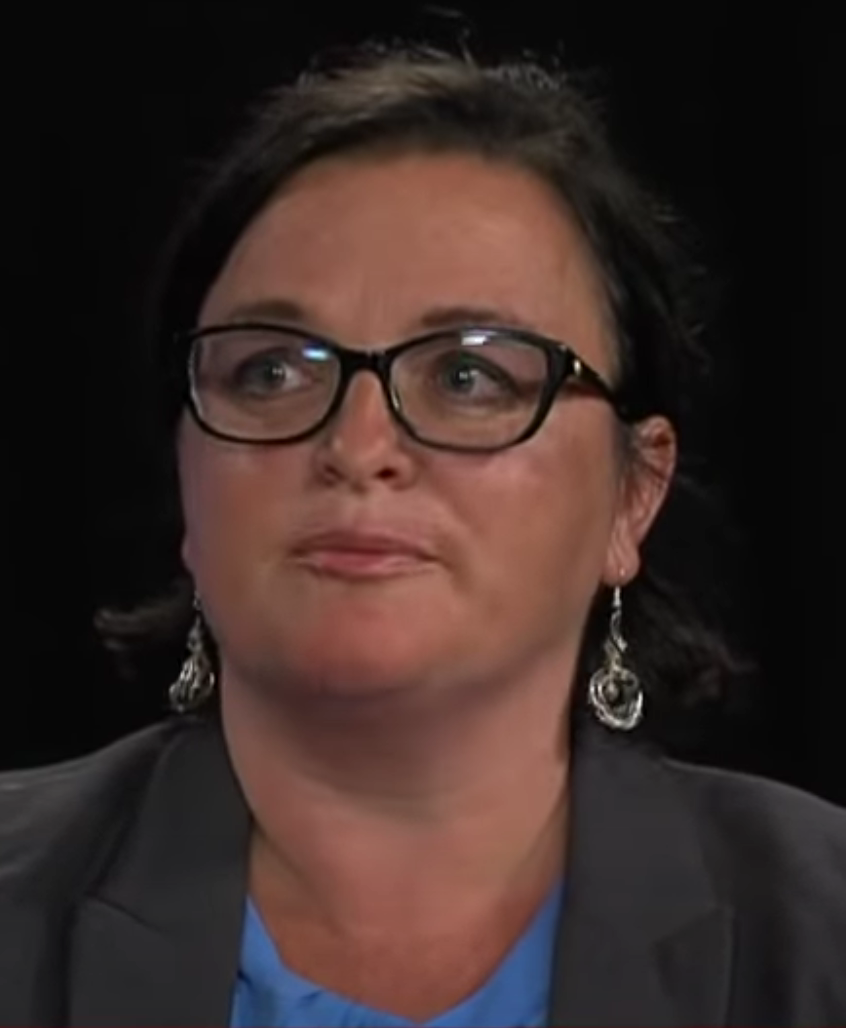
Nominee	Phil Scott	Brenda Siegel
Party	Republican	Democratic
Alliance		Progressive
Popular vote	202,147	68,248
Percentage	70.91%	23.94%
- Scott: 50–60% 60–70% 70–80% 80–90% Siegel: 50–60% No votes
Governor before election
Phil Scott
Republican
Elected Governor
Phil Scott
Republican

The 2022 Vermont gubernatorial election was held on November 8, 2022, to elect the governor of Vermont. Incumbent Republican governor Phil Scott won re-election to a fourth term in a landslide, defeating Democratic nominee Brenda Siegel.

This race was one of six Republican-held governorships up for election in 2022 in a state carried by Joe Biden in the 2020 presidential election. During the 2022 season, Scott enjoyed one of the highest approval ratings of any governor in the nation, and was expected to easily win reelection. As such, he carried every municipality in the state in which votes were cast, this time with the largest margin in a Vermont gubernatorial race since Howard Dean's landslide in 1996. Scott's 47-point victory margin was the largest for a Republican candidate since 1950, even while Democratic congressman Peter Welch won the concurrent U.S. Senate election by a 40-point margin. This was the second-most lopsided gubernatorial election of the 2022 cycle, only behind the election in Wyoming.

== Republican primary ==
=== Candidates ===
==== Nominee ====
- Phil Scott, incumbent governor

==== Eliminated in primary ====
- Stephen Bellows, landscaping contractor
- Peter Duval, engineer and former Underhill selectman

==== Declined ====
- H. Brooke Paige, historian and perennial candidate (running for multiple statewide offices) (Note: Republican candidate for U.S. Senate in 2012 and 2018; Democratic candidate for Attorney General in 2014 and 2016; Republican nominee for Attorney General in 2018 and 2020; Democratic candidate for Governor in 2014 and 2016; Republican nominee for Secretary of State in 2018 and 2020; Republican candidate for the US House in 2018; Republican candidate for Auditor of Accounts in 2018.)

=== Results ===
Results by county: Scott: 60–70%; 70–80%

Republican primary results
Party	Candidate	Votes	%
Republican	Phil Scott (incumbent)	20,319	68.56%
Republican	Stephen C. Bellows	5,402	18.22%
Republican	Peter Duval	3,627	12.24%
Write-in		290	0.98%
Total votes		29,638	100.0%

== Progressive primary ==
=== Candidates ===
==== Withdrew after winning primary ====
- Susan Hatch Davis, former state representative

==== Replacement nominee ====
- Brenda Siegel, nonprofit executive, candidate for governor in 2018, and candidate for lieutenant governor in 2020 (cross-endorsement of Democratic nominee)

=== Results ===
Progressive primary results
Party	Candidate	Votes	%
Progressive	Susan Hatch Davis	470	87.36%
Write-in		68	12.64%
Total votes		538	100.0%

== Democratic primary ==
=== Candidates ===
==== Nominee ====
- Brenda Siegel, nonprofit executive, candidate for governor in 2018, and candidate for lieutenant governor in 2020

==== Declined ====
- Becca Balint, President pro tempore of the Vermont Senate (running for U.S. House)
- T. J. Donovan, former Vermont Attorney General
- Molly Gray, Lieutenant Governor of Vermont (ran for U.S. House)
- Jill Krowinski, Speaker of the Vermont House of Representatives (running for re-election)
- Doug Racine, former lieutenant governor of Vermont and candidate for governor in 2002 and 2010

=== Endorsements ===
Brenda Siegel

Federal politicians

- Peter Welch, U.S. representative for Vermont's at-large congressional district

State politicians

- Becca Balint, president pro tempore of the Vermont Senate
- Howard Dean, former governor of Vermont and former chair of the Democratic National Committee

=== Results ===
Democratic primary results
Party	Candidate	Votes	%
Democratic	Brenda Siegel	56,287	85.92%
Write-in		9,227	14.08%
Total votes		65,514	100.0%

== Independents ==
=== Candidates ===
==== Declared ====
- Peter Duval, engineer and former Underhill selectman
- Kevin Hoyt, candidate for governor in 2020
- Bernard Peters, perennial candidate

== Write-ins ==
Due to Vermont's completely unrestricted write-in laws, many high school students across the United States were legally able to run for governor.

=== Candidates ===
==== Declared ====
- Jackson Williams, high school student from Las Vegas
- Landon Best, high school student from Indiana

== General election ==
=== Predictions ===
Source	Ranking	As of
The Cook Political Report	Solid R	March 4, 2022
Inside Elections	Solid R	July 22, 2022
Sabato's Crystal Ball	Safe R	August 18, 2022
Politico	Solid R	November 3, 2022
RCP	Safe R	November 1, 2022
Fox News	Solid R	August 22, 2022
538	Solid R	August 26, 2022
Elections Daily	Safe R	November 7, 2022

=== Polling ===
Graphical summary

Poll source	Date(s) administered	Sample size (Note: Key: A – all adults RV – registered voters LV – likely voters V – unclear)	Margin of error	Phil Scott (R)	Brenda Siegel (D/P)	Other	Undecided
Data for Progress (D)	October 21–26, 2022	1,039 (LV)	± 3.0%	65%	24%	5% (Note: Hoyt (I) with 3%; Duval (I) with 1%; Peters (I) with 1%)	6%
University of New Hampshire	September 29 – October 3, 2022	865 (LV)	± 3.5%	48%	31%	9% (Note: Hoyt and Duval with 3%; Peters with 2%; "Other" with 1%)	13%
The Trafalgar Group (R)	September 3–7, 2022	1,072 (LV)	± 2.9%	68%	15%	5%	12%
University of New Hampshire	July 21–25, 2022	651 (LV)	± 3.8%	60%	16%	8% (Note: Davis and "Other" with 4%)	16%

Hypothetical polling

Phil Scott vs. generic opponent

Poll source	Date(s) administered	Sample size	Margin of error	Phil Scott (R)	Generic Opponent	Undecided
University of New Hampshire	April 14–18, 2022	583 (LV)	± 4.1%	50%	25%	24%

=== Results ===

2022 Vermont gubernatorial election
Party	Candidate	Votes	%	±%
Republican	Phil Scott (incumbent)	202,147	70.91%	+0.75
Democratic/Progressive	Brenda Siegel (Note: Candidate received the nominations of both the Democratic and Progressive parties and will be listed on the ballot as "Democratic/Progressive" (candidate is primarily a Democrat).)	68,248	23.94%	
Independent	Kevin Hoyt	6,022	2.06%	+0.80
Independent	Peter Duval	4,723	1.62%	N/A
Independent	Bernard Peters	2,315	0.79%	N/A
Write-in		1,346	0.46%	+0.02
Total votes		284,801	100%	
Rejected ballots		255		
Blank ballots		6,899		
Turnout		291,955	57.62%	
Registered electors		506,666		
Republican hold				

==== By county ====
By county

County	Phil Scott Republican		Brenda Siegel Democratic		Various candidates Other parties	
County	#	%	#	%	#	%
Addison	12,856	71.45%	4,447	24.72%	690	3.83%
Bennington	10,642	67.24%	3,741	23.64%	1,444	9.12%
Caledonia	9,507	74.51%	2,425	19.0%	828	6.49%
Chittenden	52,215	68.88%	21,193	27.96%	2,401	3.16%
Essex	1,880	79.16%	314	13.22%	181	7.62%
Franklin	15,667	79.53%	2,741	13.91%	1,291	6.56%
Grand Isle	3,115	78.78%	654	16.54%	185	4.68%
Lamoille	8,625	75.21%	2,317	20.2%	526	4.59%
Orange	10,013	72.36%	3,137	22.67%	687	4.97%
Orleans	7,840	73.62%	1,755	16.48%	1,054	9.9%
Rutland	20,134	77.03%	4,307	16.48%	1,696	6.49%
Washington	18,938	68.07%	7,799	28.03%	1,086	3.9%
Windham	11,737	59.7%	6,887	35.03%	1,035	5.27%
Windsor	18,978	70.78%	6,531	24.36%	1,302	4.86%
Totals	202,147	70.98%	68,248	23.96%	14,406	5.06%

== See also ==
- 2022 Vermont elections
