= 2022 United States House of Representatives election in Vermont =

2022 United States House of Representatives election in Vermont's at-large district
- November 8, 2022
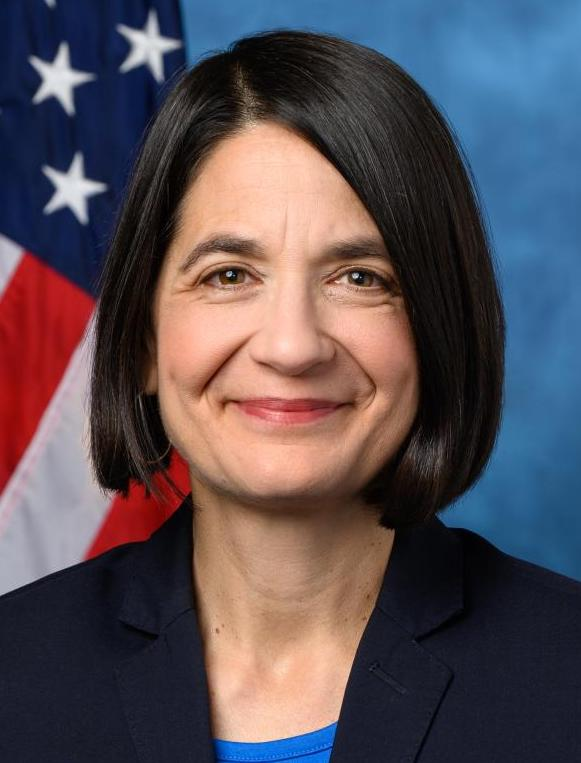

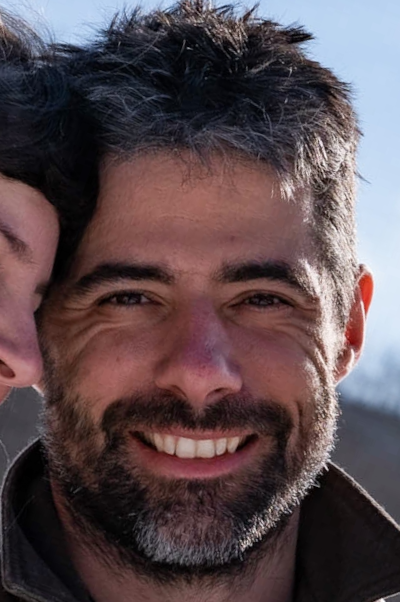
Nominee	Becca Balint	Liam Madden
Party	Democratic	Republican
Popular vote	176,494	78,397
Percentage	60.45%	26.85%
- Balint: 40–50% 50–60% 60–70% 70–80% 80–90% >90% Madden: 30–40% 40–50% 50–60% No votes
U.S. Representative before election
Peter Welch
Democratic
Elected U.S. Representative
Becca Balint
Democratic

The 2022 United States House of Representatives election in Vermont was held on November 8, 2022, to elect the U.S. representative from Vermont's at-large congressional district. The election coincided with other elections to the House of Representatives, elections to the U.S. Senate, as well as various other state and local elections.

Incumbent Democrat Peter Welch was re-elected with 67.3% of the vote in 2020. After eight-term U.S. Senator Patrick Leahy announced he would retire on November 15, some speculated that Welch might decline to seek re-election and instead seek election to the Senate. On November 22, 2021, Welch announced his candidacy for Leahy's seat, creating the first open U.S. House seat in Vermont since Bernie Sanders ran for the U.S. Senate in 2006.

Democratic nominee Becca Balint won the election in a landslide, becoming the first elected female member of the United States Congress in the state's history. Her main opponent in the general election, Liam Madden, won the Republican nomination but identifies as an independent who opposes the two-party system. Madden stated that he would not caucus with House Republicans if elected to Congress; the Vermont Republican Party later disavowed his campaign. Ericka Redic, who lost the Republican primary to Madden, ran in the general election as the nominee of the Libertarian Party.

Vermont was the last remaining state that had never elected a woman to the United States Congress after Mississippi elected its first woman, Cindy Hyde-Smith, in 2018. With Balint's victory, every U.S. state has now been represented in Congress by a woman at some point. Balint is also the first openly LGBTQ person to be elected to Congress from Vermont.

== Democratic primary ==
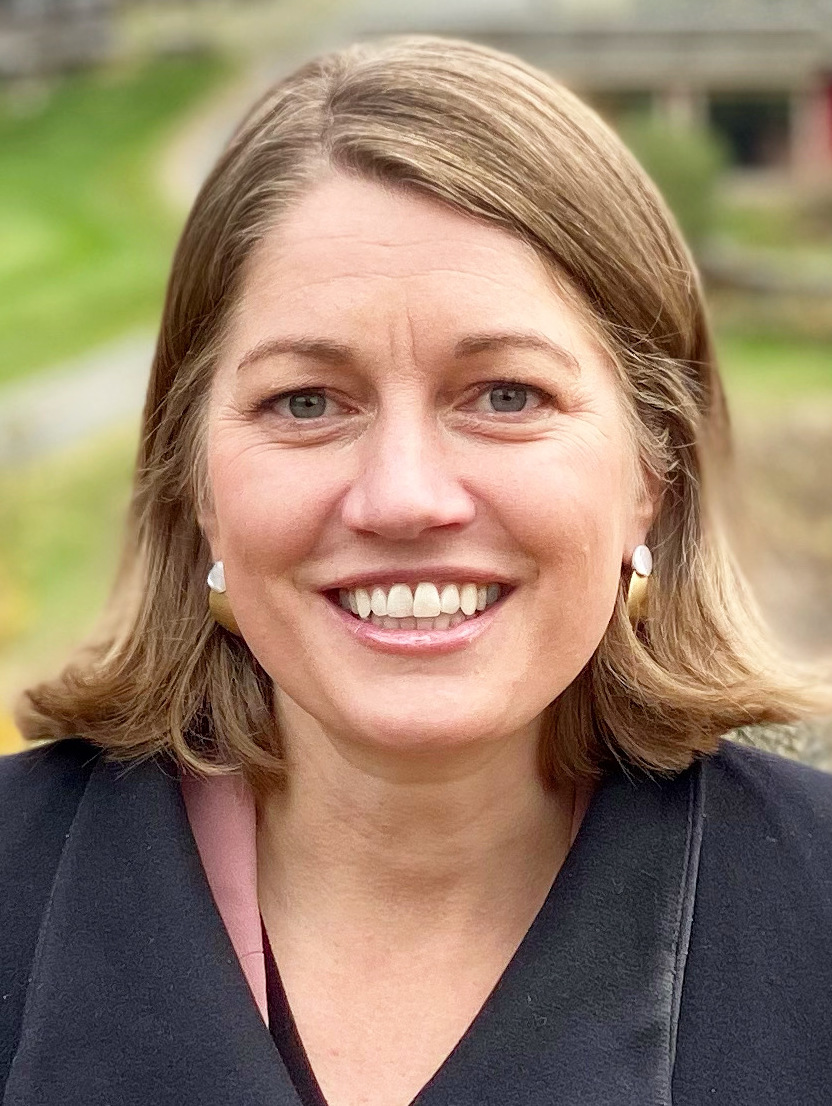
Lieutenant Governor Molly Gray finished second in the primary.

A somewhat crowded initial primary field featuring Vermont Senate president pro tempore Becca Balint, Lieutenant Governor Molly Gray, state senator Kesha Ram Hinsdale, former congressional staffer Sianay Chase Clifford, and physician Louis Meyers was eventually winnowed down to Balint, Gray, and Meyers following the withdrawals of Ram and Chase Clifford in mid-2022. Balint received the support of Senator Bernie Sanders, and national leaders of the progressive movement such as Elizabeth Warren and Pramila Jayapal, the latter of whom backed Balint after Ram withdrew. Ram herself also supported Balint following her withdrawal. Gray received backing from members of Vermont's Democratic establishment, such as Senator Patrick Leahy and former governors Madeleine Kunin and Howard Dean.

=== Candidates ===
==== Nominee ====
- Becca Balint, state senator (2015–2023) and Vermont Senate president pro tempore (2021–2023)

==== Eliminated in primary ====
- Molly Gray, Lieutenant Governor of Vermont (2021–2023)
- Louis Meyers, physician at Rutland Regional Medical Center

==== Withdrew ====
- Sianay Chase Clifford, former aide to U.S. Representative Ayanna Pressley
- Kesha Ram Hinsdale, state senator (2021–present) and candidate for lieutenant governor in 2016 (endorsed Balint; successfully ran for re-election)

==== Declined ====
- T. J. Donovan, Vermont Attorney General (2017–2022)
- Jill Krowinski, Speaker of the Vermont House of Representatives (2021–present)
- Deborah Markowitz, former Vermont Secretary of State (1999–2011)
- Tanya Vyhovsky, state representative (2021–2023) (Note: Candidate is a member of the Progressive Party, but ran with the Democratic Party's endorsement under Vermont's electoral fusion system) (successfully ran for state senate)
- Peter Welch, incumbent U.S. Representative (2007–2023) (successfully ran for U.S. Senate)

=== Endorsements ===
Becca Balint

U.S. Senators

- Ed Markey, U.S. Senator from Massachusetts (2013–present)
- Bernie Sanders, U.S. Senator from Vermont (2007–present)
- Elizabeth Warren, U.S. Senator from Massachusetts (2013–present)

U.S. Representatives

- David Ciciline, U.S. Representative for Rhode Island's 1st congressional district (2011–present)
- Pramila Jayapal, U.S. Representative for Washington's 7th congressional district (2017–present) (previously endorsed Ram)
- Ro Khanna, U.S. Representative for California's 17th congressional district (2017–present)
- Mark Pocan, U.S. Representative for Wisconsin's 2nd congressional district (2013–present)
- Jamie Raskin, U.S. Representative for Maryland's 8th congressional district (2017–present)
- Mark Takano, U.S. Representative for California's 41st congressional district (2013–present)

State officials

- Beth Pearce, Vermont State Treasurer (2011–present)

State legislators

- Philip Baruth, State Senator D/P-Chittenden
- John Campbell, former state senator D-Windsor and former President pro tempore of the Vermont Senate
- Alison H. Clarkson, State Senator D-Windsor
- Peter Conlon, State Representative D-Addison 2 (2017–present)
- Sarah Copeland-Hanzas, State Representative, D-Bradford
- Ann Cummings, State Senator D-Washington
- Mitzi Johnson, former Speaker of the Vermont House of Representatives
- Jane Kitchel, State Senator D-Caledonia
- Ginny Lyons, State Senator D-Chittenden
- Dick Mazza, State Senator D-Grand Isle and Dean of the Senate
- Andrew Perchlik, State Senator D/P-Washington
- Kesha Ram Hinsdale, State Senator, D-Chittenden
- Laura Sibilia, State Representative I-Windham-Bennington (2015–present)
- Robert Starr, State Senator D-Essex/Orleans
- Mary Sullivan, former state representative from Chittenden 7-1 (1991–2001) and Chittenden 6-5 (2015–2021)
- Jeanette White, State Senator D-Windham

Individuals

- Bill McKibben, environmental activist and author (previously endorsed Ram)

Labor unions

- American Federation of Teachers Vermont
- Vermont Building Trades Council
- Vermont State Firefighters' Association

Organizations

- Brand New Congress (previously endorsed Ram)
- Congressional Progressive Caucus PAC
- Equality PAC
- Human Rights Campaign
- League of Conservation Voters
- LGBTQ Victory Fund
- LPAC
- NARAL Pro-Choice America (post-primary)
- Progressive Change Campaign Committee
- Protect Our Future
- Sierra Club
Sianay Chase Clifford (withdrew)

Organizations

- Vermont Progressive Party
Molly Gray

Executive branch officials

- Madeleine Kunin, Governor of Vermont (1985–1991), U.S. Ambassador to Liechtenstein (1997–1999), U.S. Ambassador to Switzerland (1996–1999), U.S. Deputy Secretary of Education (1993–1996), Lieutenant Governor of Vermont (1979–1983)

U.S. Senators

- Patrick Leahy, President pro tempore of the United States Senate (2012-2015, 2021-2023) and U.S. Senator from Vermont (1975–2023)

State officials

- Howard Dean, former governor of Vermont (1991–2003) and chair of the Democratic National Committee (2005–2009)
Kesha Ram (withdrew)

U.S. Representatives

- ~~Pramila Jayapal, U.S. Representative for Washington's 7th congressional district (2017–present)~~ (switched endorsement to Balint after Ram withdrew)

State legislators

- Hal Colston, State Representative from Chittenden 6-7 (2019–present)
- Mari Cordes, State Representative from Addison 4 (2019–present) (Progressive)
- Jim McCullough, State Representative from Chittenden-2 (2003–present)
- Taylor Small, State Representative from Chittenden 6-7 (2021–present) (Progressive)

State legislators

- Nina Turner, former Ohio State Senator from the 25th district (2008–2014) and national co-chair of the 2020 Bernie Sanders presidential campaign

Individuals

- ~~Bill McKibben, environmental activist and author~~ (switched endorsement to Balint after Ram withdrew)

Labor unions

- Communications Workers of America District 1
- Vermont AFL–CIO

Organizations

- ~~Brand New Congress~~ (switched endorsement to Balint after Ram withdrew)

=== Polling ===
==== Graphical summary ====
Poll source	Date(s) administered	Sample size (Note: Key: A – all adults RV – registered voters LV – likely voters V – unclear)	Margin of error	Becca Balint	Sianay Chase Clifford	Molly Gray	Louis Meyers	Kesha Ram	Other	Undecided
Data for Progress (D)	July 27 – August 1, 2022	383 (LV)	± 5.0%	59%	1%	27%	1%	–	–	12%
University of New Hampshire	July 21–25, 2022	352 (LV)	± 5.2%	63%	–	21%	2%	–	0%	13%
	July 19, 2022	Sianay Chase Clifford drops out of the race								
	May 27, 2022	Kesha Ram drops out of the race								
University of New Hampshire	April 14–18, 2022	278 (LV)	± 5.9%	28%	0%	21%	–	19%	1%	31%
VPR/Vermont PBS	January 3–9, 2022	418 (LV)	± 4.8%	11%	–	31%	–	0%	12%	47%

=== Debate ===
2022 United States House of Representatives election in Vermont democratic primary debate
No.	Date	Host	Moderator	Link	Democratic	Democratic	Democratic	Democratic
Key: P Participant A Absent N Not invited I Invited W Withdrawn								
Key: P Participant A Absent N Not invited I Invited W Withdrawn					Becca Balint	Sianay Chase Clifford	Molly Gray	Louis Meyers
1	Jul. 6, 2022	WPTZ	Brian Colleran; Alice Kang; Stewart Ledbetter		P	P	P	P

=== Results ===
Democratic primary results by municipality Balint: 40–50%; 50–60%; 60–70%; 70–80%; 80–90%; 90–100%; Gray: 40–50%; 50–60%; 60–70%; 70–80%; 80–90%; 90–100%; Tie

Democratic primary results
Party	Candidate	Votes	%
Democratic	Becca Balint	61,025	60.6%
Democratic	Molly Gray	37,266	37.0%
Democratic	Louis Meyers	1,593	1.6%
Democratic	Sianay Chase Clifford (withdrawn)	885	0.9%
Total votes		100,769	100.0%

== Republican primary ==
=== Candidates ===
==== Nominee ====
- Liam Madden, former leader of About Face: Veterans Against the War

==== Eliminated in primary ====
- Ericka Redic, businesswoman and community activist
- Anya Tynio, sales representative, nominee for this district in 2018 and candidate in 2020

==== Declined ====
- Felisha Leffler, state representative (2019–present)
- Heidi Scheuermann, state representative (2007–present)
- Phil Scott, Governor of Vermont (2017–present) (running for re-election)

=== Polling ===
Poll source	Date(s) administered	Sample size	Margin of error	Liam Madden	Ericka Redic	Anya Tynio	Undecided
University of New Hampshire	July 21–25, 2022	196 (LV)	± 7.0%	14%	15%	9%	61%

=== Results ===
Liam Madden won the primary in a surprise victory, as Redic was considered the frontrunner. The Vermont Republican Party disavowed Madden's campaign following a meeting with him on August 15, less than a week after his victory in the primary, citing his refusal to commit to caucusing with the Republican Party if he won the election. Redic announced that she would continue her campaign into the general election as the candidate of the Libertarian Party of Vermont.

Republican primary results
Party	Candidate	Votes	%
Republican	Liam Madden	10,701	41.4%
Republican	Ericka Bundy Redic	8,255	31.9%
Republican	Anya Tynio	6,908	26.7%
Total votes		25,864	100.0%

== Progressive primary ==
=== Candidates ===
==== Withdrew after winning primary ====
- Barbara Nolfi, clinic co-founder

==== Declined ====
- Tanya Vyhovsky, state representative (2021–present) (running for state senate)

=== Results ===
Progressive primary results
Party	Candidate	Votes	%
Progressive	Barbara Nolfi	439	100.0
Total votes		439	100.0

== Independents and other parties ==
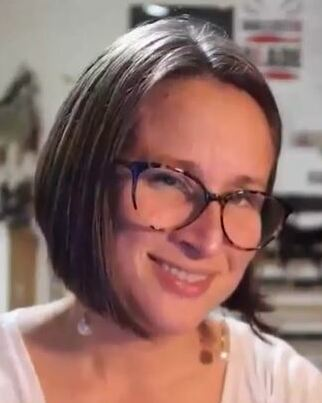
Businesswoman Ericka Redic, the runner-up in the Republican primary, was the Libertarian nominee.

=== Candidates ===
==== Declared ====
- Matt Druzba (independent)
- Adam Ortiz
- Ericka Redic (Libertarian), businesswoman and community activist (previously Republican)
- Luke Talbot

==== Withdrawn ====
- Bryan Braga (Communist)

== General election ==
=== Debate ===
2022 Vermont U.S. House of Representatives debate
No.	Date	Host	Moderator	Link	Democratic	Republican
Key: P Participant A Absent N Not invited I Invited W Withdrawn						
Key: P Participant A Absent N Not invited I Invited W Withdrawn					Becca Balint	Liam Madden
1	Oct. 11, 2022	Vermont Public	Connor Cyrus		P	P

=== Predictions ===
Source	Ranking	As of
The Cook Political Report	Solid D	October 5, 2021
Inside Elections	Solid D	October 11, 2021
Sabato's Crystal Ball	Safe D	October 5, 2021
Politico	Solid D	April 5, 2022
RCP	Safe D	June 9, 2022
Fox News	Solid D	July 11, 2022
DDHQ	Solid D	July 20, 2022
538	Solid D	June 30, 2022

=== Polling ===
Poll source	Date(s) administered	Sample size	Margin of error	Becca Balint (D)	Liam Madden (R)	Ericka Redic (L)	Other	Undecided
Data for Progress (D)	October 21–26, 2022	1,039 (LV)	± 3.0%	54%	29%	5%	3% (Note: Talbot (I), Oritz (I), and Druzba (I) with 1%)	9%
University of New Hampshire	September 29 – October 3, 2022	765 (LV)	± 3.5%	57%	19%	9%	11% (Note: Talbot (I) and "Other" with 1%; Ortiz (I) and Druzba (I) with 0%)	12%

Hypothetical polling

Becca Balint vs. Marcia Horne

Poll source	Date(s) administered	Sample size	Margin of error	Becca Balint (D)	Marcia Horne (R)	Other	Undecided
University of New Hampshire	April 14–18, 2022	583 (LV)	± 4.1%	48%	25%	0%	26%

Sianay Chase Clifford vs. Marcia Horne

Poll source	Date(s) administered	Sample size	Margin of error	Sianay Chase Clifford (D)	Marcia Horne (R)	Other	Undecided
University of New Hampshire	April 14–18, 2022	583 (LV)	± 4.1%	42%	25%	0%	33%

Molly Gray vs. Marcia Horne

Poll source	Date(s) administered	Sample size	Margin of error	Molly Gray (D)	Marcia Horne (R)	Other	Undecided
University of New Hampshire	April 14–18, 2022	583 (LV)	± 4.1%	49%	27%	1%	23%

Kesha Ram vs. Marcia Horne

Poll source	Date(s) administered	Sample size	Margin of error	Kesha Ram (D)	Marcia Horne (R)	Other	Undecided
University of New Hampshire	April 14–18, 2022	583 (LV)	± 4.1%	47%	26%	0%	27%

=== Results ===
2022 Vermont's at-large congressional district election
Party	Candidate	Votes	%	±%
Democratic	Becca Balint	176,494	60.45%	–6.86%
Republican	Liam Madden	78,297	26.85%	–0.16%
Libertarian	Ericka Redic	12,590	4.31%	N/A
Independent	Matt Druzba	5,737	1.97%	N/A
Independent	Luke Talbot	4,428	1.52%	N/A
Independent	Adam Ortiz	3,376	1.16%	N/A
Write-in		1,004	0.34%	+0.19%
Total votes		291,955	100.00%	
Democratic hold				

==== By county ====
County	Becca Balint Democratic		Liam Madden Republican		Various candidates Other parties	
County	#	%	#	%	#	%
Addison	11,471	64.5%	4,683	26.3%	1,632	9.2%
Bennington	9,276	59.4%	4,927	31.6%	1,409	9.0%
Caledonia	6,646	52.9%	4,420	35.2%	1,491	11.9%
Chittenden	53,864	71.7%	14,556	19.4%	6,677	8.9%
Essex	889	37.6%	1,057	44.7%	421	17.8%
Franklin	9,300	48.1%	7,594	39.3%	2,426	12.5%
Grand Isle	2,189	56.0%	1,264	32.3%	455	11.6%
Lamoille	7,245	64.4%	2,932	26.1%	1,065	9.4%
Orange	7,855	57.4%	4,539	33.2%	1,290	9.4%
Orleans	5,091	48.3%	4,098	38.8%	1,361	12.8%
Rutland	12,476	48.2%	10,050	38.8%	3,364	13.0%
Washington	18,716	68.0%	6,577	23.9%	2,244	8.1%
Windham	14,299	71.9%	4,445	27.3%	1,156	5.9%
Windsor	17,177	64.6%	7,255	27.3%	2,144	8.0%
Totals	176,494	62.6%	78,397	27.8%	27,135	9.6%

Counties that flipped from Democratic to Republican

- Essex (largest city: Lunenburg)
