= 2022 United States Senate election in Vermont =

- November 8, 2022
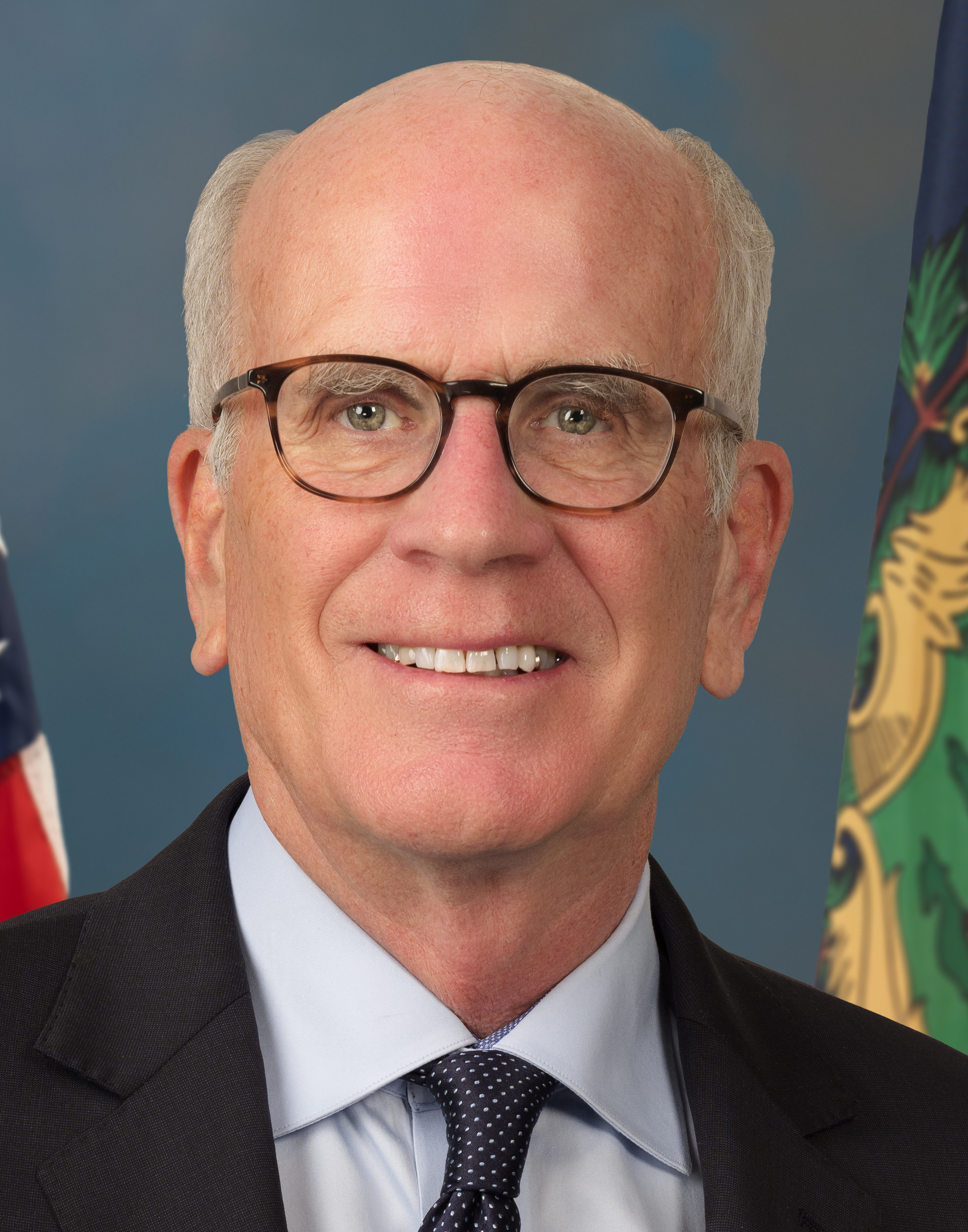

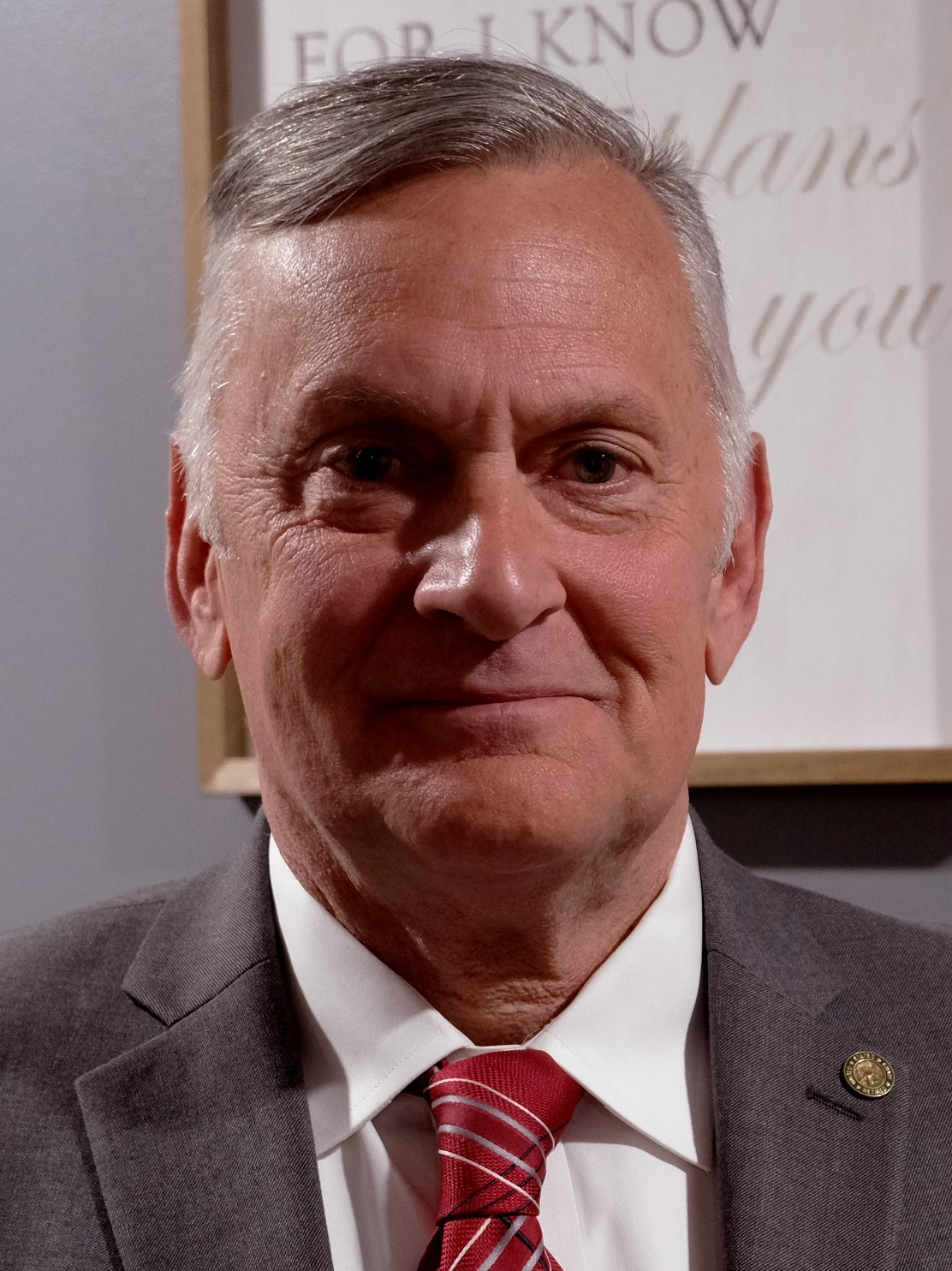
Nominee	Peter Welch	Gerald Malloy
Party	Democratic	Republican
Popular vote	196,575	80,468
Percentage	68.47%	28.03%
- Welch: 40–50% 50–60% 60–70% 70–80% 80–90% >90% Malloy: 40–50% 50–60% 60–70% Tie: 40–50% No votes
U.S. senator before election
Patrick Leahy
Democratic
Elected U.S. senator
Peter Welch
Democratic

The 2022 United States Senate election in Vermont was held on November 8, 2022, to elect a member of the United States Senate to represent the state of Vermont. It was held concurrently with U.S. Senate elections in other states, along with elections to the United States House of Representatives and various state and local elections across the country. The incumbent senator, Democrat Patrick Leahy, announced on November 15, 2021, that he would not seek re-election to a ninth term, leaving the seat open for the first time since 1974, when Leahy was first elected.

Primary elections were held on August 9, 2022, with Peter Welch, the incumbent U.S. Representative from the state's at-large congressional district, winning the Democratic primary, while U.S. Army veteran Gerald Malloy won the Republican primary. In heavily Democratic Vermont, the Democratic nomination is tantamount to election, and on election day, Welch defeated Malloy in a landslide. He won all but one county in the state, garnering 68.5% of the vote statewide to Malloy's 28.0%. The race was called for Welch shortly after polls closed.

At 75 years old, Welch became the oldest person ever elected to a first term in the Senate, a record previously held by Massachusetts Republican Frederick H. Gillett, elected in 1924 at age 73. He also became only the second Democrat ever elected to the Senate from Vermont, after Leahy.

== Democratic primary ==
Following Leahy's announcement that he would retire, speculation arose as to which Democrats could run to succeed him; Newsweek cited two of the leading possible contenders for the nomination as Peter Welch, who had served as U.S. Representative for Vermont's at-large congressional district since 2006, and President pro tempore of the Vermont Senate Becca Balint. Also considering a run was state representative Tanya Vyhovsky. However, candidates were reluctant to enter the race due to speculation that Bernie Sanders, Vermont's popular junior senator, would endorse Welch for the open seat. It was widely considered that an endorsement from Sanders would essentially lock up the race for Welch. While both men were both considered to be associated with the left wing of the Democratic Party, Welch was noted by The Intercept to be rather more moderate than Sanders was, especially when compared to Vyhovsky.

Welch announced his campaign for the seat on November 22, 2021, pledging in a campaign video to support Medicare for All and the Green New Deal; he was immediately endorsed by Sanders.

=== Candidates ===
==== Nominee ====
- Peter Welch, U.S. Representative for Vermont's at-large congressional district

==== Eliminated in primary ====
- Isaac Evans-Frantz, peace activist
- Niki Thran, physician

==== Declined ====
- Becca Balint, President pro tempore of the Vermont Senate (ran for and elected to U.S. House)
- Sarah Copeland-Hanzas, state representative
- T. J. Donovan, Vermont Attorney General
- Molly Gray, Lieutenant Governor of Vermont (ran for U.S. House)
- Christine Hallquist, businesswoman and nominee for Governor of Vermont in 2018
- Jill Krowinski, Speaker of the Vermont House of Representatives
- Patrick Leahy, incumbent U.S. senator and president pro tempore
- Kesha Ram Hinsdale, state senator and candidate for lieutenant governor in 2016 (endorsed Welch; ran for and won re-election)
- Tanya Vyhovsky, state representative (Note: Candidate is a member of the Progressive Party, but ran with the Democratic Party's endorsement under Vermont's electoral fusion system) (ran for and elected to state senate)
- David Zuckerman, former lieutenant governor of Vermont and Democratic and Progressive nominee for governor in 2020 (ran for and elected lieutenant governor)

=== Endorsements ===
Isaac Evans-Frantz

Organizations

- Vermont Progressive Party
Peter Welch

U.S. Senators

- Bernie Sanders, U.S. Senator from Vermont (2007–present), former U.S. Representative for Vermont's at-large congressional district (1991–2007), and candidate for President of the United States in 2016 and 2020

State legislators

- Kesha Ram Hinsdale, state senator (2021–present) and candidate for lieutenant governor in 2016

Organizations

- Council for a Livable World
- End Citizens United
- Giffords
- League of Conservation Voters
- NARAL Pro-Choice America
- Population Connection Action Fund

Labor unions

- Communications Workers of America

=== Polling ===
Poll source	Date(s) administered	Sample size (Note: Key: A – all adults RV – registered voters LV – likely voters V – unclear)	Margin of error	Isaac Evans-Frantz	Niki Thran	Peter Welch	Other	Undecided
University of New Hampshire	July 21–25, 2022	352 (LV)	± 5.2%	6%	1%	82%	0%	10%

=== Results ===
Results by county Welch: 70–80%; 80–90%; 90–100%

Democratic primary results
Party	Candidate	Votes	%
Democratic	Peter Welch	86,603	87.01%
Democratic	Isaac Evans-Frantz	7,230	7.26%
Democratic	Niki Thran	5,104	5.13%
Write-in		599	0.60%
Total votes		99,536	100.0%

== Republican primary ==
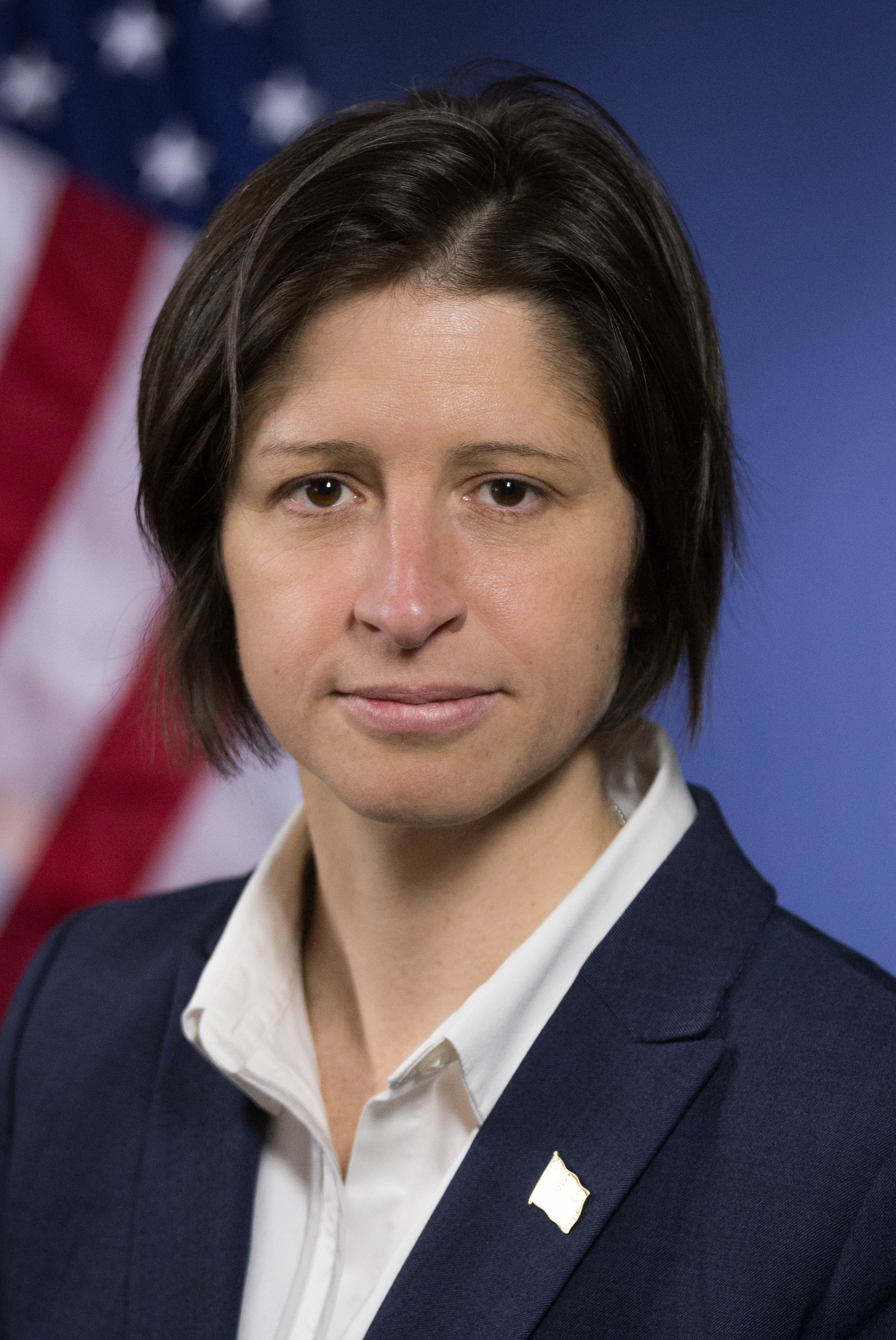
Former U.S. Attorney Christina Nolan finished second in the primary.

=== Candidates ===
==== Nominee ====
- Gerald Malloy, businessman and retired U.S. Army officer

==== Eliminated in primary ====
- Myers Mermel, commercial real estate banker
- Christina Nolan, former U.S. Attorney for the District of Vermont

==== Declined ====
- Jim Douglas, former governor of Vermont and nominee for U.S. Senate in 1992
- Phil Scott, Governor of Vermont (endorsed Nolan; running for re-election)

=== Endorsements ===
Myers Mermel

Governors

- Mike Huckabee, former Governor of Arkansas (1996–2007)

Organizations

- Huck PAC
Christina Nolan

U.S. Senators

- Susan Collins, U.S. Senator from Maine (1997–present)
- Mitch McConnell, Senate Minority Leader and U.S. Senator from Kentucky (1985–present)

Governors

- Jim Douglas, former governor of Vermont (2003–2011)
- Phil Scott, Governor of Vermont (2017–present)

=== Polling ===
Poll source	Date(s) administered	Sample size	Margin of error	Gerald Malloy	Myers Mermel	Christina Nolan	Undecided
University of New Hampshire	July 21–25, 2022	196 (LV)	± 7.0%	30%	3%	24%	43%

=== Results ===
Results by county Malloy: 40–50%; 50–60%; Nolan: 30–40%; 40–50%; 50–60%

Republican primary results
Party	Candidate	Votes	%
Republican	Gerald Malloy	12,169	42.39%
Republican	Christina Nolan	10,825	37.70%
Republican	Myers Mermel	5,227	18.21%
Write-in		489	1.70%
Total votes		28,710	100.0%

== Progressive primary ==
=== Candidates ===
==== Withdrew after winning primary ====
- Martha Abbott, former chair of the Vermont Progressive Party and candidate for governor in 1974

==== Declined ====
- Tanya Vyhovsky, state representative (running for state senate)

=== Results ===
Progressive primary results
Party	Candidate	Votes	%
Progressive	Martha Abbott	473	86.63%
Write-in		73	13.37%
Total votes		546	100.0%

== Minor-parties and independents ==
=== Candidates ===
==== Declared ====
- Mark Coester, truck driver
- Natasha Diamondstone-Kohout (Green Mountain)
- Stephen Duke
- Dawn Marie Ellis
- Cris Ericson, perennial candidate
- Kerry Patrick Raheb, former stockbroker

==== Declined ====
- Christopher Helali (Party of Communists USA), farmer and teacher
- Brock Pierce, cryptocurrency investor, former actor, and candidate for president of the United States in 2020

== General election ==
=== Predictions ===
Source	Ranking	As of
The Cook Political Report	Solid D	November 19, 2021
Inside Elections	Solid D	January 7, 2022
Sabato's Crystal Ball	Safe D	November 3, 2021
Politico	Solid D	August 12, 2022
RCP	Safe D	November 1, 2022
Fox News	Solid D	May 12, 2022
DDHQ	Solid D	July 20, 2022
538	Solid D	June 30, 2022
The Economist	Safe D	September 7, 2022

=== Post-primary endorsements ===
Peter Welch (D)

Statewide officials

- Beth Pearce, Vermont State Treasurer (2011–2023)

State legislators

- 10 state senators
- 22 state representatives

Local officials

- Kristine Lott, Mayor of Winooski (2019–present)

Newspapers

- Addison County Independent

Organizations

- Brady Campaign
- Everytown for Gun Safety
- Human Rights Campaign
- Indivisible Project
- Let America Vote
- National Education Association
- Natural Resources Defense Council
- Planned Parenthood Action Fund
- Rights and Democracy Vermont
- Sierra Club
- Vermont College Democrats
- Vermont State Employees Association
Gerald Malloy (R)

U.S. Executive Branch officials

- Donald Trump, 45th president of the United States (2017–2021)

Individuals

- Paul Hurley, Roman Catholic priest for the Archdiocese of Boston and former U.S. Army Chief of Chaplains
- Rich Staats, retired U.S. Army major general and former commanding general of the 75th Innovation Command

State legislators

- Mark Higley, state representative
- Larry Labor, state representative
- Art Peterson, state representative
- Vicki Strong, state representative

=== Polling ===
Poll source	Date(s) administered	Sample size	Margin of error	Peter Welch (D)	Gerald Malloy (R)	Other	Undecided
Data for Progress (D)	October 21–26, 2022	1,039 (LV)	± 3.0%	63%	32%	–	4%
University of New Hampshire	September 29 – October 3, 2022	765 (LV)	± 3.5%	62%	28%	2% (Note: Ericson (I) with 1%; Ellis (I) with 1%)	8%
The Trafalgar Group (R)	September 3–7, 2022	1,072 (LV)	± 2.9%	50%	43%	2%	5%

Hypothetical polling

Peter Welch vs. Christina Nolan

Poll source	Date(s) administered	Sample size	Margin of error	Peter Welch (D)	Christina Nolan (R)	Other	Undecided
University of New Hampshire	April 14–18, 2022	583 (LV)	± 4.1%	62%	27%	1%	10%

Patrick Leahy vs. Phil Scott

Poll source	Date(s) administered	Sample size	Margin of error	Patrick Leahy (D)	Phil Scott (R)	Other	Undecided
VPR/Vermont PBS	September 3–15, 2020	582 (LV)	± 4.0%	38%	41%	7%	15%

=== Debates ===
2022 United States Senate general election in Vermont debates
No.	Date	Host	Moderator	Link	Democratic	Republican
Key: P Participant A Absent N Non-invitee I Invitee W Withdrawn						
Key: P Participant A Absent N Non-invitee I Invitee W Withdrawn					Peter Welch	Gerard Malloy
1	Oct. 13, 2022	Vermont Public Radio	Mikaela Lefrak	Youtube	P	P

=== Results ===

2022 United States Senate election in Vermont
Party	Candidate	Votes	%	±%
Democratic	Peter Welch	196,575	68.47%	+7.21%
Republican	Gerald Malloy	80,468	28.03%	−5.00%
Independent	Dawn Marie Ellis	2,752	0.96%	N/A
Green Mountain	Natasha Diamondstone-Kohout	1,574	0.55%	N/A
Independent	Kerry Patrick Raheb	1,532	0.53%	N/A
Independent	Mark Coester	1,273	0.44%	N/A
Independent	Stephen Duke	1,209	0.42%	N/A
Independent	Cris Ericson	1,105	0.38%	N/A
Write-in		612	0.21%	+0.11%
Total votes		287,100	100%	N/A
Democratic hold				

==== By county ====
By county

County	Peter Welch Democratic		Gerald Malloy Republican		Various candidates Other parties	
County	#	%	#	%	#	%
Addison	12,720	70.33%	4,843	26.78%	522	2.89%
Bennington	10,075	63.33%	4,937	31.03%	896	5.64%
Caledonia	7,789	60.94%	4,544	35.55%	448	3.51%
Chittenden	58,534	76.65%	15,589	20.41%	2,238	2.94%
Essex	1,150	47.72%	1,156	47.97%	104	4.31%
Franklin	11,478	57.98%	7,712	38.96%	606	3.06%
Grand Isle	2,533	63.85%	1,341	33.8%	93	2.35%
Lamoille	8,259	71.5%	2,953	25.56%	339	2.94%
Orange	8,947	64.17%	4,501	32.28%	495	3.55%
Orleans	6,041	56.35%	4,293	40.05%	386	3.6%
Rutland	14,848	56.31%	10,718	40.64%	804	3.05%
Washington	20,676	73.54%	6,371	22.66%	1,067	3.8%
Windham	14,581	72.76%	4,248	21.2%	1,210	6.04%
Windsor	18,944	70.02%	7,262	26.84%	849	3.14%
Totals	196,575	68.47%	80,468	28.03%	10,057	3.5%

== See also ==
- 2022 United States Senate elections
