= Justin Brande =

American conservationist and farmer (1917–2000)

Justin Herbert Brande (1917–2000) was an American conservationist and a farmer. Brande was the son of noted writer Dorothea Brande. He led conservation efforts in Vermont to promote organic agriculture and protect natural resources that spanned several decades.

== Early life and education ==
Brande was born to Dorothea Brande and Herbert Brande in Chicago, Illinois on May 30, 1917. He graduated from the Morristown School (now Morristown-Beard School) in Morristown, New Jersey in 1935. During his studies at the school, Brande played for the ice hockey team.

As a junior, Brande played on the 1933-1934 Morristown School hockey team that went on an overseas tour of Europe; the team played games against Germany, France, and Switzerland. They received a personal message of good luck in a telegram from President Franklin Roosevelt. During Brande's senior year, his Morristown School hockey team won the 1935 championship title for the New Jersey Prep School Hockey League. They defeated Montclair Academy (now Montclair Kimberley Academy) by a score of 8-2 at Hobey Baker Memorial Rink at Princeton University in Princeton, New Jersey.

Brande completed his bachelor's degree in philosophy at Williams College in Williamstown, Massachusetts. He later earned a master's degree in resource economics from the University of Vermont in Burlington, Vermont in 1975. After his graduate studies, Brande taught at the university's environmental studies department until 1985.

== Leadership in conservation and organic agriculture ==
Brande helped start several organizations in Vermont to facilitate conservation and sustainable agriculture. In 1963, he co-founded the Vermont Natural Resources Council with Dick Brett, Jim Martin, and Perry Merrill. At the Council's first annual meeting, Brande took on the role of chair. After the Council formed a board of directors in 1965, he served as a board member; four years later, he served as the Council's first executive director. During the 1990s, Brande co-founded the Smallholders Association with Morris Earle to advocate for sustainable farms and businesses. He also organized a conservation commission in Cornwall, Vermont during the 1970s.

During the 1950s, Brande invited organic farming pioneer Lady Eve Balfour to speak at Middlebury Grange Hall in Middlebury, Vermont. He then organized regional conventions for organic farming that influenced the establishment of the Northeast Organic Farming Association. Brande later helped establish the Lake Champlain Committee, which supports protection of the lake and its surrounding region. During the 1960s, he then served as coordinator of the committee's activities. He also served as a member of the board of directors of the Otter Creek Audubon Society and as a delegate to the Addison County Regional Planning Commission. In 1998, the Otter Creek Audubon Society awarded him their Silver Feather Award for exceptional service to the community.

== Environmental legislation advocacy ==
During the 1960s, Brande led advocacy in support of passage of Vermont Act 250, the state's land use and development law. Vermont's state legislature passed the act into law in 1970. Describing Brande's efforts to promote its passage, Governor Deane C. Davis stated, "Although a staunch environmentalist, he came to problems open-minded until all the evidence was in. Then be took his stand. Justin got me started, and kept after me until Act 250 was signed into law."

During the 1970s and 1980s, Brande testified at multiple Congressional hearings on environmental issues. The U.S. Senate Committee on Agriculture, Nutrition, and Forestry and its subcommittees held the hearings on:

- 1975: Protection of the Bristol Cliffs wilderness area in Vermont
- 1979: Roadless Area Review and Evaluation II proposals
- 1983: Efficiency of federal programs serving rural areas

== Recognition and legacy ==
On June 27, 2000, U.S. Senator Patrick Leahy commemorated the legacy of Brande's conservation activities in Vermont on the floor of the U.S. Senate. Two years later, the Vermont Assembly in Montpelier, Vermont adopted a joint concurrent resolution (J.C.R.H 30) to honor his work. In 1999 and 2000, Middlebury College hosted the Justin Brande Symposium to discuss sustainability in energy and resource usage.

== Family ==
Brande married Susan (Kennedy) Brande, a graduate of Smith College, in Wonalancet, New Hampshire on October 9, 1948. They then moved to Vermont and purchased the family dairy farm in Cornwall in 1951. Brande and Susan Brande had eight children.
