= Liam Madden =

American veteran and anti-war activist

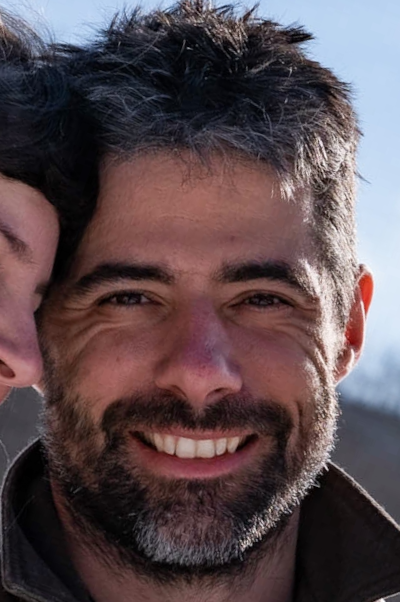

Personal details
- Born: 1983 or 1984 (age 42–43) Riverhead, New York, U.S.
- Party: Independent
- Other political affiliations: Republican (2022)
- Spouse: Lauren
- Children: 2
- Education: Central Texas College (AA); Northeastern University (BA)
- Occupation: Businessman; activist
- Website: Campaign website

Military service
- Allegiance: United States
- Branch/service: United States Marine Corps
- Years of service: 2003–2007
- Rank: Sergeant
- Unit: 31st Marine Expeditionary Unit
- Battles/wars: Iraq War

Liam Madden (born 1983/84) is an American Marine veteran, entrepreneur, and anti-war activist. Although a political independent, he was the Republican Party nominee in the 2022 United States House of Representatives election in Vermont. A critic of the two-party system, he stated that if elected, he would not caucus with House Republicans.

Madden served in the United States Marine Corps from 2003 to 2007. Shortly before leaving the military, he founded Appeal for Redress, a group of military personnel opposed to the Iraq War. He then served as a leader of Iraq Veterans Against the War, including chair of the board of directors.

== Early life ==
In 1989, when he was four years old, Madden's family moved to Stowe, Vermont. In 1996, they moved to Bellows Falls, Vermont.

== Military service ==
Madden served in the Marine Corps Communications Electronics Specialist from January 2003 to January 2007 and attained the rank of Sergeant. During this time, he deployed to Kuwait, Thailand, Okinawa, Japan, and Korea, and spent seven months in Iraq.

After the end of his term of service, but while still a member of the Individual Ready Reserve, Madden was investigated by the Marines for his anti-war activities. He was charged with making disloyal statements and with wearing his uniform at a political event, and he was threatened with having his honorable discharge status revised to "Other Than Honorable", which would prevent him from receiving benefits. The Marine Corps dropped its case.

== Anti-war activism ==
=== Appeal for Redress ===
While still in the military, Madden worked with sailor Jonathan Wesley Hutto to write and begin circulation of the Appeal for Redress, taking advantage of a legal right for U.S. military personnel to petition their Congressional representatives. The Appeal, which had been signed by over 2000 active-duty military personnel as of January, 2008, states:

As a patriotic American proud to serve the nation in uniform, I respectfully urge my political leaders in Congress to support the prompt withdrawal of all American military forces and bases from Iraq. Staying in Iraq will not work and is not worth the price. It is time for U.S. troops to come home.

The Appeal attracted media coverage from 60 Minutes, NPR, the New York Times, the Washington Post, Los Angeles Times, the San Francisco Chronicle, The Nation, and the Army Times, among others.

Madden's leadership and activism against the Iraq war was praised by Vermont's U.S. senator Patrick Leahy:

Sgt. Madden is an American patriot. I wish officials in the White House and the Pentagon who got us into this fiasco had a fraction of his honesty and courage.

== Business career ==
Madden was co-founder of Green Gas Movement, a greentech start-up that won the 2018 MIT Solve contest. He currently works as Director of Solar Energy at a Vermont-based home energy company.

== 2022 U.S. House of Representatives campaign ==
Madden, an independent and critic of the two-party system, ran in the Republican primary. His victory was considered an upset.

The Vermont Republican Party state committee disavowed Madden's campaign following a meeting with him on August 15, less than a week after his victory in the primary, citing his refusal to commit to caucusing with the Republican Party if he won the election. He would ultimately lose the general election to Becca Balint.

2022 Vermont's at-large congressional district Republican primary
Party	Candidate	Votes	%
Republican	Liam Madden	10,688	41.4
Republican	Ericka Bundy Redic	8,229	31.9
Republican	Anya Tynio	6,902	26.7
Total votes		25,819	100.0

2022 Vermont's at-large congressional district election
Party	Candidate	Votes	%	±%
Democratic	Becca Balint	176,494	60.45%	–6.86%
Republican	Liam Madden	78,297	26.85%	–0.16%
Libertarian	Ericka Redic	12,590	4.31%	N/A
Independent	Matt Druzba	5,737	1.97%	N/A
Independent	Luke Talbot	4,428	1.52%	N/A
Independent	Adam Ortiz	3,376	1.16%	N/A
Write-in		1,004	0.34%	+0.19%
Total votes		291,955	100.00%	

== Political positions ==
=== Democracy reform ===
Madden is a critic of the two-party system and regards "fixing the government" his "top priority". To achieve a more democratic, accountable and responsive government he proposes the introduction of term limits, ranked choice voting, and national ballot initiatives. Madden calls for public funding of electoral campaigns, stating that "[w]inning an election under the current system requires hundreds of thousands of dollars. This excludes most working class people from participating, and gives inherent advantage to the kinds of representatives with access to, and perhaps disproportionate sympathies for the economically elite." He also advocates for using technology to "bypass politicians" as much as possible and create a direct democracy.

=== Economy and finance ===
Madden supports raising taxes for billionaires and large corporations to "invest this revenue into regenerative agriculture, sustainable infrastructure, healthcare, family leave, and education." He proposes the introduction of a wealth tax: "Taxing wealth and not simply income is the only way to prevent the accelerating concentration of power that threatens democracy." While sympathizing with the idea of Universal Basic Income (UBI) as put forth by Andrew Yang, Madden favors "universal public services": "Much of the same benefits of a UBI can be achieved via a federal work guarantee, federally funded (and locally controlled) health clinics, federal funding for 0% home loans and public transportation." Madden calls for the creation of a large "public service corps" to guarantee employment and "to build needed public infrastructure like public transportation, housing, education, healthcare, and regenerative agricultural resources". He supports worker cooperatives: "I would like to see a massive tax incentive, and other public subsidies for businesses offering meaningful avenues for employee ownership. And disincentives for companies that offer no such pathways." Madden is a proponent of the Modern Monetary Theory.

=== Infrastructure ===
Madden favors public transportation and wants it to be the "backbone of our infrastructure and transportation needs." He calls for "a trillion-dollar public transportation infrastructure and smart development, meaning creating housing and business land use patterns that are inherently more efficient."

== Awards ==
In 2007 Madden received the Institute for Policy Studies' Letelier-Moffitt Human Rights Award.

== Personal life ==
As of 2022, Madden lives in Bellows Falls. He and his wife, Lauren, have two children.

== See also ==
- Adam Kokesh, Marine who faced a similar discharge hearing
