= Susan Hatch Davis =

American politician

Member of the Vermont House of Representatives
- In office January 2007 – January 2017

Personal details
- Born: January 13, 1953 (age 73) Barre, Vermont, U.S.
- Party: Progressive
- Other political affiliations: Democratic

Susan Hatch Davis (born January 13, 1953) is an American politician from Vermont. A member of the Vermont Progressive Party, she was a candidate in the 2022 Vermont gubernatorial election. before withdrawing from the race. The Progressive Party ended up endorsing Brenda Siegel, a Democrat who would ultimately lose the race to Phil Scott

In 2016, Davis was endorsed by Bernie Sanders. In 2020, Davis entered a primary election against Mark MacDonald, but ultimately pulled out of the race and endorsed MacDonald.

Davis represented Orange-1 District in the Vermont House of Representatives from 2007 to 2017. She lives in Washington, Vermont.

Party political offices
Preceded by David Zuckerman	Progressive nominee for Governor of Vermont; 2022	Succeeded by Brenda Siegel
