= Appeal for Courage =

Appeal For Courage is an appeal by United States military personnel in favor of the Iraq War to the United States Congress.

The group is independent and non-partisan, but supported by Families United for Our Troops and their Mission, Vets for Freedom, and Military Families Voice of Victory. It was established in February 2007 largely as a response to the Appeal for Redress.

The group solicits members of the U.S. military to support an appeal to the U.S. Congress:

As an American currently serving my nation in uniform, I respectfully urge my political leaders in Congress to fully support our mission in Iraq and halt any calls for retreat. I also respectfully urge my political leaders to actively oppose media efforts which embolden my enemy while demoralizing American support at home. The War in Iraq is a necessary and just effort to bring freedom to the Middle East and protect America from further attack.

The appeal with over 2700 names was delivered by Bob Wallace, executive director of Veterans of Foreign Wars, to Congressman John Boehner, Senator Lindsey Graham, and five other members of Congress on May 9, 2007.
