= Farm & Wilderness =

Camp system in Vermont

Coordinates: 43°34′15″N 72°45′21″W

Farm and Wilderness
- Interactive map of Farm and Wilderness
- Location: 401 Farm and Wilderness Road, Plymouth, VT, 05056
- Established: 1939
- Slogan: Joyful Play. Purposeful Work. Rugged Outdoor Living.
- Website: https://www.farmandwilderness.org/

Farm & Wilderness, also known as F&W, is a system of six ACA-accredited summer camps and programs for children and teens aged 4-17 situated in and around Plymouth, Vermont. F&W's organizational philosophy draws inspiration from Quaker values and incorporates social justice and environmental sustainability into its programming. Four camps are located on the Woodward Reservoir, and two are located on the Nineveh lake.

== History ==
F&W was founded by Kenneth and Susan Howard Webb in 1939. The Webbs were influenced by Vermont philosopher and educational reformer, John Dewey.

A boys' camp was originally founded in 1939 under the name Mehrlicht, meaning “more light” in German. The name was later changed to Timberlake. A companion girls' camp, Indian Brook, was founded in 1941. Later additions to F&W were Tamarack Farm (an all-gender work camp for 15- to 17-year-olds), Saltash Mountain (co-ed, focused on hiking trips), Flying Cloud (for 11- to 14-year-old boys, originally borrowing the traditions of the Lakota people but later creating their own system of wilderness living in the manner of cultures from around the world; originally called “Indian Encampment”), and Barn Day Camp (for 4- to 10-year-old children). Indian Brook has been renamed Firefly Song. Flying Cloud was paused beginning in 2024 to reimagine its program. In the fall of 2025, Flying Cloud was officially closed and the co-ed camp "The Clearing" was introduced in 2026, for ages 11- to 14-year-old.

A further program, called “Questers”, consisted of session-long backpacking trips. The program was based from Saltash Mountain. Questers has hiked the entire Long Trail over both camp sessions, which spans from the southern to northern tip of Vermont. Half-summer Questers expeditions have involved both canoeing and backpacking, as well as rock climbing and white water rafting. As of 2025, the Questers program has also been paused, with no signs of returning to activity.

After retiring, Susan Webb served in the Vermont State Legislature from 1973 to 1980.

== Philosophy ==
F&W prides itself for its stances on a number of social issues, including racial integration, gender equality, and environmentalism. All F&W camps practice organic gardening and farming, and are certified by the Northeast Organic Farming Association. All the camps have composting toilets, nicknamed "kybos” (a common joke is kybo standing for Keep Your Bowels Open).

F&W camps all follow after Quaker values, though the camps are not religious. The six SPICES are taught to campers in all camps: Simplicity, Peace, Integrity, Community, Equality, and Sustainability. Other policies, like no body talk and following LNT, define F&W as different camps then others. No body talk means that campers and staff alike are not allowed to talk about other people's bodies, at all. You cannot call people skinny and beautiful as much as you cannot call someone ugly and fat. These are usually radical ideas in a society based on beauty standards, but campers have been shown to enjoy the policy. One camper explained, "I've never felt better about my body after my 3 weeks at TF. I feel better in my own skin and about my personality than ever."

=== Naturism ===
The Webbs were naturists, so the camps were originally “clothing optional”. By the late 1980s, nudity was only allowed at the waterfront for swimming. With further social changes and seeking cultural inclusion of those whose religion would not allow it, nudity was banned in 2009.

At Camp Flying Cloud in the 1960s, nudity was more frequent, the campers and counselors otherwise wearing “Indian” breech cloths of their own making. The Flying Cloud program has since moved away from what has been described as cultural appropriation of Native Americans.

In a memoir, journalist and podcaster Mark Oppenheimer recounts his experience at Timberlake, the boy's camp, in 1982, when he was eight. The most memorable aspect was nudity, which he found generally positive. While campers were clothed most of the time, swimming in the lake and outdoor showering were always nude, and clothes were not worn when walking from the cabins to these activities. Tamarack Farm, the coed camp, was also clothing optional at that time.

== Living ==
Five of the six camps are sleep-away: Firefly Song, Timberlake, Saltash Mountain (SAM), The Clearing, and Tamarack Farm. The Barn Day Camp (BDC) is an aptly named day camp.

=== Daily Life in Sleep-Away Camps ===
Campers and staff live in three-sided, open air cabins in the woods. In the sleep-away camps, campers may or may not live in cabins with staff. For Firefly Song, Timberlake, SAM, and The Clearing, counselors live in cabins for safety and supervision.. In Tamarack Farm, camper autonomy is greatly recognized. Staff live in cabins very nearby. A metal bell is rung at 7:00, 7:15, and 7:30, the last signaling circle-up before breakfast. Meals start, always, with a full camper and staff circle, where all hold hands. A grace, in the form of a short song that can be either silly or sweet, is sung. Hands are washed and meals, usually family style for breakfast and dinner and buffet for lunch, are served.

After breakfast, a silent meeting takes place. Silent meetings are about 15 minutes long of complete silence and no communication between campers. It is a time for reflection. Silent meetings are held in silent meeting circles, which are in the woods and have benches made of simple planks. Following that is camp specific activities, lunch, and rest hour. Then, afternoon activities are held, which range from plant identification to parachute-cord bracelets to ultimate frisbee on the lawn. Swimming happens after this. Dinner follows, then evening programming, then bed around 9:30.

=== Daily Life in the Barn Day Camp ===
Campers are provided with a cubby to store their backpack, lunchbox, a change of clothes, and projects they want to bring home from camp. Campers bring their own lunch and are provided snacks, which often include ingredients from the farms. Barn Day Campers are a part of age-based groups of 10-12 campers, with 2-3 counselors for each group.

In the mornings, campers and counselors sing songs. Campers then explore the outdoors, encouraged to focus on sights and sounds as they explore the variety of insects and plants. Campers also care for the farm animals and tend to the garden. Small camp projects offer the opportunity to build something substantial to contribute. There are also morning swim lessons and splashing around at the waterfront.

Afternoons include silent meeting and a variety of afternoon activities. After singing and final circle, the campers leave.
