= Becca Balint =

American politician (born 1968)

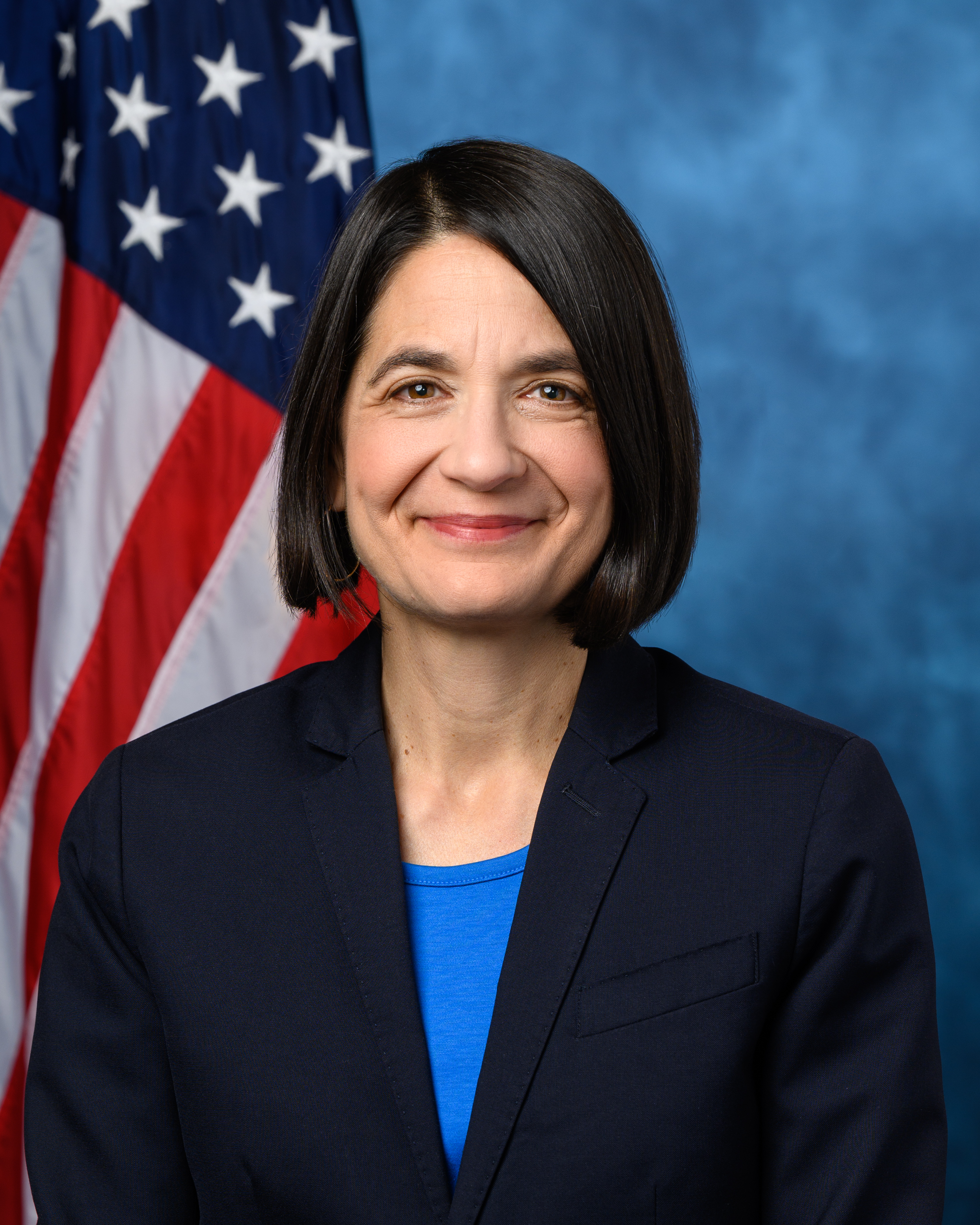
- Official portrait, 2023

Member of the U.S. House of Representatives from Vermont's at-large district
- Incumbent
- Assumed office January 3, 2023
- Preceded by: Peter Welch

President pro tempore of the Vermont Senate
- In office January 6, 2021 – January 3, 2023
- Preceded by: Tim Ashe
- Succeeded by: Philip Baruth

Majority Leader of the Vermont Senate
- In office January 6, 2017 – January 6, 2021
- Preceded by: Philip Baruth
- Succeeded by: Alison H. Clarkson

Member of the Vermont Senate from the Windham district
- In office January 7, 2015 – January 3, 2023 Serving with Jeanette White
- Preceded by: Peter Galbraith
- Succeeded by: Wendy Harrison; Nader Hashim

Personal details
- Born: May 4, 1968 (age 58) Heidelberg, West Germany
- Party: Democratic
- Spouse: Elizabeth Wohl (m. 2009)
- Children: 2
- Education: Barnard College (attended); Smith College (BA); Harvard University (MEd); University of Massachusetts, Amherst (MA)
- Website: House website Campaign website

Rebecca A. Balint (/ˈbælɪnt/ BAL-int; born May 4, 1968) is an American politician who is a member of the United States House of Representatives from Vermont's at-large congressional district as a member of the Democratic Party. She served as a member of the Vermont Senate from Windham County from 2015 to 2023, as majority leader from 2017 to 2021, and as president pro tempore from 2021 to 2023.

Balint was born in Heidelberg, West Germany, and raised in Peekskill, New York. She was educated at Walter Panas High School, Smith College, Harvard University, and the University of Massachusetts Amherst. She moved to Vermont in 1994 where she was active in local politics, and worked as a teacher, rock-climbing instructor, and columnist for the Brattleboro Reformer. Balint was elected to the State Senate in 2014, becoming the first openly acknowledged lesbian to serve there. She was selected to serve as majority leader and later elected president pro tempore, the first woman and openly LGBTQ person to do so in Vermont.

Balint was elected to the U.S. House in the 2022 election. She is the first woman and openly LGBTQ person to represent Vermont in Congress. Prior to her election, Vermont was the only state that had not previously elected a woman to Congress.

== Early life and education ==
Rebecca A. Balint was born at the United States Army hospital in Heidelberg, West Germany, on May 4, 1968, the daughter of Peter and Sandra (Couchman) Balint, and raised in Peekskill, New York. Her grandfather was murdered on a death march from the Mauthausen concentration camp during the Holocaust; her Hungarian-Jewish father immigrated to the U.S. in 1957. She graduated from Walter Panas High School in 1986. In the sixth grade, she admitted to having a crush on a female classmate, for which other students taunted her, including writing "lezzie" on her locker; she came out to her friends after high school and to her parents while she was in college. Balint became interested in politics at an early age, which she later attributed to having been raised in a family affected by the Holocaust and observing how government actions affect women and minorities, including gays and lesbians.

Balint attended Barnard College of Columbia University before transferring to Smith College. She graduated magna cum laude from Smith with a Bachelor of Arts in history and women's studies in 1990, received a Master of Education from Harvard University in 1995, and completed a Master of Arts in history from the University of Massachusetts Amherst in 2000. At Smith College, Balint was coxswain for the women's crew team, who nicknamed her "the Admiral" because of her leadership skills.

Balint moved to Vermont in 1994, and taught middle school history and social studies and worked as a rock-climbing instructor at Farm & Wilderness summer camps in Plymouth, Vermont, in addition to teaching at the Community College of Vermont in Brattleboro and writing a column for the Brattleboro Reformer. She met Elizabeth Wohl in 2000; they formed a civil union in 2004, moved to Brattleboro in 2007, and got married in 2009, after same-sex marriage was legalized in Vermont. They have two children.

Balint supported the Vermont Progressive Party in the 2000s, and supported their gubernatorial nominee, Anthony Pollina, in the 2000 election. She served as a town meeting representative and on the Development Review Board in Brattleboro.

== Vermont Senate ==
=== Elections ===
In 2014, Balint announced her campaign for a Vermont Senate seat from the two-member Windham district. She raised the most money in the race, around $13,000, with donations from people such as Jane Lynch, and was endorsed by Majority Leader Philip Baruth. Windham County Democratic Party chair Brandon Batham served as her campaign manager; he later served as a member of the city council in Barre and operations manager for the Vermont Democratic Party before being accused of embezzling party funds.

With one incumbent, Democrat Peter Galbraith, not running for reelection, Balint and the other incumbent, Jeanette White, won the Democratic nominations and Balint won a seat by placing second in the 2014 general election, ahead of an independent and two Liberty Union candidates. Her election made her the first out lesbian to serve in the state senate. She was reelected in 2016, 2018, and 2020 against independent, Liberty Union, and Republican candidates.

=== Tenure ===
In 2017, the State Senate voted 20 to 10, with Balint in favor, to suspend Senator Norman H. McAllister following accusations of sexual assault, his arrest in May 2015, in the Vermont State House, and a criminal trial against him. Balint served as the chair of the Senate Sexual Harassment Panel. She also served on the Economic Development, Housing and General Affairs, Finance, and Rules Committees. The Democratic caucus unanimously voted to make Balint majority leader in 2017. In 2020, the Democratic caucus selected her to succeed Tim Ashe as president pro tempore of the Vermont Senate, and she became the first woman and openly LGBT person to serve in the role.

During the 2016 election she was a member of the Victory Leaders Councils formed by the Democratic National Committee. During the 2020 Democratic presidential primaries she and other members of the Vermont General Assembly declined to endorse any candidate for president.

== U.S. House of Representatives ==
=== Elections ===
==== 2022 ====
Balint's congressional campaign logo

On November 15, 2021, Senator Patrick Leahy announced that he would not seek reelection to the United States Senate in 2022. Peter Welch, the member of the United States House of Representatives from Vermont's at-large congressional district, announced that he would run to replace Leahy.

On December 13, Balint announced that she would seek the Democratic nomination to succeed Welch in the 2022 election. Balint selected Natalie Silver, Welch's former communications director, to manage her campaign. She raised over $125,000 within 24 hours of her announcement. Balint said she would follow Bernie Sanders's example by not accepting campaign contributions from corporate political action committees, but accepting political action committee donations from labor unions. She won the Democratic nomination and defeated Republican nominee Liam Madden in the general election.

The Campaign Legal Center stated that her campaign website was using red-boxing, a practice that allows a campaign to coordinate with super PACs. During the primary, the LGBTQ Victory Fund spent around $1 million on Balint's behalf, with most of it coming from a $1.1 million donation from FTX executive Nishad Singh. Sam Bankman-Fried donated $26,100 to Balint. When Bankman-Fried and Singh were later accused of crimes related to their operation of FTX and political contributions, Balint's staff said that she was cooperating with federal authorities and would follow their guidance with respect to the contributions.

==== 2024 ====
Balint announced that she would seek reelection on March 27, 2024. She won the election with 62.29% of the vote.

=== Tenure ===
In 2023, Balint was listed as one of one hundred most impactful and influential LGBTQ+ People by Out.

Balint was appointed to the Committee on Oversight and Accountability and Committee on the Budget upon taking office. She was selected to replace David Cicilline on the United States House Committee on the Judiciary in June 2023, after his resignation.

=== Committee assignments ===
- Committee on the Budget
- Committee on the Judiciary
  - Subcommittee on the Administrative State, Regulatory Reform, and Antitrust
  - Subcommittee on the Constitution and Limited Government

=== Caucus memberships ===
- Black Maternal Health Caucus
- Congressional Progressive Caucus
- Congressional Equality Caucus (Co-Chair)
- Congressional Caucus for the Equal Rights Amendment
- House Baltic Caucus
- Congressional Freethought Caucus

== Political positions ==
Balint has been described as a progressive.

In 2017, Balint sponsored legislation to limit police involvement with immigration enforcement by the federal government, opposing President Donald Trump's support for a federal registry on religious and immigration status. She voted to expand background checks on gun sales in 2018. The Vermont Conservation Voters gave her a lifetime score of 100%.

Balint opposes voter identification on the grounds that voter fraud is extremely rare and that voter ID laws are used to restrict people from voting. She supported legislation that sent all voters mail-in ballots and said that it was a part of Vermont's legacy of making voting easier. She sponsored legislation to implement ranked-choice voting for presidential and congressional elections in Vermont.

In 2021, Balint and Speaker Jill Krowinski gave an apology for Vermont's involvement in eugenics, including legislation from 1931 that supported a eugenics study conducted by Henry Farnham Perkins. In 2021, an amendment to the Constitution of Vermont to codify Roe v. Wade passed in the state senate, 26 to 4, with Balint in favor.

In 2016, Balint opposed legislation to legalize marijuana despite her support for legalization, saying that she "believed this bill does not leave room for the home-grown and the small growers who would like to be a part of this new economy." She initially voted against marijuana legalization in a 16 to 13 vote in 2017, but became the only member in the state senate to change her vote after an amendment by Senator John S. Rodgers reduced the cultivation application fee that ranged from $15,000 — $25,000 down to $3,000 — $7,500.

=== LGBTQ rights ===
Balint supported legislation to prohibit conversion therapy on minors. She supported legislation banning the gay panic defense, which passed unanimously in the state senate, but was unable to vote for it because she was presiding in place of Lieutenant Governor Molly Gray. In 2024, Balint wrote an opinion column on MSNBC criticizing Speaker Mike Johnson and congressional Republicans for banning incoming Representative Sarah McBride, the first openly transgender member of Congress, from using women's or gender-neutral restrooms in the Capitol.

=== Foreign policy ===
In 2023, Balint was among 56 Democrats to vote in favor of H.Con.Res. 21, which directed President Joe Biden to remove U.S. troops from Syria within 180 days.

==== Israel and Palestine ====
Following the 2023 Hamas attack on Israel, Balint initially supported continued military aid to Israel stating that "Israel is literally surrounded by countries that want to destroy it, and it's smaller than the size of Vermont. Imagine Vermont surrounded on all sides by enemies .... So, it has to have that aid to defend itself. It's in the midst of an existential threat." In the same month, Balint proposed a resolution to censure Marjorie Taylor Greene and was critical of Greene's censure resolution against Rashida Tlaib.

On November 16, she became the 32nd member of Congress and the first Jewish congressperson to call for a ceasefire in the Gaza war. In April 2024, Balint stated that "The United States cannot continue to support the extreme offensive that has caused unimaginable suffering to the Palestinian people" and that "supporting Netanyahu's war in Gaza will undermine Israel's long-term security and standing". Balint supported blocking the sale of offensive weapons to Israel. In May 2025, Balint became an original co-sponsor of the Block the Bombs Act, which would halt military aid to Israel.

In June 2024, Balint voted against legislation using the International Holocaust Remembrance Alliance's definition of antisemitism which equates anti-Zionism with antisemitism.

In July, Balint boycotted Israeli Prime Minister Benjamin Netanyahu's speech to Congress and said he has led "the most extremist government that Israel has ever seen." Balint has called Israel's actions in Gaza a genocide.

== Electoral history ==
2014 Vermont Senate Windham district election
Primary election
Party	Candidate	Votes	%
Democratic	Jeanette White (incumbent)	2,260	40.06%
Democratic	Becca Balint	1,684	29.85%
Democratic	Roger Allbee	1,240	21.98%
Democratic	Joan Bowman	446	7.91%
Write-in		11	0.20%
Total votes		5,641	100.00%
	Blank and spoiled	990	
General election
Democratic	Jeanette White (incumbent)	7,777	43.44%
Democratic	Becca Balint	6,378	35.63%
Independent	Mary Hasson	1,973	11.02%
Liberty Union	Jerry Levy	899	5.02%
Liberty Union	Aaron Diamondstone	833	4.65%
Write-in		41	0.23%
Total votes		17,901	100.00%
	Blank and spoiled	1,606	

2016 Vermont Senate Windham district election
Primary election
Party	Candidate	Votes	%
Democratic	Jeanette White (incumbent)	4,348	50.43%
Democratic	Becca Balint (incumbent)	4,215	48.89%
Write-in		59	0.68%
Total votes		8,622	100.00%
	Blank and spoiled	3,292	
General election
Democratic	Jeanette White (incumbent)	11,451	36.61%
Democratic	Becca Balint (incumbent)	11,174	35.72%
Independent	David Schoales	5,610	17.94%
Liberty Union	Jerry Levy	1,529	4.89%
Liberty Union	Aaron Diamondstone	1,437	4.59%
Write-in		78	0.25%
Total votes		31,279	100.00%
	Blank and spoiled	10,589	

2018 Vermont Senate Windham district election
Primary election
Party	Candidate	Votes	%
Democratic	Jeanette White (incumbent)	4,697	46.47%
Democratic	Becca Balint (incumbent)	4,308	42.62%
Democratic	Wayne Vernon Estey	1,076	10.65%
Write-in		26	0.26%
Total votes		10,107	100.00%
	Blank and spoiled	2,313	
General election
Democratic	Becca Balint (incumbent)	11,464	39.39%
Democratic	Jeanette White (incumbent)	10,644	36.58%
Republican	Tyler Colford	3,861	13.27%
Independent	Beverly Stone	1,675	5.76%
Liberty Union	Aaron Diamondstone	763	2.62%
Liberty Union	Jerry Levy	659	2.26%
Write-in		35	0.12%
Total votes		29,101	100.00%
	Blank and spoiled	6,287	

2020 Vermont Senate Windham district election
Primary election
Party	Candidate	Votes	%
Democratic	Becca Balint (incumbent)	7,001	51.50%
Democratic	Jeanette White (incumbent)	6,519	47.95%
Write-in		74	0.54%
Total votes		13,594	100.00%
	Blank and spoiled	3,446	
General election
Democratic	Becca Balint (incumbent)	14,520	37.80%
Democratic	Jeanette White (incumbent)	13,683	35.62%
Republican	Marcus R. Parish	4,359	11.35%
Republican	John Lyddy	4,265	11.10%
Independent	Tyler Colford	1,499	3.90%
Write-in		87	0.23%
Total votes		38,413	100.00%
	Blank and spoiled	9,551	

2022 Vermont's at-large congressional district Democratic primary
Party	Candidate	Votes	%
Democratic	Becca Balint	61,025	60.47%
Democratic	Molly Gray	37,266	36.93%
Democratic	Louis Meyers	1,593	1.58%
Democratic	Sianay Chase Clifford (withdrawn)	885	0.88%
Write-in		145	0.14%
Total votes		100,914	100.0%

2022 Vermont's at-large congressional district election
Party	Candidate	Votes	%	±%
Democratic	Becca Balint	176,494	60.45%	–6.86%
Republican	Liam Madden	78,297	26.85%	–0.16%
Libertarian	Ericka Redic	12,590	4.31%	N/A
Independent	Matt Druzba	5,737	1.97%	N/A
Independent	Luke Talbot	4,428	1.52%	N/A
Independent	Adam Ortiz	3,376	1.16%	N/A
Write-in		1,004	0.34%	+0.19%
Total votes		291,955	100.00%	
Democratic hold				

2024 Vermont's at-large congressional district Democratic primary
Party	Candidate	Votes	%
Democratic	Becca Balint (incumbent)	47,638	99.03%
Write-in		465	0.97%
Total votes		48,103	100.00%

2024 Vermont's at-large congressional district election
Party	Candidate	Votes	%	±%
Democratic	Becca Balint (incumbent)	218,398	62.29%	+1.84
Republican	Mark Coester	104,451	29.79%	–2.94
Independent	Adam Ortiz	19,286	5.50%	+4.34
Green Mountain Peace and Justice	Jessy Diamondstone	7,552	2.15%	N/A
Write-in		929	0.25%	–0.09
Total votes		350,616	100.0%	
Democratic hold				

== See also ==
- List of first openly LGBT politicians in the United States
- List of Jewish members of the United States Congress
- List of LGBT members of the United States Congress

Vermont Senate
Preceded by Philip Baruth	Majority Leader of the Vermont Senate; 2017–2021	Succeeded by Alison H. Clarkson
Preceded by Tim Ashe	President pro tempore of the Vermont Senate; 2021–2023	Succeeded by Philip Baruth
U.S. House of Representatives
Preceded by Peter Welch	Member of the U.S. House of Representatives from Vermont's at-large congressional district 2023–present	Incumbent
U.S. order of precedence (ceremonial)
Preceded by Mark Alford	United States representatives by seniority 292nd	Succeeded by Aaron Bean
