= The Natural Farmer =

- Staff writers: Jack Kittredge
- Frequency: Quarterly
- Publisher: Northeast Organic Farming Association (NOFA)
- Country: United States
- Based in: Barre, Massachusetts
- Website: The Natural Farmer
- ISSN: 1077-2294
- OCLC: 9569335

The Natural Farmer is a magazine publication based in the Northeastern United States that covers agricultural topics for farmers. The magazine is owned by Northeast Organic Farming Association and is headquartered in Barre, Massachusetts. In 1988 Jack Kittredge became the editor of the magazine.
