= Christine Hallquist =

American politician

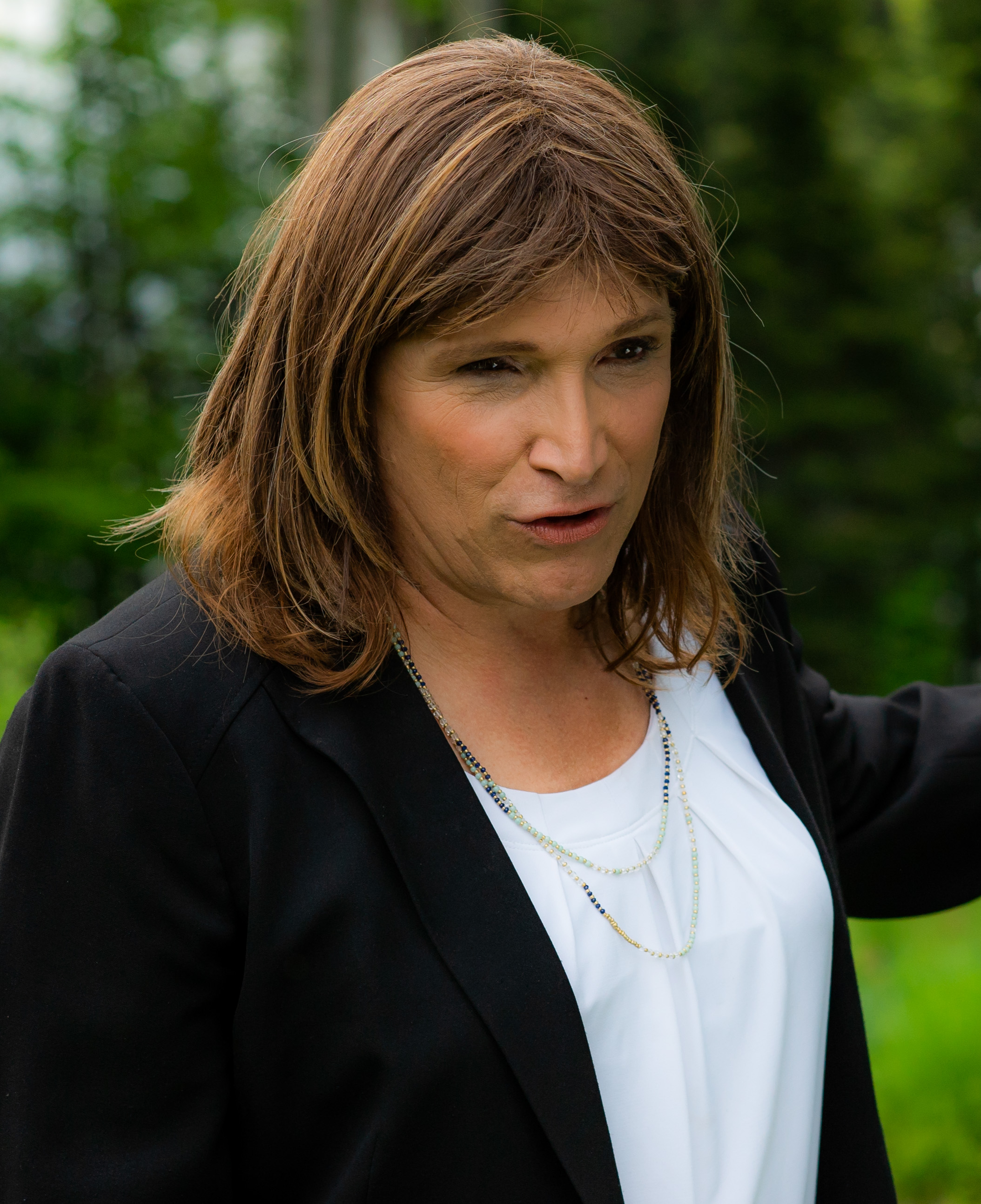

Personal details
- Born: April 11, 1956 (age 70) Baldwinsville, New York, U.S.
- Party: Democratic
- Spouse: Patricia (m. 1984)
- Children: 3
- Education: Mohawk Valley Community College (AS); University of Massachusetts, Amherst (attended)
- Website: Campaign website

Christine Hallquist (born April 11, 1956) is an American politician and former CEO of the Vermont Electric Cooperative (VEC). She is the first openly transgender major-party nominee for governor in the United States, winning the 2018 Democratic nomination for governor of Vermont with over 40% of the vote. Hallquist worked at VEC from 1998 to 2018, the last 13 years as CEO, until she resigned to run for governor. Drawing national attention as a pioneering example of a CEO transitioning while in office, her transition was documented by her son in a documentary, Denial.

== Early life and education ==
Hallquist grew up in Baldwinsville, New York as one of seven children and later attended Catholic elementary school. She had a difficult time in school and in the 8th grade, a school official called her parents to say that she needed an exorcism. Her parents immediately disagreed with school officials and pulled her out of the school. She attended public high school and later the Mohawk Valley Community College in Utica, New York. At the age of 20, Hallquist moved to Vermont. She started as an engineer at IBM and then enrolled in a training program at the University of Massachusetts to become an electrical engineer.

== Career ==
After beginning her professional life at IBM, Hallquist took a job at Digital Equipment Corporation. There she joined a training program at the University of Massachusetts to become an electrical engineer and worked with Digital to create low-cost power supplies quickly using lean manufacturing. Hallquist accepted an early buyout from Digital and moved back to Vermont to become the CEO of a small electronics company in Barre, Vermont, then founded a consulting firm that worked with such companies as Xerox, Miller Beer, and Honda. She started at VEC as engineering and operations manager in 2000, shortly after its recovery from bankruptcy.

In July 2021 Governor Phil Scott appointed her as executive director of the newly-established Vermont Community Broadband Board (VCBB).

== Gubernatorial campaign ==
Hallquist announced her 2018 gubernatorial campaign in Morrisville, Vermont on April 8, and said, "I truly believe Vermont is ready to elect a transgender governor because I don't think Vermonters are going to look at that." Hallquist ran on a platform of increased broadband access, universal Medicare and aggressive action against climate change.

In an August 22, 2018 interview with the Associated Press, Hallquist reported she had been getting death threats and personal attacks from all over the United States and around the world. The threats caused Hallquist to alter campaign appearances and decide not to publicize the address of her Morrisville campaign headquarters. On September 17, 2018, Politico rated the race as "Lean Republican", one step away from a tossup. On November 6, 2018, Hallquist lost the election to Republican candidate and incumbent Phil Scott.

== Personal life ==
Hallquist lives in Hyde Park, Vermont, with her wife, Pat. They have three adult children and two grandchildren. She confided to her wife that she was transgender early in their marriage and opened up to her children in the 2000s. She publicly transitioned in 2015. Although her mother accepted the transition, Hallquist's relationship with some of her friends and siblings deteriorated. Hallquist later commented that the transition was much easier than expected and that her relationship with her wife and children remains strong.

In April 2020, Hallquist tested positive for COVID-19.

Party political offices
Preceded by Sue Minter	Democratic nominee for Governor of Vermont; 2018	Succeeded by David Zuckerman
