= Appeal for Redress =

Appeal For Redress is a group of United States military personnel opposed to the Iraq War. The group is sponsored by Iraq Veterans Against the War (IVAW), Military Families Speak Out, and Veterans for Peace (VFP). The group solicits members of the U.S. military to communicate the following message to the U.S. Congress:

As a patriotic American proud to serve the nation in uniform, I respectfully urge my political leaders in Congress to support the prompt withdrawal of all American military forces and bases from Iraq. Staying in Iraq will not work and is not worth the price. It is time for U.S. troops to come home.

On January 16, 2007 members of the campaign delivered more than 1000 signatures to Congress, accompanied by Congressman Dennis Kucinich.

On February 23, 2007, the group was featured on the CBS Evening News with Katie Couric. It was later featured on 60 Minutes.

== Appeal for Redress V2 (2024) ==
A second "appeal for redress" campaign was launched in June 2024 to enable US military personnel who are opposed to US support of Israeli actions in Gaza to share their views with their members of Congress. This second campaign was sponsored by Veterans for Peace, the Center on Conscience and War, About Face: Veterans Against the War and the Military Law Task Force of the National Lawyers Guild.

== See also ==
- Appeal for Courage - a group of military set up in favor of the war.
