= 2020 United States House of Representatives election in Vermont =

2020 United States House of Representatives election in Vermont's at-large district
- November 3, 2020
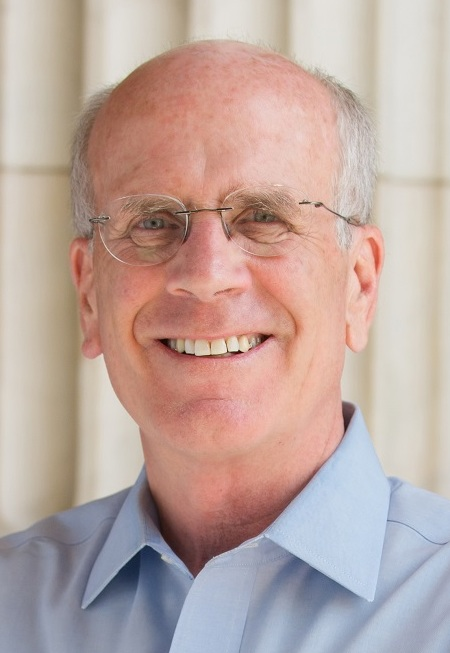

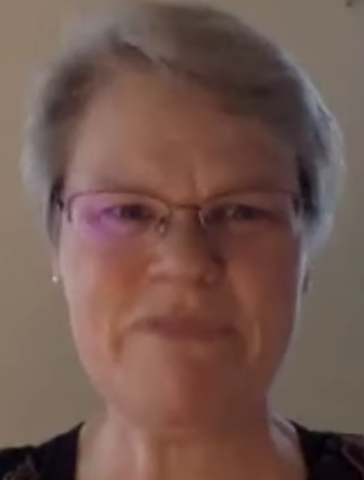
Nominee	Peter Welch	Miriam Berry
Party	Democratic	Republican
Popular vote	238,827	95,830
Percentage	67.31%	27.01%
- Welch: 40–50% 50–60% 60–70% 70–80% 80–90% >90% Berry: 40–50% 50–60% Tie: 40–50% No votes
U.S. Representative before election
Peter Welch
Democratic
Elected U.S. Representative
Peter Welch
Democratic

The 2020 United States House of Representatives election in Vermont was held on November 3, 2020, to elect the U.S. representative from Vermont's at-large congressional district. The election coincided with the 2020 U.S. presidential election, as well as other elections to the House of Representatives, elections to the United States Senate and various state and local elections.

Incumbent Democrat Peter Welch would win re-election to his eighth and final term, defeating Republican Miriam Berry by 40 points in the process. Welch would run for and win a seat in the United States Senate in 2022.

== Democratic primary ==
=== Candidates ===
==== Nominee ====
- Peter Welch, incumbent U.S. Representative

==== Eliminated in primary ====
- Ralph Corbo, activist

=== Results ===
Results by county: Welch—>90%

Democratic primary results
Party	Candidate	Votes	%
Democratic	Peter Welch (incumbent)	101,566	95.45
Democratic	Ralph Corbo	4,599	4.32
Write-in		237	0.22
Total votes		106,402	100.00

== Republican primary ==
=== Candidates ===
==== Nominee ====
- Miriam Berry, nurse and screenplay writer

==== Eliminated in primary ====
- Jimmy Rodriguez, activist
- Justin Tuthill, consultant
- Anya Tynio, sales representative for Newport Daily Express and nominee for this district in 2018

=== Results ===
Republican primary results
Party	Candidate	Votes	%
Republican	Miriam Berry	14,368	32.51
Republican	Justin Tuthill	10,915	24.70
Republican	Anya Tynio	8,830	19.98
Republican	Jimmy Rodriguez	8,290	18.76
Write-in		1,789	4.05
Total votes		44,192	100.00

== Progressive primary ==
=== Candidates ===
==== Nominee ====
- John Christopher Brimmer, secretary of the Progressive State Committee, chair of Caledonia County Progressive Committee, Zoning & Planning Administrator of Fairlee (ran to secure Progressive nomination, dropped out before general election)

==== Eliminated in primary ====
- Cris Ericson, perennial candidate

=== Results ===
Progressive primary results
Party	Candidate	Votes	%
Progressive	Chris Brimmer	469	58.04
Progressive	Cris Ericson	236	29.21
Write-in		103	12.75
Total votes		808	100.00

== Independents and other parties ==
=== Candidates ===
==== Declared ====
- Peter R. Becker
- Christopher Helali (Party of Communists USA), former U.S. Army officer, chair of the Orange County Progressive Committee, and organic farmer
- Marcia Horne, Republican nominee for the Essex-Orleans district in 2014 and 2016
- Shawn Orr
- Jerry Trudell, renewable energy activist, pilot, and perennial candidate

== General election ==
=== Predictions ===
Source	Ranking	As of
The Cook Political Report	Safe D	November 2, 2020
Inside Elections	Safe D	October 28, 2020
Sabato's Crystal Ball	Safe D	November 2, 2020
Politico	Safe D	November 2, 2020
Daily Kos	Safe D	November 2, 2020
RCP	Safe D	November 2, 2020

=== Polling ===
Poll source	Date(s) administered	Sample size (Note: Key: A – all adults RV – registered voters LV – likely voters V – unclear)	Margin of error	Peter Welch (D)	Miriam Berry (R)	Other
Braun Research	September 3–15, 2020	582 (LV)	± 4%	57%	18%	16% (Note: "Other/not sure/no opinion" and would not vote with 6%; Becker (I) with 2%; Helali (Communist) and Horne (I) with 1%; Orr (I) and Trudell (I) with 0%)

=== Results ===

2020 Vermont's at-large congressional district
Party	Candidate	Votes	%	±%
Democratic	Peter Welch (incumbent)	238,827	67.31%	−1.89%
Republican	Miriam Berry	95,830	27.01%	+1.06%
Independent	Peter R. Becker	8,065	2.27%	N/A
Independent	Marcia Horne	4,334	1.22%	N/A
Party of Communists USA	Christopher Helali	3,432	0.97%	N/A
Independent	Shawn Orr	1,926	0.54%	N/A
Independent	Jerry Trudell	1,881	0.53%	N/A
Write-in		542	0.15%	+0.08%
Total votes		354,837	100.0%	
Democratic hold				

==== By county ====
By county

County	Peter Welch Democratic		Miriam Berry Republican		Various candidates Other parties	
County	#	%	#	%	#	%
Addison	14,973	69.7%	5,449	25.4%	1,057	4.9%
Bennington	11,987	61.9%	5,851	30.2%	1,513	7.8%
Caledonia	9,319	59.5%	5,486	35.0%	859	5.6%
Chittenden	70,658	74.7%	19,805	21.0%	4,068	4.3%
Essex	1,485	46.8%	1,438	45.3%	252	7.9%
Franklin	14,817	58.8%	9,202	36.5%	1,173	4.6%
Grand Isle	3,031	63.6%	1,540	32.3%	193	4.1%
Lamoille	10,178	70.3%	3,638	25.1%	669	4.6%
Orange	10,579	63.2%	5,132	30.7%	1,018	6.1%
Orleans	7,670	56.4%	5,203	38.3%	719	5.3%
Rutland	18,287	55.5%	11,559	35.1%	3,115	9.5%
Washington	24,734	72.9%	7,793	22.7%	1,873	5.5%
Windham	18,001	72.0%	5,379	21.5%	1,631	6.5%
Windsor	23,108	69.0%	8,355	24.9%	2,041	6.1%
Totals	238,827	67.3%	95,830	27.0%	20,180	5.7%

== See also ==
- 2020 Vermont elections
