= 2018 Vermont gubernatorial election =

- November 6, 2018
- Turnout: 55.6%
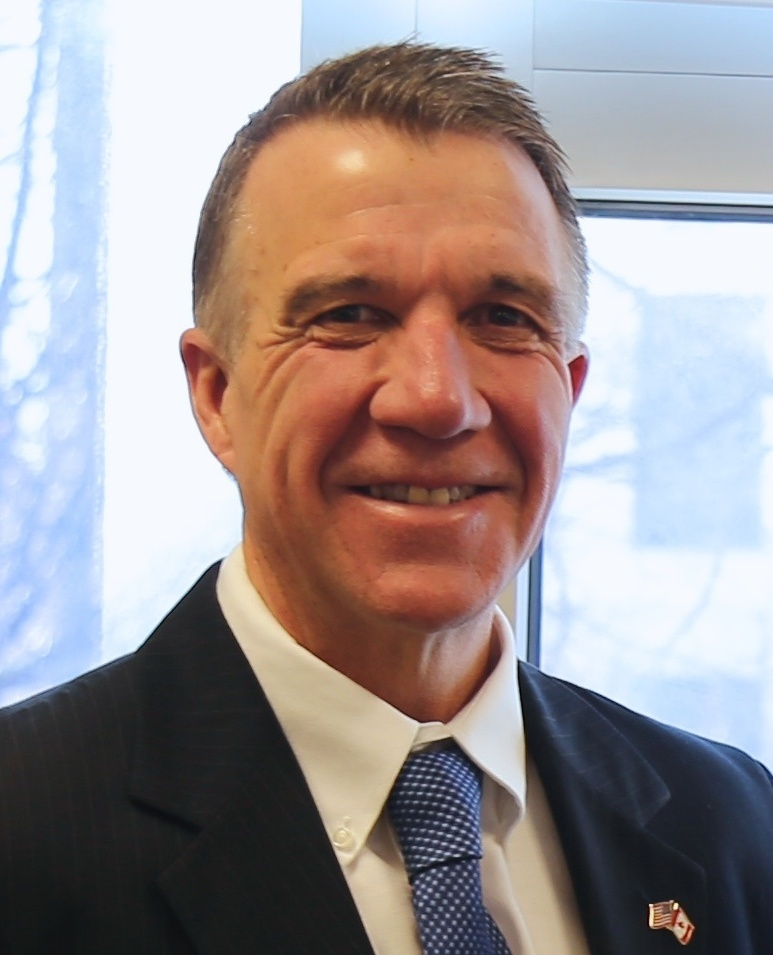

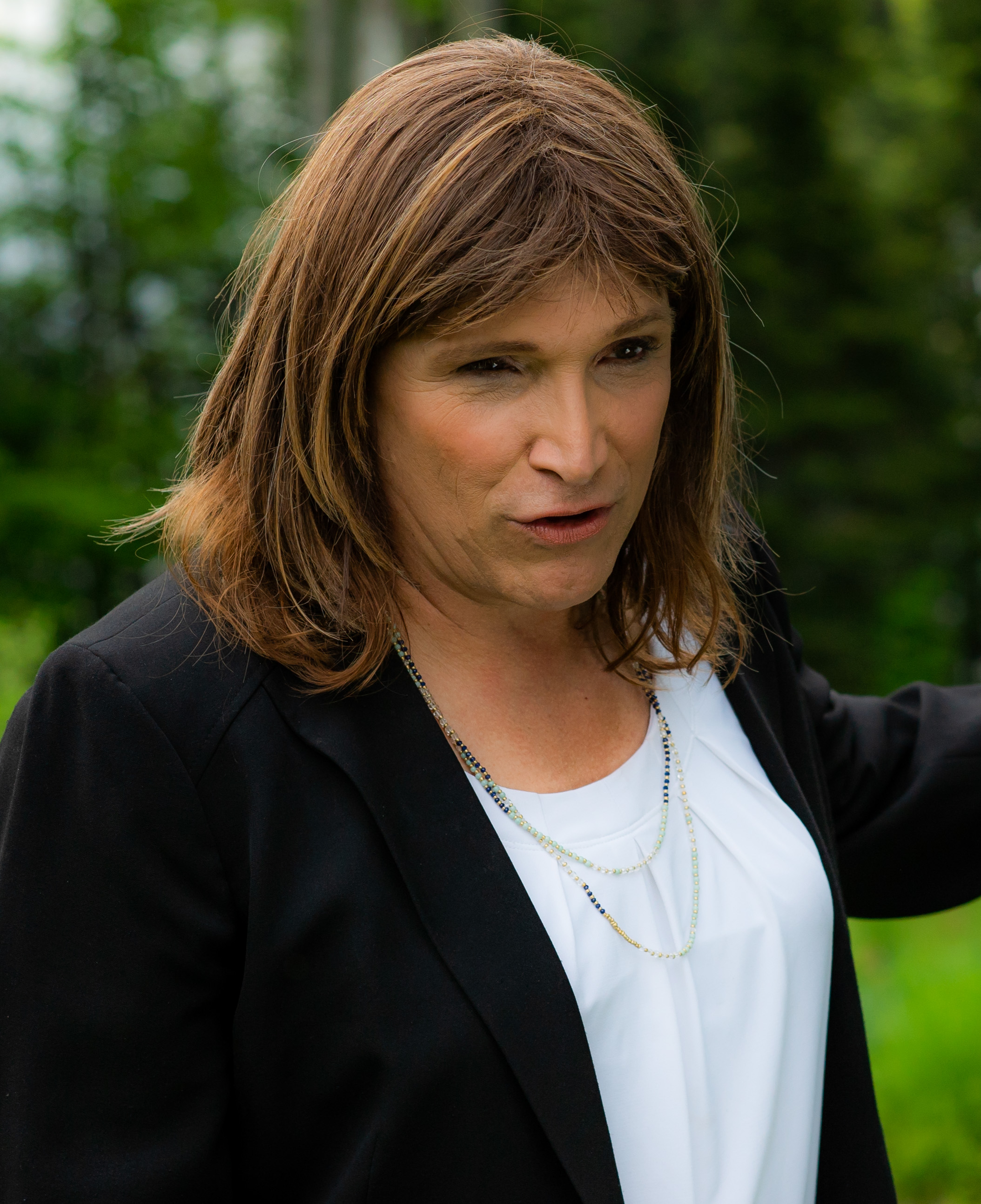
Nominee	Phil Scott	Christine Hallquist
Party	Republican	Democratic
Popular vote	151,261	110,335
Percentage	55.19%	40.25%
- Scott: 40–50% 50–60% 60–70% 70–80% 80–90% Hallquist: 40–50% 50–60% 60–70% 70–80%
Governor before election
Phil Scott
Republican
Elected Governor
Phil Scott
Republican

The 2018 Vermont gubernatorial election took place on November 6, 2018, to elect the governor of Vermont, concurrently with the election of Vermont's Class I U.S. Senate seat, as well as other elections to the United States Senate in other states and elections to the United States House of Representatives and various state and local elections. Incumbent Republican governor Phil Scott, who was first elected in 2016, was re-elected to a second term in office. Hallquist's 40.3% was also the worst performance for a Democratic Party candidate since 2008. This was one of eight Republican-held governorships up for election in a state that Hillary Clinton won in the 2016 presidential election.

Despite initial expectations of a potentially close race due to national blue wave, Scott easily won reelection in what became a difficult year for Republicans, winning by 15 percentage points. This was the last election until 2026 where the Democratic candidate won any counties in the state.

== Background ==
Along with New Hampshire, Vermont is one of only two states where governors are elected to two-year terms. Republican Phil Scott was elected in the 2016 election.

== Republican primary ==
=== Candidates ===
==== Declared ====
- Phil Scott, incumbent governor

==== Eliminated in primary ====
- Keith Stern, businessman, independent candidate for U.S. Senate in 2004, independent candidate for VT-AL in 2006 and Republican candidate in 2010

=== Debates and forums ===
- CCTV Channel 17 Republican Primary Forum for Governor 7/25/2018
- WCAX Democratic+Republican forum 7/31/2018

=== Results ===
Results by county: Scott—70–80% Scott—60–70% Scott—50–60%

Republican primary results
Party	Candidate	Votes	%
Republican	Phil Scott (incumbent)	24,042	66.67
Republican	Keith Stern	11,617	32.22
Republican	Write-ins	401	1.11
Total votes		36,060	100.0
Republican	Blank votes	700	
Republican	Overvotes	20	

== Democratic primary ==
=== Candidates ===
==== Nominated ====
- Christine Hallquist, CEO of Vermont Electric Cooperative

==== Eliminated in primary ====
- James Ehlers, executive director of Lake Champlain International and environmentalist
- John S. Rodgers, State senator (write-in candidate)
- Brenda Siegel, opioid epidemic and hurricane relief activist and worker, former community organizer for Bernie Sanders, and nonprofit executive and founding director (also ran in Progressive primary)
- Ethan Sonneborn, high school freshman (Note: Began his campaign when he was 13 years old. The election was held a few weeks before he entered his freshman year of high school. His campaign was focused on healthcare for all, the environment, economy, and education. Had he won, he would have been the youngest governor in American history. Vermont (as well as Kansas) does not have a minimum age requirement for governor.)

=== Endorsements ===
James Ehlers

Organizations

- AFL-CIO

People

- Ben Cohen
Brenda Siegel

Statewide and local politicians

- Mike Mrowicki, state representative
- Tommy Walz, state representative

Businesses

- Vermont Green Grow Wellness Center

Organizations

- Emerge Vermont
- SolutionsToWork

People

- Mark Hughes, executive director of Justice for All, organizer of Poor Peoples Campaign VT

=== Debates and forums ===
- Brattleboro Community TV Democratic Gubernatorial Candidates Forum 6/6/2018
- CCTV Channel 17 Democratic Primary Forum for Governor hosted by VTDigger 8/2/2018
- WCAX Democratic+Republican forum 7/31/2018

=== Results ===
Results by county: Hallquist—60–70% Hallquist—50–60% Hallquist—40–50% Hallquist—30–40% Siegel—40–50%

Democratic primary results
Party	Candidate	Votes	%
Democratic	Christine Hallquist	27,622	45.07
Democratic	James Ehlers	12,668	20.67
Democratic	Brenda Siegel	12,260	20.01
Democratic	Ethan Sonneborn	4,696	7.66
Democratic	John S. Rodgers (write-in)	950	1.55
Democratic	Write-ins (other)	3,074	5.02
Total votes		61,279	100.0
Democratic	Blank votes	7,997	
Democratic	Overvotes	68	

With this result, Christine Hallquist became the first openly transgender candidate for governor nominated by a major political party in the United States.

== Progressive primary ==
=== Candidates ===
==== Eliminated in primary ====
===== Write-in =====
- Brenda Siegel (also ran in Democratic primary)

=== Endorsements ===
Brenda Siegel

Statewide and local politicians

- Mike Mrowicki, state representative
- Tommy Walz, state representative

Businesses

- Vermont Green Grow Wellness Center

Organizations

- Emerge Vermont
- SolutionsToWork

People

- Mark Hughes, executive director of Justice for All, organizer of Poor Peoples Campaign VT

=== Debates and forums ===
- Brattleboro Community TV Meet the Candidates for VT Governor 7/18/2018

=== Results ===
Vermont Progressive Party primary results
Party	Candidate	Votes	%
Progressive	Brenda Siegel (write-in)	35	8.75
Progressive	Write-ins (other)	365	91.2
Total votes		400	100.0
Progressive	Blank votes	199	

== Libertarian nomination ==
=== Candidates ===
==== Withdrawn ====
- Seth Cournoyer (running for State Senate instead)

== Liberty Union nomination ==
=== Candidates ===
==== Declared ====
- Emily Peyton, candidate for governor in 2014

== Independents ==
=== Candidates ===
==== Declared ====
- Trevor Barlow, business and startup executive and founder, coach, as well as community and nonprofit board volunteer
- Cris Ericson, activist and perennial candidate (also ran for congress)
- Charles Laramie, activist, roofing architect, school teacher, United States Navy veteran, and Vermont Air National Guard
- Stephen Marx, environmentalist

===== Write-in =====
- Tarl Warwick, far-right author, internet personality, and YouTuber

==== Withdrawn ====
- Joseph Barney, auto and agricultural mechanic, member of the Vermont Army National Guard, and school teacher

== General election ==
=== Debates ===
- Complete video of debate, October 17, 2018

=== Predictions ===
Source	Ranking	As of
The Cook Political Report	Safe R	October 26, 2018
The Washington Post	Lean R	November 5, 2018
FiveThirtyEight	Safe R	November 5, 2018
Rothenberg Political Report	Safe R	November 1, 2018
Sabato's Crystal Ball	Safe R	November 5, 2018
RealClearPolitics	Likely R	November 4, 2018
Daily Kos	Likely R	November 5, 2018
Fox News (Note: The Fox News Midterm Power Rankings uniquely does not contain a category for Safe/Solid races)	Likely R	November 5, 2018
Politico	Lean R	November 5, 2018
Governing	Safe R	November 5, 2018

=== Endorsements ===
Christine Hallquist (D)

US Cabinet members and Cabinet-level officials

- Barack Obama, 44th president of the United States
- Joe Biden, 47th vice president of the United States

US senators

- Cory Booker, US senator (D-NJ)
- Elizabeth Warren, US senator (D-MA)
- Bernie Sanders, US senator (I-VT)
- Patrick Leahy, US senator (D-VT)

US representatives

- Joe Kennedy III, US representative (D-MA-4)
- Peter Welch, US representative (D-VT)

Statewide and local politicians

- Martin O'Malley, former governor of Maryland
- Claire Ayer, state senator
- Chris Bray, state senator
- Joey Donovan, state representative
- Alice Emmons, state representative
- Helen Head, state representative
- Matt Hill, state representative
- Warren Kitzmiller, state representative
- Gabe Lucke, state representative
- Curt McCormack, state representative
- Dick McCormack, state senator
- Mary Sullivan, state representative

Individuals

- Misha Collins, actor and former White House intern
- Alexandria Ocasio-Cortez, educator and political activist; Democratic nominee for NY-14 in 2018

Labor unions

- Vermont-NEA

Organizations

- Human Rights Campaign
- Justice Democrats
- LGBTQ Victory Fund
- LPAC
Phil Scott (R)

Statewide and local politicians

- Rep. David Ainsworth
- Rep. Bob Bancroft
- Rep. Fred Baser
- Rep. Lynn Batchelor
- Rep. Scott Beck
- Senate Minority Leader Joe Benning
- Sen. Carolyn Branagan
- Rep. Pat Brennan
- Sen. Randy Brock
- Rep. Tom Burditt
- Rep. Bill Canfield
- Sen. Brian Collamore
- Rep. Larry Cupoli
- Rep. Dennis Devereux
- Rep. Lynn Dickinson
- Rep. Anne Donahue
- Gov. Jim Douglas (former)
- Lt gov. Brian Dubie (former)
- Rep. Peter Fagan
- Rep. Marty Feltus
- Sen. Peg Flory
- Rep. Bob Frenier
- Rep. Marianna Gamache
- Rep. Rodney Graham
- Rep. Jim Harrison
- Rep. Bob Helm
- Rep. Mark Higley
- Rep. Bernie Juskiewicz
- Rep. Brian Keefe
- Rep. Rob LaClair
- Rep. Richard Lawrence
- Rep. Paul Lefebvre
- Rep. Patti Lewis
- Rep. Michael Marcotte
- Rep. Marcia Martel
- Rep. Chris Mattos
- Rep. Pattie McCoy
- Rep. Topper McFaun
- Rep. Mary Morrissey
- Rep. Linda Myers
- Rep. Gary Nolan
- Rep. Corey Parent
- Rep. Chuck Pearce
- Rep. Connie Quimby
- Rep. Carl Rosenquist
- Rep. Brian Savage
- Rep. Heidi Scheuermann
- Rep. Butch Shaw
- Rep. Brian Smith
- Rep. Harvey Smith
- Sen. David Soucy
- Rep. Vicki Strong
- Rep. Tom Terenzini
- House Minority Leader Don Turner
- Rep. Warren Van Wyck
- Rep. Gary Viens
- Sen. Richie Westman
- Rep. Janssen Willhoit
- Rep. Kurt Wright

Organizations

- National Federation of Independent Business
Declined to endorse
- Planned Parenthood Vermont Action Fund

=== Polling ===
Poll source	Date(s) administered	Sample size	Margin of error	Phil Scott (R)	Christine Hallquist (D)	Other	Undecided
Gravis Marketing	October 30 – November 1, 2018	885	± 3.3%	49%	39%	–	12%
Braun Research	October 5–14, 2018	495	± 4.4%	42%	28%	7%	22%
Tulchin Research (D-Vermont Democratic Party)	September 23–26, 2018	406	± 4.9%	50%	42%	–	–

=== Results ===
2018 Vermont gubernatorial election
Party	Candidate	Votes	%	±%
Republican	Phil Scott (incumbent)	151,261	55.19%	+2.28%
Democratic	Christine Hallquist	110,335	40.25%	−3.91%
Independent	Trevor Barlow	3,266	1.19%	N/A
Independent	Charles Laramie	2,287	0.83%	N/A
Marijuana	Cris Ericson	2,129	0.78%	N/A
Earth Rights	Stephen Marx	1,855	0.68%	N/A
Liberty Union	Emily Peyton	1,839	0.66%	−2.17%
Write-in		1,115	0.41%	-0.31%
Total votes		274,087	100.00%	N/A
Republican hold				

==== By county ====
By county

County	Phil Scott Republican		Christine Hallquist Democratic		Various candidates Other parties	
County	#	%	#	%	#	%
Addison	9,514	54.87%	7,203	41.54%	622	3.59%
Bennington	7,351	50.05%	6,152	41.89%	1,183	8.06%
Caledonia	7,427	63.2%	3,850	32.76%	474	4.04%
Chittenden	38,443	50.63%	35,121	46.25%	2,371	3.12%
Essex	1,573	70.98%	506	22.83%	137	6.19%
Franklin	12,592	68.8%	4,991	27.27%	719	3.93%
Grand Isle	2,429	65.49%	1,138	30.68%	141	3.83%
Lamoille	6,571	57.34%	4,548	39.69%	341	2.97%
Orange	7,492	59.55%	4,469	35.52%	621	4.93%
Orleans	6,538	65.71%	3,010	30.25%	402	4.04%
Rutland	15,630	63.87%	7,038	28.76%	1,805	7.37%
Washington	15,182	55.38%	11,340	41.37%	891	3.25%
Windham	7,193	37.72%	10,708	56.16%	1,167	6.12%
Windsor	13,326	52.87%	10,261	40.71%	1,617	6.42%
Totals	151,261	55.19%	110,335	40.26%	12,491	4.55%

Counties that flipped from Democratic to Republican

- Chittenden (largest municipality: Burlington)
- Windsor (largest municipality: Hartford)
