= Northeast Organic Farming Association =

U.S. nonprofit organization

- Founded: 1982
- Purpose: Organic farming
- Location(s): Connecticut, Massachusetts, New Hampshire, New Jersey, New York, Rhode Island and Vermont
- Products: Produce
- Owner: NOFA Interstate Council
- Key people: Bill Duesing; Marion Griswold
- Website: nofa.org

The Northeast Organic Farming Association (NOFA) is a 501(c) non-profit organization in the United States that promotes healthy food, organic farming practices, and a clean environment. It was founded in Connecticut in 1982. The purpose of the organization is to provide educational conferences, workshops, farm tours, and printed materials to educate farmers, gardeners, consumers, and land care professionals.

== Membership ==
NOFA's membership is made up of about 5,000 farmers, gardeners, and consumers. NOFA has chapters in the states of Connecticut, Massachusetts, New Hampshire, New Jersey, New York, Rhode Island, and Vermont. The NOFA Interstate Council coordinates all the chapters, conducts the annual NOFA Summer Conference, and acts as an umbrella organization for projects that concern all of the NOFA chapters, such as the Northeast Interstate Organic Certification Committee.

== See also ==
- The Natural Farmer magazine
