= Jeanette White =

American politician from Vermont

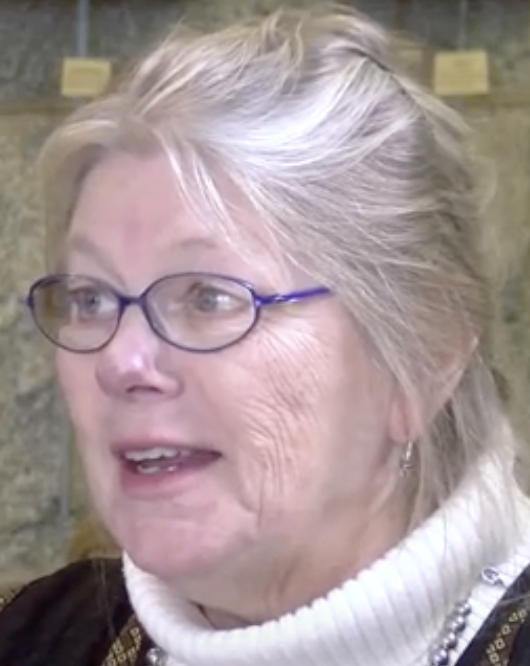
- White in 2017

Member of the Vermont Senate from the Windham district
- In office January 8, 2003 – January 4, 2023
- Preceded by: Peter Shumlin
- Succeeded by: Wendy Harrison; Nader Hashim

Personal details
- Born: May 2, 1943 (age 83) Thief River Falls, Minnesota, U.S.
- Party: Democratic

Jeanette White (born May 2, 1943) is an American politician. A Democrat, she served in the Vermont Senate, representing the Windham district, from 2003 to 2023.

== Biography ==
White was born on May 2, 1943, in Thief River Falls, Minnesota, and moved to Vermont in 1972. She currently lives in Putney, Vermont, with her husband, Bill White. They have two adult children, Laurie and Josh.

White received a bachelor's degree in 1965 from the University of Iowa in political science and sociology. She earned a master's degree in 1972 from Southern Illinois University Carbondale in community development and community education.

== State senator ==
White served as the chair of the Senate Committee on Government Operations and as a member of the Committee on the Judiciary and the Government Accountability Committee. White also served as one of three state senators on the Judicial Nominating Board.
