= Vermont Electric Cooperative =

American consumer-owned electric distribution cooperative

Vermont Electric Cooperative, Inc.
- Type: 501(c)(12) rural electric cooperative utility
- Industry: Electric distribution
- Founded: March 23, 1938; 88 years ago
- Headquarters: Johnson, Vermont, U.S.
- Area served: Vermont, U.S.
- Key people: Rebecca Towne, Chief Executive Officer; Rich Goggin, President
- Revenue: $76,640,149 (2017)
- Net income: $6,705,153 (2017)
- Total assets: $176,829,631 (2017)
- Total equity: $75,534,266 (2017)
- Number of employees: 114 (2017)
- Website: www.vermontelectric.coop

The Vermont Electric Cooperative (VEC) is a consumer-owned electric distribution cooperative headquartered in Johnson, Vermont.

In 2019, Vermont Electric Cooperative served about 34,000 members in 74 towns in northern Vermont, including Addison, Caledonia, Chittenden, Essex, Franklin, Grand Isle, Lamoille, and Orleans counties.

== History ==
Vermont Electric Cooperative was founded in 1938 in Eden Mills to serve residents in parts of rural Lamoille County who had been bypassed by investor-owned utilities. The Rural Electrification Act financed most of the growth in the early years.

Early service was extended into Chittenden and Franklin counties. From the 1940s until the early 1960s, the territory it served expanded in northern Vermont through the construction of new lines and the acquisition of small private companies. In 1969, Vermont Electric Cooperative expanded into southern Vermont by merging with Halifax Electric Cooperative. In 1970, Vermont Electric Cooperative acquired the International Electric Company serving Derby Line.

In 2004, Vermont Electric Cooperative acquired Citizens Communications Company's Vermont Electric Division. This more than doubled the membership-base. In 2006, Vermont Electric Cooperative sold its Southern District in Windham and Windsor counties to Central Vermont Public Service (CVPS), reducing its membership by 2,770. Additionally 12 member services in 3 towns of MA were sold to Western Massachusetts Electric Company (WMECO)

In 2008, Vermont Electric Cooperative sought a 9.2% rate increase from the Vermont Public Service Board. It estimates that the rise in rates from transmission rates from ISO New England will increase its transmission costs by $1.5 million to $6 million total. About 30% of the increase is due to this increased transmission costs.

In 2009, Vermont Electric Cooperative announced that it would purchase 50% of the 40 megawatts Sheffield wind-generated electricity when it becomes available.

The cooperative installed smart meters at 80% of their households from 2007 to 2009. Savings using these have paid for the equipment upgrades.

== Administration ==
A 12-member Board of Directors is elected by members. Seven seats are reserved for geographic districts. Five members are elected by the entire membership.

District 1 includes the towns of Averill, Avery's Gore, Barton, Bloomfield, Brighton, Brownington, Brunswick, Canaan, Charleston, Ferdinand, Guildhall, Holland, Lemington, Lewis, Lyndon, Maidstone, Morgan, Newark, Norton, Sheffield, Sutton, Warner's Grant, Warren Gore, Westmore and Wheelock. There are also towns in Caledonia County. District 2 includes Coventry, Derby, and Newport city. The remaining towns in Orleans County are in District 5. District 4 includes Jay, Lowell, Newport town, Westfield, and Troy. District 8 includes Albany, Barton, Craftsbury, Glover, Greensboro, and towns in Lamoille and Caledonia counties.

The president of the Board of Directors is Dan Carswell.

In 2013, there were 18 candidates for three open seats on the board.

== Programs ==
Vermont Electric Cooperative not only supplies electricity to members, but also offers a range of programs including bill credits for the purchase of certain electric appliances and devices including electric vehicles, plug-in electric vehicles, heat pumps, heat pump hot water heaters, pellet stoves, electric forklifts, and Zero Energy Modular homes. In December 2016, Vermont Electric Cooperative launched Co-op Community Solar, a program under which members can sponsor solar panels in community solar arrays. Members pay an upfront payment for a term of either ten or twenty years and get a fixed monthly credit on their electric bill. Over the term, the total value of the bill credits exceeds the value of the upfront payment.
