= Electoral history of Peter Welch =

American political record

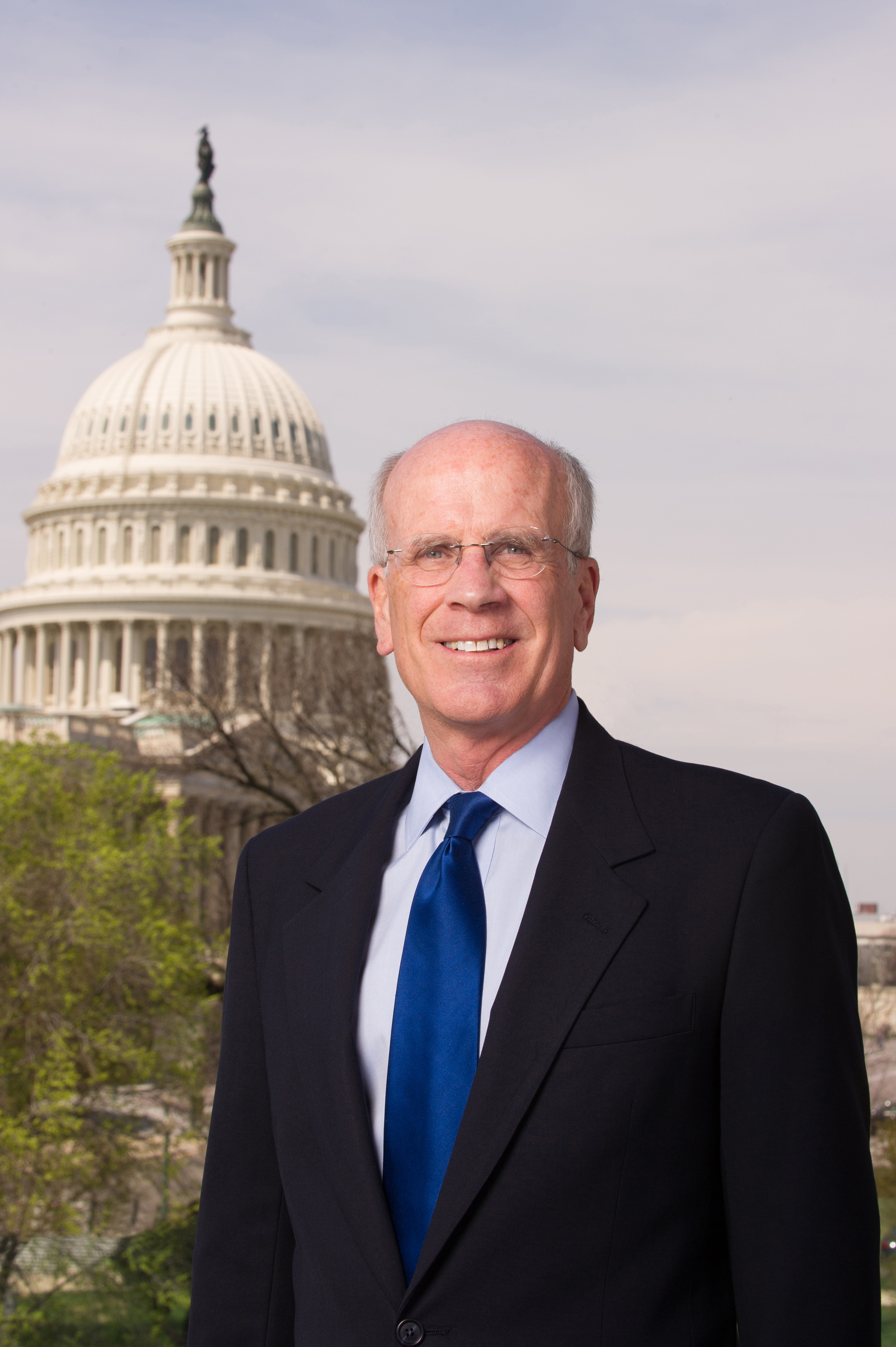
Welch during the 113th Congress

Peter Welch is an attorney and politician currently serving as a United States Senator from Vermont. Welch started his term in the Senate in 2023, and he previously served in the U.S. House of Representatives from 2007 until his promotion in 2023. Welch also served 2 stints in the Vermont Senate from 1981 to 1989, and from 2001 to 2007. Welch had unsuccessfully run for the U.S. House in 1988 and for the Governor of Vermont in 1990.

== Vermont Governor ==
1990 Vermont gubernatorial election
Primary election
Party	Candidate	Votes	%
Democratic	Peter Welch	14,661	86.60%
Democratic	William Gwin	1,719	10.15%
Write-in		550	3.25%
Total votes		16,930	100.00%
General election
Republican	Richard A. Snelling	109,540	51.81%
Democratic	Peter Welch	97,321	46.03%
Libertarian	David Atkinson	2,777	1.31%
Liberty Union	Richard F. Gottlieb	1,389	0.66%
Write-in		395	0.19%
Total votes		211,422	100.00%

== Vermont Senate ==
1986 Vermont Senate Windsor district election
Party	Candidate	Votes	%
Democratic	Peter Welch (incumbent)	13,685	31.00%
Democratic	Edgar May (incumbent)	13,113	29.71%
Democratic	William A. Hunter (incumbent)	9,747	22.08%
Republican	John H. Lancaster	7,558	17.12%
Write-in		41	0.09%
Total votes		44,144	100.00%

2002 Vermont Senate Windsor district election
Primary election
Party	Candidate	Votes	%
Democratic	Peter Welch (incumbent)	3,413	35.03%
Democratic	John Campbell (incumbent)	3,177	32.60%
Democratic	Matt Dunne	3,095	31.76%
Write-in		59	0.61%
Total votes		9,744	100.00%
	Blanks	4,580	
General election
Democratic	John Campbell (incumbent) (Note: In this election, Campbell also received the nomination of the Republican Party.)	12,446	25.71%
Democratic	Peter Welch (incumbent)	11,692	24.15%
Democratic	Matt Dunne	11,543	23.84%
Republican	Henry L. Holmes	7,269	15.01%
Republican	G. Lester Corwin, III	5,375	11.10%
Write-in		94	0.19%
Total votes		48,419	100.00%

2004 Vermont Senate Windsor district election
Primary election
Party	Candidate	Votes	%
Democratic	Peter Welch (incumbent)	2,741	34.74%
Democratic	Matt Dunne (incumbent)	2,637	33.43%
Democratic	John Campbell (incumbent)	2,450	31.06%
Write-in		61	0.77%
Total votes		7,889	100.00%
General election
Democratic	Peter Welch (incumbent)	17,339	23.66%
Democratic	Matt Dunne (incumbent)	16,384	22.36%
Democratic	John Campbell (incumbent)	15,154	20.68%
Republican	John MacGovern	8,317	11.35%
Republican	Charles Kimbell	8,144	11.11%
Republican	Fred Baldwin	7,868	10.74%
Write-in		77	0.11%
Total votes		73,283	100.00%

== U.S. House ==
1988 United States House of Representatives Democratic primary
Party	Candidate	Votes	%
Democratic	Paul N. Poirier	11,024	33.98%
Democratic	Peter Welch	10,758	33.16%
Democratic	James A. Guest	8,301	25.58%
Democratic	Dolores Sandoval	2,131	6.57%
Write-in		231	0.71%
Total votes		32,445	100.00%

2006 United States House of Representatives election in Vermont
Primary election
Party	Candidate	Votes	%
Democratic	Peter Welch	34,706	97.11%
Write-in		1,033	2.89%
Total votes		35,739	100.00%
General election
Democratic	Peter Welch	139,815	53.22%
Republican	Martha Rainville	117,023	44.54%
Impeach Bush Now	Dennis Morrisseau	1,390	0.53%
Independent	Jerry Trudell	1,023	0.39%
Green	Bruce R. Marshall	994	0.38%
Independent	Keith Stern	963	0.37%
Liberty Union	Jane Newton	721	0.27%
We the People	Chris Karr	599	0.23%
Write-in		208	0.08%
Total votes		262,726	100.00%

2008 United States House of Representatives election in Vermont
Primary election
Party	Candidate	Votes	%
Democratic	Peter Welch (incumbent)	19,566	87.74%
Democratic	Craig Barclay Hill	2,635	11.82%
Write-in		98	0.44%
Total votes		22,299	100.00%
General election
Democratic	Peter Welch (incumbent) (Note: In this election, Welch also received the nomination of the Republican Party.)	248,203	83.25%
Independent	Mike Bethel	14,349	4.81%
Energy Independence	Jerry Trudell	10,818	3.63%
Progressive	Thomas James Hermann	9,081	3.05%
Independent	Cris Ericson	7,841	2.63%
Liberty Union	Jane Newton	5,307	1.78%
Write-in		2,552	0.86%
Total votes		298,151	100.00%

2010 United States House of Representatives election in Vermont
Primary election
Party	Candidate	Votes	%
Democratic	Peter Welch (incumbent)	65,920	98.63%
Write-in		913	1.37%
Total votes		66,833	100.00%
	Blanks	7,575	
General election
Democratic	Peter Welch (incumbent)	154,006	64.57%
Republican	Paul D. Beaudry	76,403	32.03%
Independent	Gus Jaccaci	4,704	1.97%
Socialist	Jane Newton	3,222	1.35%
Write-in		186	0.08%
Total votes		238,521	100.00%
	Blanks	5,183	

2012 United States House of Representatives election in Vermont
Primary election
Party	Candidate	Votes	%
Democratic	Peter Welch (incumbent)	36,863	99.04%
Write-in		359	0.96%
Total votes		37,222	100.00%
	Blanks	6,235	
General election
Democratic	Peter Welch (incumbent)	209,312	72.02%
Republican	Mark Donka	67,543	23.24%
Independent	James Desrochers	8,302	2.86%
Liberty Union	Jane Newton	4,065	1.40%
VoteKISS	Andre Laframboise	1,153	0.40%
Write-in		268	0.09%
Total votes		290,643	100.00%
	Blanks	10,257	

2014 United States House of Representatives election in Vermont
Party	Candidate	Votes	%
Democratic	Peter Welch (incumbent)	19,248	98.85%
Write-in		224	1.15%
Total votes		19,472	100.00%
	Blanks	2,291	
General election
Democratic	Peter Welch (incumbent)	123,349	64.41%
Republican	Mark Donka	59,432	31.03%
Independent	Cris Ericson	2,750	1.44%
Liberty Union	Matthew Andrews	2,071	1.08%
Energy Independence	Jerry Trudell	2,024	1.06%
Independent	Randall Meyer	1,685	0.88%
Write-in		193	0.10%
Total votes		191,504	100.00%
	Blanks	4,221	

2016 United States House of Representatives Progressive primary
Party	Candidate	Votes	%
Progressive	Peter Welch (incumbent) (write-in)	164	77.73%
Write-in		47	22.27%
Total votes		211	100.00%
	Blanks/Spoiled	365	

2016 United States House of Representatives Republican primary
Party	Candidate	Votes	%
Republican	Peter Welch (incumbent) (write-in)	2,093	61.06%
Write-in		1,335	38.94%
Total votes		3,428	100.00%
	Blanks/Spoiled	32,966	

2016 United States House of Representatives Democratic primary
Party	Candidate	Votes	%
Democratic	Peter Welch (incumbent)	67,286	99.49%
Write-in		344	0.51%
Total votes		67,630	100.00%
	Blanks/Spoiled	5,532	

2016 United States House of Representatives election in Vermont
Party	Candidate	Votes	%
Democratic	Peter Welch (incumbent)	264,414	89.53%
Liberty Union	Erica Clawson	29,410	9.96%
Write-in		1,510	0.51%
Total votes		295,334	100.00%
	Blanks/Spoiled	25,133	

2018 United States House of Representatives Progressive primary
Party	Candidate	Votes	%
Progressive	Peter Welch (incumbent) (write-in)	237	62.04%
Write-in		145	37.96%
Total votes		382	100.00%
	Blanks/Spoiled	261	

2018 United States House of Representatives Republican primary
Party	Candidate	Votes	%
Republican	H. Brooke Paige	14,703	59.82%
Republican	Anya Tynio	8,481	34.51%
Republican	Peter Welch (incumbent) (write-in)	1,058	4.30%
Write-in		337	1.37%
Total votes		24,579	100.00%
	Blanks/Spoiled	12,410	

2018 United States House of Representatives Democratic primary
Party	Candidate	Votes	%
Democratic	Peter Welch (incumbent)	56,041	83.96%
Democratic	Dan Freilich	7,889	11.82%
Democratic	Benjamin Mitchell	2,680	4.02%
Write-in		134	0.20%
Total votes		66,744	100.00%
	Blanks/Spoiled	3,263	

2018 United States House of Representatives election in Vermont
Party	Candidate	Votes	%
Democratic	Peter Welch (incumbent)	188,547	69.20%
Republican	Anya Tynio	70,705	25.95%
Independent	Cris Ericson	9,110	3.34%
Liberty Union	Laura S. Potter	3,924	1.44%
Write-in		165	0.06%
Total votes		272,451	100.00%
	Blanks/Spoiled	5,779	

2020 United States House of Representatives Progressive primary
Party	Candidate	Votes	%
Progressive	Chris Brimmer	469	58.04%
Progressive	Cris Ericson	236	29.21%
Progressive	Peter Welch (incumbent) (write-in)	75	9.28%
Write-in		28	3.47%
Total votes		808	100.00%
	Blanks/Spoiled	133	

2020 United States House of Representatives Republican primary
Party	Candidate	Votes	%
Republican	Miriam Berry	14,368	32.51%
Republican	Justin Tuthill	10,915	24.70%
Republican	Anya Tynio	8,830	19.98%
Republican	Jimmy Rodriguez	8,290	18.76%
Republican	Peter Welch (incumbent) (write-in)	1,434	3.24%
Write-in		355	0.80%
Total votes		44,192	100.00%
	Blanks/Spoiled	14,434	

2020 United States House of Representatives Democratic primary
Party	Candidate	Votes	%
Democratic	Peter Welch (incumbent)	101,566	95.45%
Democratic	Ralph Corbo	4,599	4.32%
Write-in		237	0.22%
Total votes		106,402	100.00%
	Blanks/Spoiled	2,963	

2020 United States House of Representatives election in Vermont
Party	Candidate	Votes	%
Democratic	Peter Welch (incumbent)	238,833	67.31%
Republican	Miriam Berry	95,830	27.01%
Independent	Peter R. Becker	8,065	2.27%
Independent	Marcia Horne	4,334	1.22%
Party of Communists USA	Christopher Helali	3,432	0.97%
Independent	Shawn Orr	1,926	0.54%
Independent	Jerry Trudell	1,881	0.53%
Write-in		539	0.15%
Total votes		354,840	100.00%
	Blanks/Spoiled	16,131	

== U.S. Senate ==
2022 United States Senate election in Vermont
Primary election
Party	Candidate	Votes	%
Democratic	Peter Welch	86,605	87.01%
Democratic	Isaac Evans-Frantz	7,230	7.26%
Democratic	Niki Thran	5,104	5.13%
Write-in		597	0.60%
Total votes		99,536	100.00%
	Blank/Spoiled	2,872	
General election
Democratic	Peter Welch	196,575	68.47%
Republican	Gerald Malloy	80,468	28.03%
Independent	Dawn Marie Ellis	2,752	0.96%
Green Mountain	Natasha Diamondstone-Kohout	1,574	0.55%
Independent	Kerry Patrick Raheb	1,532	0.53%
Independent	Mark Coester	1,273	0.44%
Independent	Stephen Duke	1,209	0.42%
Independent	Cris Ericson	1,105	0.38%
Write-in		612	0.21%
Total votes		287,099	100.00%
	Blank/Spoiled	4,855	
