= Vermont's at-large congressional district =

At-large U.S. House district for Vermont

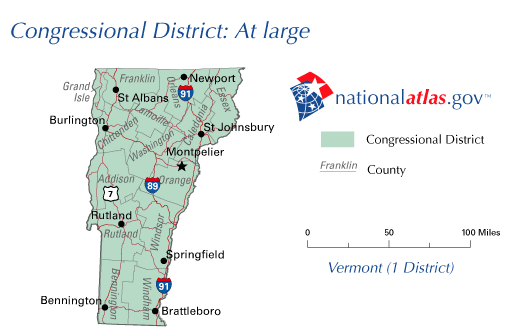
- Representative: Becca Balint; D–Brattleboro
- Area: 9,620 mi^{2} (24,900 km^{2})
- Distribution: 61.1% rural; 38.9% urban
- Population (2025): 644,663
- Median household income: $86,018
- Ethnicity: 89.1% White; 4.6% Two or more races; 2.4% Hispanic; 1.8% Asian; 1.3% Black; 0.7% other
- Occupation: 61% White-collar; 24.6% Blue-collar; 14.4% Gray-collar
- Cook PVI: D+17

Vermont has been represented in the United States House of Representatives by a single at-large congressional district since the 1930 census, when the state lost its second seat, obsoleting its 1st and 2nd congressional districts. There were once six districts in Vermont, all of which were eliminated after various censuses.

Bernie Sanders (Independent) held the seat from 1991 until 2007, when he became a U.S. senator. Democrat Peter Welch, who succeeded Sanders in 2007, represented the state until 2023, when he was elected to succeed Patrick Leahy in the Senate. Progressive Democrat Becca Balint was elected to succeed Welch in the House for the 118th Congress. Balint is the first woman and LGBT person to represent Vermont, making Vermont the last state to be represented in Congress by a woman.

== List of members representing the district ==
Vermont has elected its representatives at-large from 1813 to 1821, beginning with the 13th Congress; 1823 to 1825, with the 18th Congress; and from 1933 to the present, beginning with the 73rd Congress, after being reduced to one representative as a result of the 1930 census. In all other years, Vermont elected its representatives from separate districts.

All members were elected statewide at-large on a general ticket.

=== 13th Congress (1813–1815) ===
- William C. Bradley (DR)
- Ezra Butler (DR)
- James Fisk (DR)
- Charles Rich (DR)
- Richard Skinner (DR)
- William Strong (DR)

=== 14th Congress (1815–1817) ===
- Daniel Chipman (F), until May 5, 1816
- Luther Jewett (F)
- Chauncey Langdon (F)
- Asa Lyon (F)
- Charles Marsh (F)
- John Noyes (F)

=== 15th Congress (1817–1819) ===
- Heman Allen (of Colchester) (DR), until April 20, 1818; vacant thereafter
- Samuel C. Crafts (DR)
- William Hunter (DR)
- Orsamus C. Merrill (DR)
- Charles Rich (DR)
- Mark Richards (DR)

=== 16th Congress (1819–1821) ===
- Samuel C. Crafts (DR)
- Ezra Meech (DR)
- Orsamus C. Merrill (DR), until January 12, 1820
- Rollin C. Mallary (DR), from January 13, 1820
- Charles Rich (DR)
- Mark Richards (DR)
- William Strong (DR)

=== 18th Congress (1823–1825) ===
- Rollin C. Mallary (DR-A)
- William C. Bradley (DR-A)
- Charles Rich (DR-A), until October 15, 1824
- Henry Olin (DR-A), from December 13, 1824
- Daniel A. A. Buck (DR-A)
- Samuel C. Crafts (DR-A)

=== 1933–present: one seat ===
After the 1930 United States census, Vermont was reduced to one seat, which has continued ever since.

| Representative | Party | Years | Cong ress | Electoral history |
|---|---|---|---|---|
District re-established March 4, 1933
| Ernest W. Gibson (Brattleboro) | Republican | March 4, 1933 – October 19, 1933 | 73rd | Redistricted from the 2nd district and re-elected in 1932. Resigned when appointed U.S. senator. |
| Vacant | | October 19, 1933 – January 16, 1934 | 73rd | |
| Charles A. Plumley (Northfield) | Republican | January 16, 1934 – January 3, 1951 | 73rd 74th 75th 76th 77th 78th 79th 80th 81st | Elected to finish Gibson's term. Re-elected in 1934. Re-elected in 1936. Re-elected in 1938. Re-elected in 1940. Re-elected in 1942. Re-elected in 1944. Re-elected in 1946. Re-elected in 1948. Retired. |
| Winston L. Prouty (Newport) | Republican | January 3, 1951 – January 3, 1959 | 82nd 83rd 84th 85th | Elected in 1950. Re-elected in 1952. Re-elected in 1954. Re-elected in 1956. Retired to run for U.S. senator. |
| William H. Meyer (West Rupert) | Democratic | January 3, 1959 – January 3, 1961 | 86th | Elected in 1958. Lost re-election. |
| Robert Stafford (Rutland) | Republican | January 3, 1961 – September 16, 1971 | 87th 88th 89th 90th 91st 92nd | Elected in 1960. Re-elected in 1962. Re-elected in 1964. Re-elected in 1966. Re-elected in 1968. Re-elected in 1970. Resigned when appointed U.S. senator. |
| Vacant | | September 16, 1971 – January 7, 1972 | 92nd | |
| Richard W. Mallary (Bradford) | Republican | January 7, 1972 – January 3, 1975 | 92nd 93rd | Elected to finish Stafford's term. Re-elected in 1972. Retired to run for U.S. senator. |
| Jim Jeffords (Shrewsbury) | Republican | January 3, 1975 – January 3, 1989 | 94th 95th 96th 97th 98th 99th 100th | Elected in 1974. Re-elected in 1976. Re-elected in 1978. Re-elected in 1980. Re-elected in 1982. Re-elected in 1984. Re-elected in 1986. Retired to run for U.S. senator. |
| Peter Plympton Smith (Middlesex) | Republican | January 3, 1989 – January 3, 1991 | 101st | Elected in 1988. Lost re-election. |
| Bernie Sanders (Burlington) | Independent | January 3, 1991 – January 3, 2007 | 102nd 103rd 104th 105th 106th 107th 108th 109th | Elected in 1990. Re-elected in 1992. Re-elected in 1994. Re-elected in 1996. Re-elected in 1998. Re-elected in 2000. Re-elected in 2002. Re-elected in 2004. Retired to run for U.S. senator. |
| Peter Welch (Norwich) | Democratic | January 3, 2007 – January 3, 2023 | 110th 111th 112th 113th 114th 115th 116th 117th | Elected in 2006. Re-elected in 2008. Re-elected in 2010. Re-elected in 2012. Re-elected in 2014. Re-elected in 2016. Re-elected in 2018. Re-elected in 2020. Retired to run for U.S. senator. |
| Becca Balint (Brattleboro) | Democratic | January 3, 2023 – present | 118th 119th | Elected in 2022. Re-elected in 2024. Re-elected in 2026. |

== Electoral history ==
=== 1990 ===
Independent Bernie Sanders defeated incumbent Republican Peter Plympton Smith.

1990 United States House of Representatives election in Vermont: Vermont's at-large district
| Party | Candidate | Votes | % | ±% |
|---|---|---|---|---|
| Independent | Bernie Sanders | 117,522 | 56.0 | |
| Republican | Peter Plympton Smith (incumbent) | 82,938 | 39.52 | |
| Democratic | Dolores Sandoval | 6,315 | 3.01 | |
| Liberty Union | Peter Diamondstone | 1,965 | 0.94 | |
| Write-in | Write-ins | 1,116 | 0.53 | |
| Majority | | 34,584 | 16.48 | |
| Turnout | | 209,856 | | |
| Independent gain from Republican | | Swing | | |

=== 1992 ===
Incumbent Bernie Sanders ran for and won re-election.

1992 United States House of Representatives election in Vermont: Vermont's at-large district
| Party | Candidate | Votes | % | ±% |
|---|---|---|---|---|
| Independent | Bernie Sanders (incumbent) | 162,724 | 57.78 | +1.78% |
| Republican | Tim Philbin | 86,901 | 30.86 | +2.35% |
| Democratic | Lewis E. Young | 22,279 | 7.91 | +4.9% |
| Natural Law | John Dewey | 3,549 | 1.26 | +1.26% |
| Liberty Union | Peter Diamondstone | 3,660 | 1.30 | +0.36% |
| Freedom for LaRouche | Douglas M. Miller | 2,049 | 0.73 | +0.73% |
| Write-in | Write-ins | 464 | 0.16 | −0.37% |
| Majority | | 75,823 | 26.92 | |
| Turnout | | 281,626 | | |
| Independent hold | | Swing | | |

=== 1994 ===
Incumbent Bernie Sanders ran for and won re-election.

1994 United States House of Representatives election in Vermont: Vermont's at-large district
| Party | Candidate | Votes | % | ±% |
|---|---|---|---|---|
| Independent | Bernie Sanders (incumbent) | 105,502 | 44.84 | −12.94% |
| Republican | John Carroll | 98,523 | 41.87 | +11.01% |
| Natural Law | Carole Banus | 2,963 | 1.26 | +0.00 |
| Green | Jack Rogers | 2,664 | 1.13 | +1.13% |
| Liberty Union | Annette Larson | 1,493 | 0.63 | −0.67% |
| Write-in | Write-ins | 304 | 0.13 | −0.03% |
| Majority | | 6,979 | 2.97 | −23.95% |
| Turnout | | 235,279 | | |
| Independent hold | | Swing | | |

=== 1996 ===
Incumbent Bernie Sanders ran for and won re-election.

1996 United States House of Representatives election in Vermont: Vermont's at-large district
| Party | Candidate | Votes | % | ±% |
|---|---|---|---|---|
| Independent | Bernie Sanders (incumbent) | 140,678 | 55.23 | +10.39% |
| Republican | Susan W. Sweetser | 82,021 | 32.59 | −9.28% |
| Democratic | Jack Long | 23,830 | 9.36 | +9.36% |
| Libertarian | Thomas J. Morse | 2,693 | 1.06 | +1.06% |
| Liberty Union | Peter Diamondstone | 1,965 | 0.77 | +0.14% |
| Green | Robert Melamede | 1,350 | 0.53 | −0.60% |
| Natural Law | Norio Kushi | 812 | 0.32 | −0.94% |
| Write-in | Write-ins | 357 | 0.14 | +0.01% |
| Majority | | 57,657 | 22.64 | +19.67% |
| Turnout | | 254,706 | | |
| Independent hold | | Swing | | |

=== 1998 ===
Incumbent Bernie Sanders ran for and won re-election.

1998 United States House of Representatives election in Vermont: Vermont's at-large district
| Party | Candidate | Votes | % | ±% |
|---|---|---|---|---|
| Independent | Bernie Sanders (incumbent) | 136,403 | 63.40 | +8.17% |
| Republican | Mark Candon | 70,740 | 32.88 | +0.29% |
| Green | Matthew Mulligan | 3,464 | 1.61 | +1.08% |
| Liberty Union | Peter Diamondstone | 2,153 | 1.01 | +0.24% |
| Libertarian | Robert Maynard | 2,097 | 0.97 | −0.09% |
| Write-in | Write-ins | 276 | 0.13 | −0.01% |
| Majority | | 65,663 | 30.52 | +7.88% |
| Turnout | | 215,133 | | |
| Independent hold | | Swing | | |

=== 2000 ===
Incumbent Bernie Sanders ran for and won re-election.

2000 United States House of Representatives election in Vermont: Vermont's at-large district
| Party | Candidate | Votes | % | ±% |
|---|---|---|---|---|
| Independent | Bernie Sanders (incumbent) | 196,118 | 69.21 | +5.81% |
| Republican | Karen Ann Kerin | 51,977 | 18.34 | −14.54% |
| Liberty Union | Peter Diamondstone | 14,918 | 5.26 | +3.65% |
| Independent | Stewart Skrill | 4,799 | 1.69 | +1.69% |
| Green | Jack Rogers | 2,978 | 1.05 | −0.56% |
| Libertarian | Daniel H. Krymkowski | 2,978 | 1.05 | +0.08% |
| Write-in | Write-ins | 760 | 0.27 | +0.14% |
| Majority | | 144,141 | 50.87 | +20.35% |
| Turnout | | 283,366 | | |
| Independent hold | | Swing | | |

=== 2002 ===
Incumbent Bernie Sanders ran for and won re-election.

2002 United States House of Representatives election in Vermont: Vermont's at-large district
| Party | Candidate | Votes | % | ±% |
|---|---|---|---|---|
| Independent | Bernie Sanders (incumbent) | 144,880 | 64.32 | −4.89% |
| Republican | William Meub | 72,813 | 32.32 | +13.98% |
| Liberty Union | Jane Newton | 3,185 | 1.41 | −3.85% |
| Grassroots | Fawn Skinner | 2,344 | 1.04 | −0.01% |
| Libertarian | Daniel H. Krymkowski | 2,033 | 0.90 | −0.15% |
| Majority | | 72,067 | 32.00 | |
| Turnout | | 225,255 | | |
| Independent hold | | Swing | | |

=== 2004 ===
Incumbent Bernie Sanders ran for and won re-election.

2004 United States House of Representatives election in Vermont: Vermont's at-large district
| Party | Candidate | Votes | % | ±% |
|---|---|---|---|---|
| Independent | Bernie Sanders (incumbent) | 205,774 | 67.47 | +2.8% |
| Republican | Greg Parke | 74,271 | 24.35 | −7.7% |
| Democratic | Larry Drown | 21,684 | 7.11 | +7.1% |
| Liberty Union | Jane Newton | 3,018 | 0.99 | −0.3% |
| Write-in | Write-ins | 261 | 0.09 | New |
| Majority | | 131,503 | 43.12 | |
| Turnout | | 305,008 | | |
| Independent hold | | Swing | +5.3 | |

=== 2006 ===
Incumbent Bernie Sanders retired to successfully run for a U.S. Senate seat.

Vermont Senate President Pro Tempore Peter Welch (D-Windsor County) was the Democratic nominee and the eventual winner.

Three candidates competed for the Republican nomination:

- Retired Major General Martha Rainville, former Adjutant General of the Vermont National Guard.
- Vermont State senator Mark Shepard of Bennington County.
- Businessman Dennis Morrisseau, who promised to bring articles of impeachment against President George W. Bush.

Rainville won the Republican primary on September 12, beating Shepard by a wide margin.

There were also numerous third party and independent candidates: Chris Karr (WTP), Bruce Marshall (Green Party), Dennis Morrisseau (Ind), Jane Newton (Liberty Union Party), Keith Stern (Ind), and Jerry Trudell (Ind). Morrisseau gathered the most votes, with 1% or 1,383 votes.

By September 14, 2006, the race between Rainville and Welch was close. An American Research Group poll showed Welch with a 48–45% lead.

On October 4, 2006, The Burlington Free Press reported that one of Rainville's staffers, Christopher Stewart, resigned from her campaign after committing plagiarism—copying policy statements from other politicians, including senator Hillary Clinton, and using them on Rainville's website. Rainville's website was off-line for some time while her staff removed the plagiarized passages.

Welch beat Rainville 53% to 45%, or 139,585 votes to 117,211.

2006 United States House of Representatives election in Vermont: Vermont's at-large district
| Party | Candidate | Votes | % | ±% |
|---|---|---|---|---|
| Democratic | Peter Welch (incumbent) | 139,815 | 53.22 | +46.1 |
| Republican | Martha Rainville | 117,023 | 44.54 | +20.1 |
| Independent | Dennis Morrisseau | 1,390 | 0.53 | +0.53 |
| Independent | Jerry Trudell | 1,013 | 0.39 | +0.39 |
| Green | Bruce Marshall | 994 | 0.38 | +0.38 |
| Independent | Keith Stern | 963 | 0.37 | +0.37 |
| Liberty Union | Jane Newton | 721 | 0.27 | −0.7 |
| We the People | Chris Karr | 599 | 0.23 | +0.23 |
| Write-in | Write-ins | 208 | 0.08 | +0.08 |
| Majority | | 22,792 | 8.68 | −34.4 |
| Turnout | | 262,726 | | |
| Democratic gain from Independent | | Swing | | |

=== 2008 ===
2008 United States House of Representatives election in Vermont: Vermont's at-large district
| Party | Candidate | Votes | % | ±% |
|---|---|---|---|---|
| Democratic | Peter Welch (incumbent) | 248,203 | 83.25 | +30.03% |
| Independent | Mike Bethel | 14,349 | 4.18 | +4.18 |
| Energy Independence | Jerry Trudell | 10,818 | 3.63 | +3.63% |
| Progressive | Thomas James Hermann | 9,081 | 3.05 | +3.05% |
| Independent | Cris Ericson | 7,841 | 2.63 | +2.63% |
| Liberty Union | Jane Newton | 5,307 | 1.78 | +1.51% |
| Write-in | Write-ins | 2,552 | 0.86 | +0.78% |
| Majority | | 233,854 | 79.07 | |
| Turnout | | 298,151 | | |
| Democratic hold | | Swing | | |

=== 2010 ===
2010 United States House of Representatives election in Vermont: Vermont's at-large district
| Party | Candidate | Votes | % | ±% |
|---|---|---|---|---|
| Democratic | Peter Welch (incumbent) | 154,006 | 64.57 | −18.68% |
| Republican | Paul D. Beaudry | 76,403 | 32.03 | +32.03% |
| Independent | Gus Jaccaci | 4,704 | 1.97 | +1.97% |
| Socialist | Jane Newton | 3,222 | 1.35 | −0.43% |
| Write-in | Write-ins | 186 | 0.08 | −0.78% |
| Majority | | 77,603 | 32.54 | |
| Turnout | | 238,521 | | |
| Democratic hold | | Swing | | |

=== 2012 ===
2012 United States House of Representatives election in Vermont: Vermont's at-large district
| Party | Candidate | Votes | % | ±% |
|---|---|---|---|---|
| Democratic | Peter Welch (incumbent) | 208,600 | 72.01 | +7.44% |
| Republican | Mark Donka | 67,543 | 23.32 | −8.71% |
| Independent | James "Sam" Desrochers | 8,302 | 2.87 | +0.90% |
| Liberty Union | Jane Newton | 4,065 | 1.40 | +1.40% |
| VoteKISS | Andre Laframboise | 1,153 | 0.40 | +0.40% |
| Majority | | 141,057 | 48.69 | |
| Turnout | | 289,663 | | |
| Democratic hold | | Swing | | |

=== 2014 ===
2014 United States House of Representatives election in Vermont: Vermont's at-large district
| Party | Candidate | Votes | % | ±% |
|---|---|---|---|---|
| Democratic | Peter Welch (incumbent) | 123,349 | 64.41% | −7.60% |
| Republican | Mark Donka | 59,432 | 31.03% | +7.71% |
| Independent | Cris Ericson | 2,750 | 1.44% | N/A |
| Liberty Union | Matthew Andrews | 2,071 | 1.08% | −0.34% |
| Independent | Jerry Trudell | 2,024 | 1.06% | N/A |
| Independent | Randall Meyer | 1,685 | 0.88% | N/A |
| n/a | Write-ins | 193 | 0.10% | N/A |
| Total votes | | '191,504' | '100.0%' | N/A |
| Democratic hold | | | | |

=== 2016 ===
2016 United States House of Representatives election in Vermont: Vermont's at-large district
| Party | Candidate | Votes | % | ±% |
|---|---|---|---|---|
| Democratic/Republican | Peter Welch (incumbent) | 264,414 | 89.53 | +25.12 |
| Liberty Union | Erica Clawson | 29,410 | 9.96 | +8.88 |
| Write-in | | 1,510 | 0.51 | +0.41 |
| Total votes | | 295,334 | 100.0 | |
| Democratic hold | | | | |

=== 2018 ===
2018 United States House of Representatives election in Vermont: Vermont's at-large district
| Party | Candidate | Votes | % | ±% |
|---|---|---|---|---|
| Democratic | Peter Welch (incumbent) | 188,547 | 69.20% | −13.31% |
| Republican | Anya Tynio | 70,705 | 25.95% | N/A |
| Marijuana | Cris Ericson | 9,110 | 3.34% | N/A |
| Liberty Union | Laura Potter | 3,924 | 1.44% | −7.74% |
| Write-in | | 165 | 0.07% | -0.39% |
| Total votes | | 272,451 | 100.0% | N/A |
| Democratic hold | | | | |

=== 2020 ===
2020 United States House of Representatives election in Vermont: Vermont's at-large district
| Party | Candidate | Votes | % | ±% |
|---|---|---|---|---|
| Democratic | Peter Welch (incumbent) | 238,827 | 67.31% | −1.89% |
| Republican | Miriam Berry | 95,830 | 27.01% | +1.06% |
| Independent | Peter R. Becker | 8,065 | 2.27% | N/A |
| Independent | Marcia Horne | 4,334 | 1.22% | N/A |
| Communist | Christopher Helali | 3,432 | 0.97% | N/A |
| Independent | Shawn Orr | 1,926 | 0.54% | N/A |
| Independent | Jerry Trudell | 1,881 | 0.53% | N/A |
| Write-in | | 542 | 0.15% | +0.08% |
| Total votes | | 345,837 | 100.0% | N/A |
| Democratic hold | | | | |

=== 2022 ===
2022 United States House of Representatives election in Vermont: Vermont's at-large district
| Party | Candidate | Votes | % | ±% |
|---|---|---|---|---|
| Democratic | Becca Balint | 176,494 | 60.45% | –6.86 |
| Republican | Liam Madden | 78,297 | 26.85% | −0.16% |
| Libertarian | Ericka Redic | 12,590 | 4.31% | N/A |
| Independent | Matt Druzba | 5,737 | 1.97% | N/A |
| Independent | Luke Talbot | 4,428 | 1.52% | N/A |
| Independent | Adam Ortiz | 3,376 | 1.16% | N/A |
| Total votes | | 291,955 | 100.0% | |
| Democratic hold | | | | |

=== 2024 ===
2024 United States House of Representatives election in Vermont: Vermont's at-large district
| Party | Candidate | Votes | % | ±% |
|---|---|---|---|---|
| Democratic | Becca Balint (incumbent) | 218,398 | 62.29% | +1.84 |
| Republican | Mark Coester | 104,451 | 29.79% | –2.94 |
| Independent | Adam Ortiz | 19,286 | 5.50% | +4.34 |
| Green Mountain Peace and Justice | Jessy Diamondstone | 7,552 | 2.15% | N/A |
| Write-in | | 929 | 0.25% | –0.09 |
| Total votes | | 350,616 | 100.0% | |
| Democratic hold | | | | |

== Sources ==
- Office of the Clerk: Election Statistics since 1920
- Martis, Kenneth C. (1989). The Historical Atlas of Political Parties in the United States Congress. New York: Macmillan Publishing Company.
- Martis, Kenneth C. (1982). The Historical Atlas of United States Congressional Districts. New York: Macmillan Publishing Company.
- Congressional Biographical Directory of the United States 1774–present
