= 2026 United States House of Representatives election in Vermont =

2026 United States House of Representatives election in Vermont's at-large district
- November 3, 2026
- Reporting: 98% as of Nov. 5, 6:04 PM EST
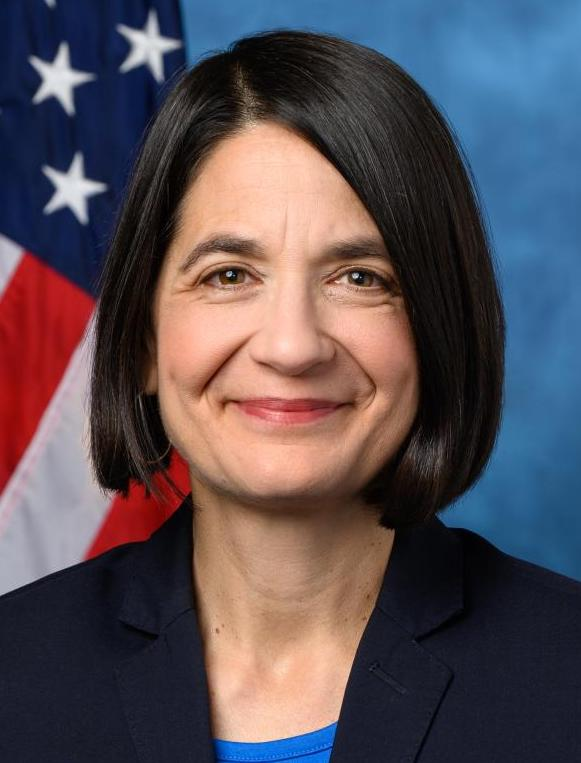

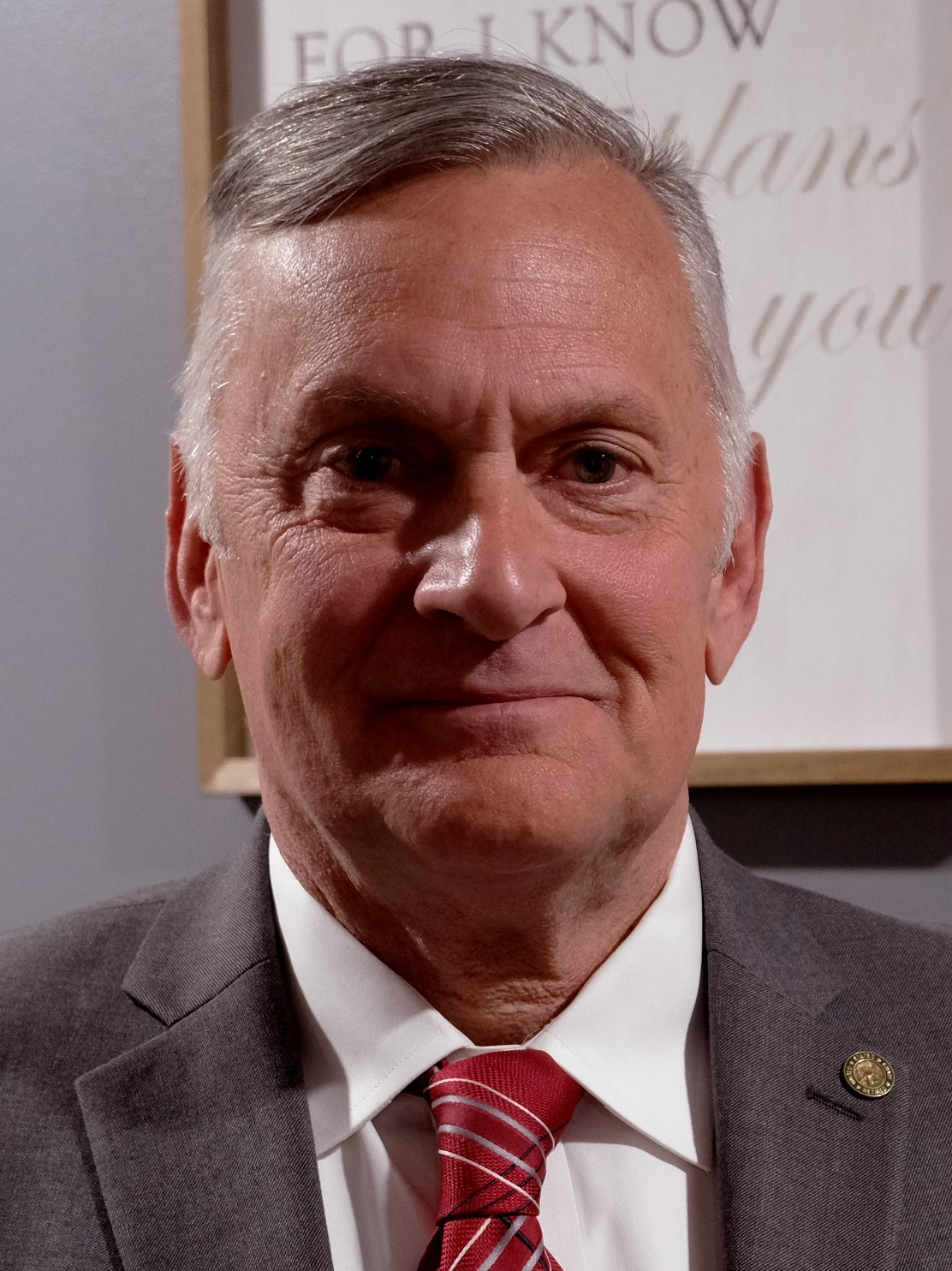
Nominee	Becca Balint	Gerald Malloy
Party	Democratic	Republican
Popular vote	198,766	94,071
Percentage	65.2%	30.9%
- Balint: 40–50% 50–60% 60–70% 70–80% 80–90% Malloy: 40–50% 50–60% 60–70% Tie: 40–50% No votes
U.S. representative before election
Becca Balint
Democratic
Elected U.S. representative
Becca Balint
Democratic

The 2026 United States House of Representatives election in Vermont was held on November 3, 2026, to elect a member of the United States House of Representatives to represent Vermont's at-large district. Democratic incumbent Becca Balint was re-elected to a third term. She was challenged by Republican former military officer Gerald Malloy.

Primary elections took place on August 11, 2026. In the Democratic primary, Balint secured 98.4% of the vote against write-in opposition. Malloy defeated perennial candidate Mark Coester in the Republican primary with 76.3% of the vote.

== Democratic primary ==
=== Candidates ===
==== Nominee ====
- Becca Balint, incumbent U.S. representative (2023–present)

=== Endorsements ===
Becca Balint

Individuals

- Ms. Rachel, YouTuber and children's educator

Organizations

- Christopher Street Project
- Center for Freethought Equality
- End Citizens United
- Equality PAC
- Human Rights Campaign
- J Street
- Joint Action Committee for Political Affairs
- Planned Parenthood Action Fund
- Population Connection
- Progressive Democrats of America
- Progressive Change Campaign Committee
- Track AIPAC
- Vote Mama

Newspapers

- Addison County Independent (Democratic primary only)

=== Fundraising ===
Campaign finance reports as of March 31, 2026
Candidate	Raised	Spent	Cash on hand
Becca Balint (D)	$738,567	$367,647	$516,681
Source: Federal Election Commission

=== Results ===
Democratic primary results
Party	Candidate	Votes	%
Democratic	Becca Balint (incumbent)	79,679	98.4
Write-in		1,272	1.6
Total votes		80,951	100.0

== Republican primary ==
=== Candidates ===
==== Nominee ====
- Gerald Malloy, retired military officer, and nominee for U.S. Senate in 2022 and 2024

==== Eliminated in primary ====
- Mark Coester, truck driver and perennial candidate

==== Did not file ====
- Gavin Solomon, businessman from New York

=== Endorsements ===
Gerald Malloy

Newspapers

- Addison County Independent (Republican primary only)

=== Fundraising ===
Campaign finance reports as of March 31, 2026
Candidate	Raised	Spent	Cash on hand
Mark Coester (R)	$32,687	$14,066	$9,550
Source: Federal Election Commission

==== Polling ====
Poll source	Date(s) administered	Sample size (Note: Key: A – all adults RV – registered voters LV – likely voters V – unclear)	Margin of error	Mark Coester	Gerald Malloy	Other	Undecided
University of New Hampshire	July 15–20, 2026	220 (LV)	± 6.6%	6%	58%	4% (Note: "Write in someone else" at 4%)	32%
University of New Hampshire	June 18–23, 2026	237 (LV)	± 6.4%	19%	48%	1% (Note: "Write in someone else" at 1%)	32%

=== Results ===
Republican primary results
Party	Candidate	Votes	%
Republican	Gerald Malloy	15,662	76.3
Republican	Mark Coester	4,523	22.0
Write-in		344	1.7
Total votes		20,529	100.0

== Independent and third party candidates ==
- Phoenix Altair (Independent)
- Andrew Giusto (Unity Party; write-in)
- Adam Ortiz (Independent), window installation contractor and candidate for U.S. House in 2022 and 2024
- Suzanne "Suz" Seymour (Independent)
- Ryan Walton (Independent)

== General election ==
=== Predictions ===
Source	Ranking	As of
The Cook Political Report	Solid D	February 6, 2025
Decision Desk HQ	Safe D	July 14, 2026
Inside Elections	Solid D	March 7, 2025
Sabato's Crystal Ball	Safe D	August 14, 2025

=== Post-primary endorsements ===
Becca Balint (D)

Labor unions

- National Education Association

=== Fundraising ===
Campaign finance reports as of July 23, 2026
Candidate	Raised	Spent	Cash on hand
Becca Balint (D)	$956,339	$475,768	$626,332
Gerald Malloy (R)	$58,280	$38,573	$19,707
Source: Federal Election Commission

=== Polling ===
Poll source	Date(s) administered	Sample size	Margin of error	Becca Balint (D)	Gerald Malloy (R)	Other	Undecided
Braun Research/Vermont Public	September 10–21, 2026	817 (RV)	± 3.4%	43%	28%	7% (Note: "None/Write-in/Other" with 2%; Adam Ortiz (I) with 2%; Suzanne Seymour (I) with 2%; Ryan Walton (I) with 1%; Phoenix Altair (I) with 0%)	22%
Braun Research/Vermont Public	September 10–21, 2026	732 (LV)	± 3.4%	47%	30%	5% (Note: Suzanne Seymour (I) with 2%; "None/Write-in/Other" with 1%; Adam Ortiz (I) with 1%; Ryan Walton (I) with 1%; Phoenix Altair (I) with 0%)	18%
University of New Hampshire	September 17–21, 2026	835 (LV)	± 3.4%	66%	30%	1% (Note: Suzanne Seymour (I) with 1%)	3%
	August 11, 2026	Primary elections					
University of New Hampshire	July 15–20, 2026	954 (LV)	± 3.2%	63%	25%	3% (Note: Adam Ortiz (I) with 2%; "Another candidate" with 1%)	9%
University of New Hampshire	June 18–23, 2026	887 (LV)	± 3.3%	57%	26%	1% (Note: Adam Ortiz (I) with 1%)	16%

Hypothetical polling

Becca Balint vs. Mark Coester

Poll source	Date(s) administered	Sample size	Margin of error	Becca Balint (D)	Mark Coester (R)	Other	Undecided
University of New Hampshire	July 15–20, 2026	954 (LV)	± 3.2%	64%	25%	3%	8%
University of New Hampshire	June 18–23, 2026	887 (LV)	± 3.3%	57%	26%	1%	15%

=== Result ===
2026 Vermont's at-large congressional district election
Party	Candidate	Votes	%	±%
Democratic	Becca Balint (incumbent)	198,766	65.22%	+2.93
Republican	Gerald Malloy	94,071	30.87%	+1.08
Independent	Suzanne Seymour	4,362	1.43%	N/A
Independent	Ryan P. Walton	2,733	0.90%	N/A
Independent	Phoenix K. Altair	2,347	0.77%	N/A
Independent	Adam Ortiz	2,195	0.72%	–4.78
Write-in		295	0.10%	–0.15
Total votes		304,769	100.0%	
Democratic hold				
