= 2004 Vermont elections =

- November 2, 2004

A general election was held in the U.S. state of Vermont on November 2, 2004. All of Vermont's executive officers were up for election as well as Vermont's at-large seat in the U.S. House and Class 3 U.S. Senate seat. The 2004 presidential election was also held at the same time.

== Lieutenant governor ==
2004 Vermont lieutenant gubernatorial election
- November 2, 2004
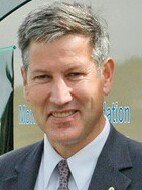

| Nominee | Brian Dubie | Cheryl Pratt Rivers | Steve Hingtgen |
| Party | Republican | Democratic | Progressive |
| Popular vote | 170,270 | 108,600 | 21,553 |
| Percentage | 56.0% | 35.7% | 7.1% |
- Dubie: 40–50% 50–60% 60–70% 70–80% 80–90% Rivers: 40–50% 50–60% 60–70% No Data/Vote
Lieutenant Governor before election
Brian E. Dubie
Republican
Elected Lieutenant Governor
Brian E. Dubie
Republican

Incumbent Republican Lieutenant Governor Brian E. Dubie (since 2003) ran again for a second term.

=== Republican primary ===
Brian E. Dubie was unopposed in the Republican primary.

Republican primary results
| Party | Candidate | Votes | % |
|---|---|---|---|
| Republican | Brian E. Dubie (incumbent) | 15,275 | 100.0 |
| Total votes | | 15,275 | 100% |

=== Democratic primary ===
==== Candidates ====
- Robert Wolcott Backus, Democratic candidate for U.S. Senate in 2000
- Cheryl Pratt Rivers, Member of the Vermont Senate from Windsor County (1991–2003)

==== Results ====
Democratic primary results
| Party | Candidate | Votes | % |
|---|---|---|---|
| Democratic | Cheryl Pratt Rivers | 14,819 | 52.7 |
| Democratic | Robert Wolcott Backus | 12,931 | 46.0 |
| Democratic | Write-ins | 374 | 1.3 |
| Total votes | | 28,124 | 100% |

=== Progressive primary ===
Steve Hingtgen, member of the Vermont House of Representatives from Chittenden 7-2 (1999–2003) and Chittenden 3-3 (2003–2005), ran unopposed in the Progressive primary.

Progressive primary results
| Party | Candidate | Votes | % |
|---|---|---|---|
| Progressive | Steve Hingtgen | 621 | 91.2 |
| Progressive | Write-ins | 60 | 8.8 |
| Total votes | | 681 | 100% |

=== General election ===
==== Candidates ====
- Brian E. Dubie (R)
- Steve Hingtgen (P)
- Cheryl Pratt Rivers (D)
- Peter Stevenson (LU)

==== Debates and forums ====
- WDEV Lt. Governor Candidate Forum 10/7/2004

==== Results ====
2004 Vermont lieutenant gubernatorial election
| Party | Candidate | Votes | % | ±% |
|---|---|---|---|---|
| Republican | Brian E. Dubie (incumbent) | 170,270 | 56.0 | +14.8 |
| Democratic | Cheryl Pratt Rivers | 108,600 | 35.7 | +3.5 |
| Progressive | Steve Hingtgen | 21,553 | 7.1 | −17.7 |
| Liberty Union | Peter Stevenson | 3,291 | 1.1 | −0.8 |
| Write-in | Write-ins | 210 | 0.01 | n/a |
| Total votes | | 303,924 | 100% | |
| Republican hold | | Swing | +8.8 | |

== Secretary of State ==
2004 Vermont secretary of state election
- November 2, 2004
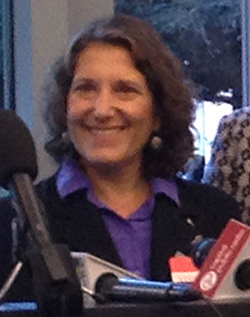
| Nominee | Deborah Markowitz |
| Party | Democratic |
| Popular vote | 270,744 |
| Percentage | 99.4% |
- Markowitz: 90–100% No Data/Vote
Secretary of State before election
Deborah Markowitz
Democratic
Elected Secretary of State
Deborah Markowitz
Democratic

Incumbent Democratic Secretary of State Deborah Markowitz (since 1999) ran unopposed for a fourth term.

=== Democratic primary ===
Markowitz ran unopposed in the Democratic primary.

Democratic primary results
| Party | Candidate | Votes | % |
|---|---|---|---|
| Democratic | Deborah Markowitz (incumbent) | 25,723 | 99.8 |
| Democratic | Write-ins | 60 | 0.2 |
| Total votes | | 25,783 | 100% |

=== Republican primary ===
Markowitz also ran unopposed in the Republican primary as a write-in candidate.

Republican primary results
| Party | Candidate | Votes | % |
|---|---|---|---|
| Republican | Deborah Markowitz (incumbent) (write-in) | 1,042 | 74.7 |
| Republican | Write-ins (other) | 352 | 25.3 |
| Total votes | | 1,394 | 100% |

=== General election ===
==== Candidates ====
- Deborah Markowitz (D)

==== Results ====
2004 Vermont secretary of state election
| Party | Candidate | Votes | % | ±% |
|---|---|---|---|---|
| Democratic | Deborah Markowitz (incumbent) | 270,744 | 99.4 | +40.6 |
| Write-in | Write-ins | 1,737 | 0.6 | n/a |
| Total votes | | 272,481 | 100% | |
| Democratic hold | | Swing | +40.6 | |

== Treasurer ==
2004 Vermont treasurer election
- November 2, 2004
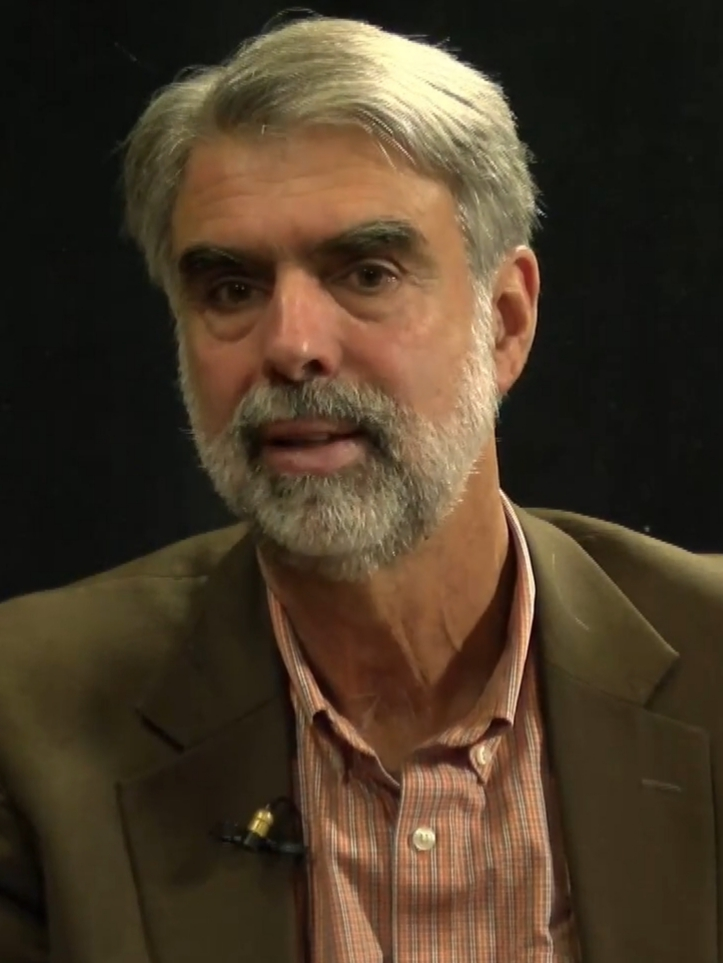
| Nominee | Jeb Spaulding |
| Party | Democratic |
| Popular vote | 273,705 |
| Percentage | 99.4% |
- Spaulding: 90–100% No Data/Vote
Treasurer before election
Jeb Spaulding
Democratic
Elected Treasurer
Jeb Spaulding
Democratic

Incumbent Democratic Treasurer Jeb Spaulding (since 2003) ran unopposed for a second term.

=== Democratic primary ===
Spaulding ran unopposed in the Democratic primary.

Democratic primary results
| Party | Candidate | Votes | % |
|---|---|---|---|
| Democratic | Jeb Spaulding (incumbent) | 24,730 | 99.8 |
| Democratic | Write-ins | 41 | 0.2 |
| Total votes | | 24,771 | 100% |

=== Republican primary ===
Spaulding also ran unopposed in the Republican primary as a write-in candidate.

Republican primary results
| Party | Candidate | Votes | % |
|---|---|---|---|
| Republican | Jeb Spaulding (incumbent) (write-in) | 1,026 | 73.3 |
| Republican | Write-ins (other) | 373 | 26.7 |
| Total votes | | 1,399 | 100% |

=== General election ===
==== Candidates ====
- Jeb Spaulding (D)

==== Results ====
2004 Vermont treasurer election
| Party | Candidate | Votes | % | ±% |
|---|---|---|---|---|
| Democratic | Jeb Spaulding (incumbent) | 273,705 | 99.4 | +42.2 |
| Write-in | Write-ins | 1,537 | 0.6 | n/a |
| Total votes | | 222,798 | 100% | |
| Democratic hold | | Swing | +42.2 | |

== Attorney general ==
2004 Vermont attorney general election
- November 2, 2004

| Nominee | William H. Sorrell | Dennis Carver | Susan A. Davis |
| Party | Democratic | Republican | Progressive |
| Popular vote | 169,726 | 90,285 | 14,351 |
| Percentage | 59.8% | 28.7% | 5.2% |
- Sorrell: 30–40% 40–50% 50–60% 60–70% 70–80% 80–90% Carver: 40–50% 50–60% 60–70% No Data/Vote
Attorney General before election
William H. Sorrell
Democratic
Elected Attorney General
William H. Sorrell
Democratic

Incumbent Attorney General William H. Sorrell (since 1997) ran again for a fifth term.

=== Democratic primary ===
Sorrell was unopposed in the Democratic primary.

Democratic primary results
| Party | Candidate | Votes | % |
|---|---|---|---|
| Democratic | William H. Sorrell (incumbent) | 23,942 | 98.8 |
| Democratic | Write-ins | 286 | 1.2 |
| Total votes | | 24,228 | 100% |

=== Republican primary ===
==== Candidates ====
- Dennis Carver
- Sylvia R. Kennedy
- Karen Ann Kerin, Republican candidate for U.S. Representative in 2000 and 2002

==== Results ====
Republican primary results
| Party | Candidate | Votes | % |
|---|---|---|---|
| Republican | Dennis Carver | 5,973 | 44.7 |
| Republican | Sylvia R. Kennedy | 4,669 | 35.0 |
| Republican | Karen Ann Kerin | 2,161 | 16.2 |
| Republican | Write-ins | 549 | 4.1 |
| Total votes | | 13,352 | 100% |

=== Progressive primary ===
==== Candidates ====
- Susan A. Davis, Progressive nominee for State Representative from Orleans 2 in 2002
- Boots Wardinski, Liberty Union nominee for Attorney General in 2002, for State Representative in 2000, 1998, 1996, and for State Senator in 1992 and 1990, farmer

==== Results ====
Progressive primary results
| Party | Candidate | Votes | % |
|---|---|---|---|
| Progressive | Susan A. Davis | 264 | 43.3 |
| Progressive | Boots Wardinski | 224 | 36.8 |
| Progressive | Write-ins | 124 | 20.3 |
| Total votes | | 612 | 100% |

=== Liberty Union nomination ===
After losing the Progressive primary, Boots Wardinski ran unopposed for the Liberty Union State Committee's nomination.

=== Libertarian nomination ===
After losing the Republican primary, Karen Ann Kerin, Republican candidate for U.S. Representative in 2000 and 2002, ran unopposed for the Libertarian State Committee's nomination.

=== Grassroots nomination ===
James Mark Leas ran unopposed for the Grassroots State Committee's nomination.

=== General election ===
==== Candidates ====
- Karen Ann Kerin (L)
- Dennis Carver (R)
- Susan A. Davis (P)
- William H. Sorrell (D)
- Boots Wardinski (LU)
- James Mark Leas (GR)

==== Results ====
2004 Vermont attorney general election
| Party | Candidate | Votes | % | ±% |
|---|---|---|---|---|
| Democratic | William H. Sorrell (incumbent) | 169,726 | 59.8 | +3.2 |
| Republican | Dennis Carver | 90,285 | 28.7 | −1.7 |
| Progressive | Susan A. Davis | 14,351 | 5.2 | −2.1 |
| Grassroots | James Mark Leas | 8,769 | 3.1 | +0.3 |
| Libertarian | Karen Ann Kerin | 6,357 | 2.2 | +0.4 |
| Liberty Union | Boots Wardinski | 2,944 | 1.0 | 0.0 |
| Write-in | Write-ins | 267 | 0.1 | n/a |
| Total votes | | 292,699 | 100% | |
| Democratic hold | | Swing | +3.2 | |

== Auditor of Accounts ==
2004 Vermont auditor of accounts election
- November 2, 2004
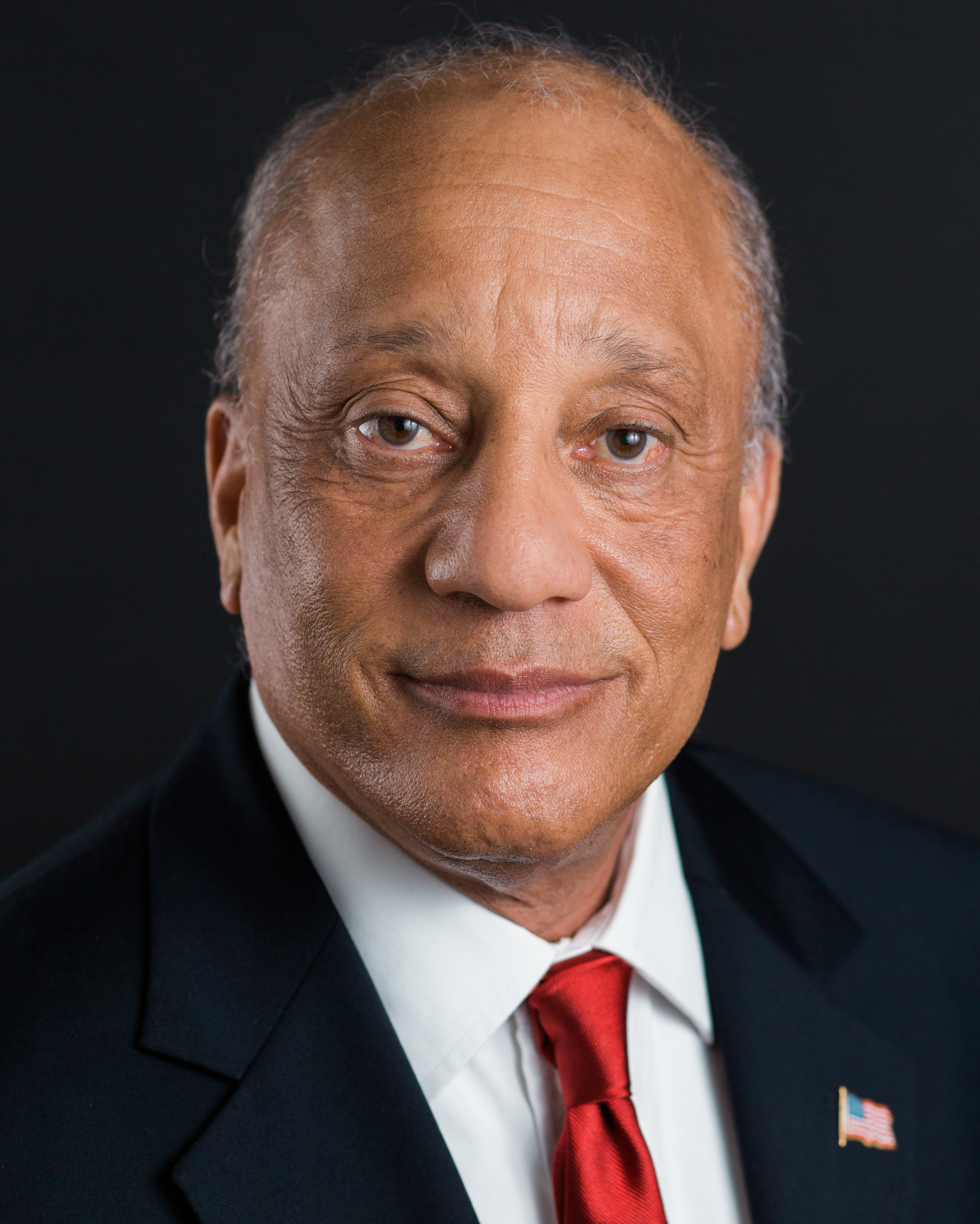

| Nominee | Randy Brock | Elizabeth M. Ready | Jerry Levy |
| Party | Republican | Democratic | Liberty Union |
| Popular vote | 152,848 | 122,498 | 17,685 |
| Percentage | 52.1% | 41.7% | 6.0% |
- Brock: 40–50% 50–60% 60–70% 70–80% 80–90% Ready: 40–50% 50–60% 60–70% Levy: 30–40% No Data/Vote
Auditor of Accounts before election
Elizabeth M. Ready
Democratic
Elected Auditor of Accounts
Randy Brock
Republican

Incumbent Democratic Auditor Elizabeth M. Ready (since 2001) ran again for a third term. As of 2026, this is the last time a Republican was elected Vermont Auditor.

=== Democratic primary ===
Ready ran unopposed in the Democratic primary.

Democratic primary results
| Party | Candidate | Votes | % |
|---|---|---|---|
| Democratic | Elizabeth M. Ready (incumbent) | 23,692 | 100.0 |
| Democratic | Write-ins | 273 | 1.1 |
| Total votes | | 23,965 | 100% |

=== Republican primary ===
Randy Brock ran unopposed in the Republican primary.

Republican primary results
| Party | Candidate | Votes | % |
|---|---|---|---|
| Republican | Randy Brock | 12,069 | 96.9 |
| Republican | Write-ins | 385 | 3.1 |
| Total votes | | 12,454 | 100% |

=== Liberty Union nomination ===
Jerry Levy, Liberty Union nominee for Treasurer in 2002, U.S. Senate in 2000, 1998, 1994, 1992, 1988, 1986, and 1982, Vermont Secretary of State in 1984, and Auditor in 1980, ran unopposed for the Liberty Union State Committee's nomination.

=== General election ===
==== Candidates ====
- Randy Brock (R)
- Jerry Levy (LU)
- Elizabeth M. Ready (D)

==== Results ====
2004 Vermont auditor of accounts election
| Party | Candidate | Votes | % | ±% |
|---|---|---|---|---|
| Republican | Randy Brock | 152,848 | 52.1 | +9.8 |
| Democratic | Elizabeth M. Ready (incumbent) | 122,498 | 41.7 | −9.6 |
| Liberty Union | Jerry Levy | 17,685 | 6.0 | +5.0 |
| Write-in | Write-ins | 390 | 0.1 | n/a |
| Total votes | | 293,421 | 100% | |
| Republican gain from Democratic | | Swing | +9.8 | |
