= 2014 United States House of Representatives election in Vermont =

2014 United States House of Representatives election in Vermont's at-large district
- November 4, 2014
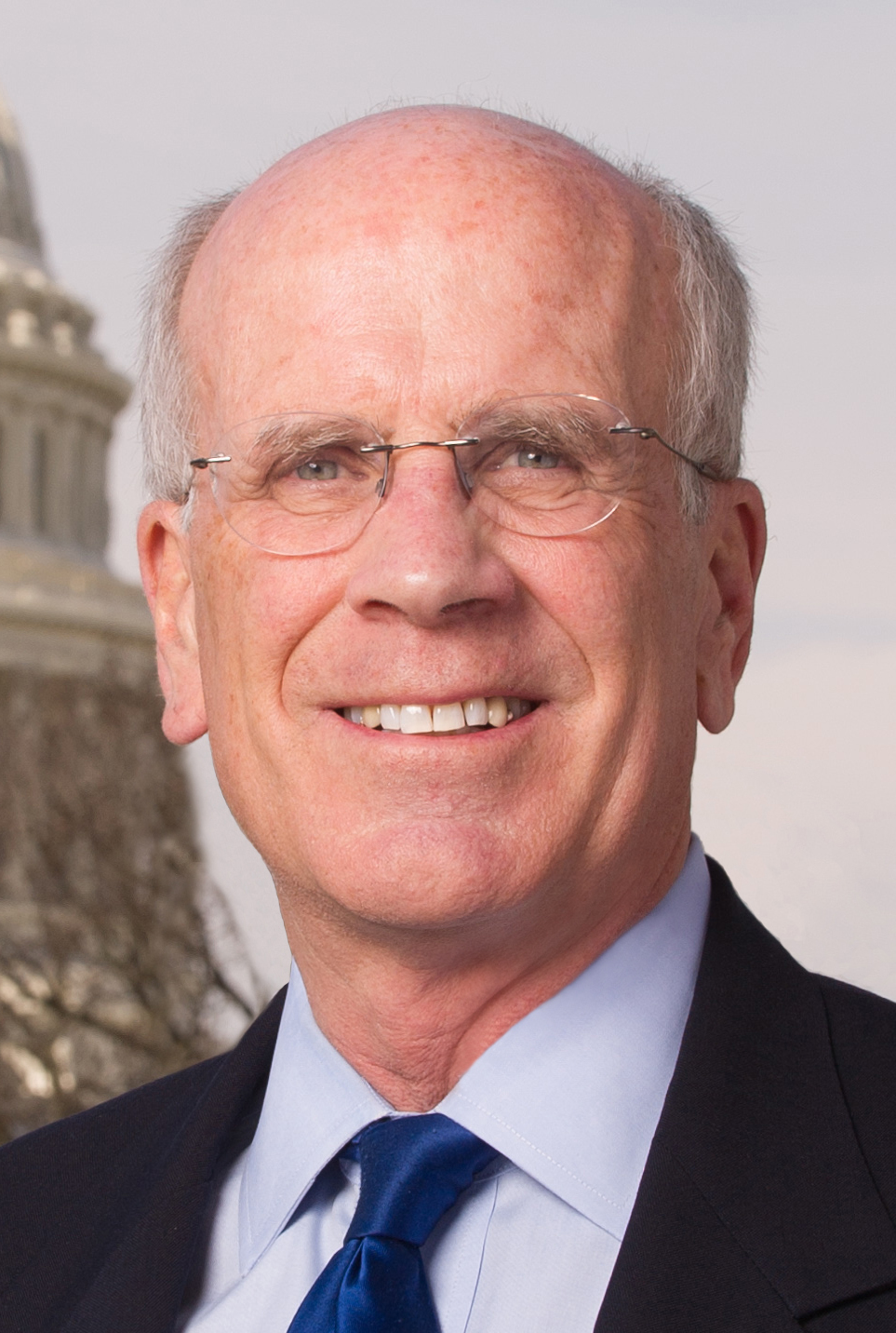

Nominee	Peter Welch	Mark Donka
Party	Democratic	Republican
Popular vote	123,349	59,432
Percentage	64.41%	31.03%
- Welch 30–40% 40–50% 50–60% 60–70% 70–80% 80–90% Donka 40–50% 50–60% No votes
U.S. Representative before election
Peter Welch
Democratic
Elected U.S. Representative
Peter Welch
Democratic

The 2014 United States House of Representatives election in Vermont took place on November 4, 2014, to elect the U.S. representative from Vermont's at-large congressional district, to represent the state of Vermont in the 114th United States Congress.

The election coincided with the election of the Governor of Vermont and other federal and state offices. Incumbent Democratic Congressman Peter Welch was re-elected to a fifth term in office.

== Democratic primary ==
=== Candidates ===
==== Declared ====
- Peter Welch, incumbent representative

=== Results ===
Democratic primary results
Party	Candidate	Votes	%
Democratic	Peter Welch (incumbent)	19,248	98.85
Democratic	Write-in	224	1.15
Total votes		19,472	100

== Republican primary ==
=== Candidates ===
==== Declared ====
- Mark Donka, police officer, former member of the Hartford Board of Selectmen and nominee for the seat in 2012
- Donald W. Nolte
- Donald Russell

=== Results ===
Republican primary results
Party	Candidate	Votes	%
Republican	Mark Donka	4,340	33.67
Republican	Donald Russell	4,026	31.24
Republican	Donald W. Nolte	3,803	29.51
Republican	Write-in	719	5.58
Total votes		12,888	100

== Progressive primary ==
=== Results ===
Progressive primary results
Party	Candidate	Votes	%
Progressive	Write-in	90	100

== Liberty Union primary ==
=== Candidates ===
==== Declared ====
- Matthew Andrews

=== Results ===
Liberty Union primary results
Party	Candidate	Votes	%
Liberty Union	Matthew Andrews	142	95.95
Liberty Union	Write-in	6	4.05
Total votes		148	100

== Independents ==
=== Candidates ===
==== Declared ====
- Cris Ericson, perennial candidate (also ran for Governor)
- Randall Meyer
- Jerry Trudell (Energy Independence), independent candidate for the seat in 2006 and 2008

== General election ==
=== Predictions ===
Source	Ranking	As of
The Cook Political Report	Safe D	November 3, 2014
Rothenberg	Safe D	October 24, 2014
Sabato's Crystal Ball	Safe D	October 30, 2014
RCP	Safe D	November 2, 2014
Daily Kos Elections	Safe D	November 4, 2014

=== Results ===

Vermont's at-large congressional district, 2014
Party	Candidate	Votes	%	±%
Democratic	Peter Welch (incumbent)	123,349	64.41%	−7.60%
Republican	Mark Donka	59,432	31.03%	+7.71%
Independent	Cris Ericson	2,750	1.44%	N/A
Liberty Union	Matthew Andrews	2,071	1.08%	−0.34%
Independent	Jerry Trudell	2,024	1.06%	N/A
Independent	Randall Meyer	1,685	0.88%	N/A
n/a	Write-ins	193	0.10%	N/A
Total votes		'191,504'	'100.0%'	N/A
Democratic hold				

==== By county ====
County	Peter Welch Democratic		Mark Donka Republican		Various candidates Other parties		Margin		Total votes cast
County	#	%	#	%	#	%	#	%	Total votes cast
Addison	8,480	66.2%	3,822	29.8%	507	3.9%	4,658	36.4%	12,809
Bennington	7,077	64.2%	3,228	29.3%	712	6.4%	3,849	34.9%	11,017
Caledonia	4,996	56.6%	3,354	38.0%	473	5.4%	1,642	18.6%	8,823
Chittenden	31,813	67.9%	13,555	28.9%	1,497	3.2%	18,258	39.0%	46,865
Essex	604	47.9%	534	42.3%	123	9.7%	70	5.6%	1,261
Franklin	8,064	60.7%	4,619	34.8%	600	4.5%	3,445	25.9%	13,283
Grand Isle	1,824	62.4%	973	33.3%	124	4.3%	851	29.1%	2,921
Lamoille	4,963	64.7%	2,343	30.6%	359	4.7%	2,620	34.1%	7,665
Orange	5,814	63.7%	2,930	32.1%	378	4.1%	2,884	31.6%	9,122
Orleans	4,477	58.2%	2,736	35.6%	482	6.3%	1,741	22.6%	7,695
Rutland	10,316	58.0%	6,656	37.4%	810	4.6%	3,660	20.6%	17,782
Washington	14,741	69.2%	5,463	25.6%	1,096	5.2%	9,278	43.6%	21,300
Windham	8,866	71.2%	2,880	23.1%	711	5.8%	5,986	47.1%	12,457
Windsor	11,433	64.4%	5,628	31.7%	687	3.8%	5,805	32.7%	17,748
Totals	123,349	64.4%	59,432	31.0%	8,723	4.6%	63,917	33.4%	191,504
