= 2002 Vermont elections =

- November 5, 2002

A general election was held in the U.S. state of Vermont on November 5, 2002. All of Vermont's executive officers were up for election, as well as Vermont's at-large seat in the United States House of Representatives.

== Lieutenant governor ==
2002 Vermont lieutenant gubernatorial election
- November 5, 2002
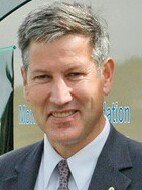

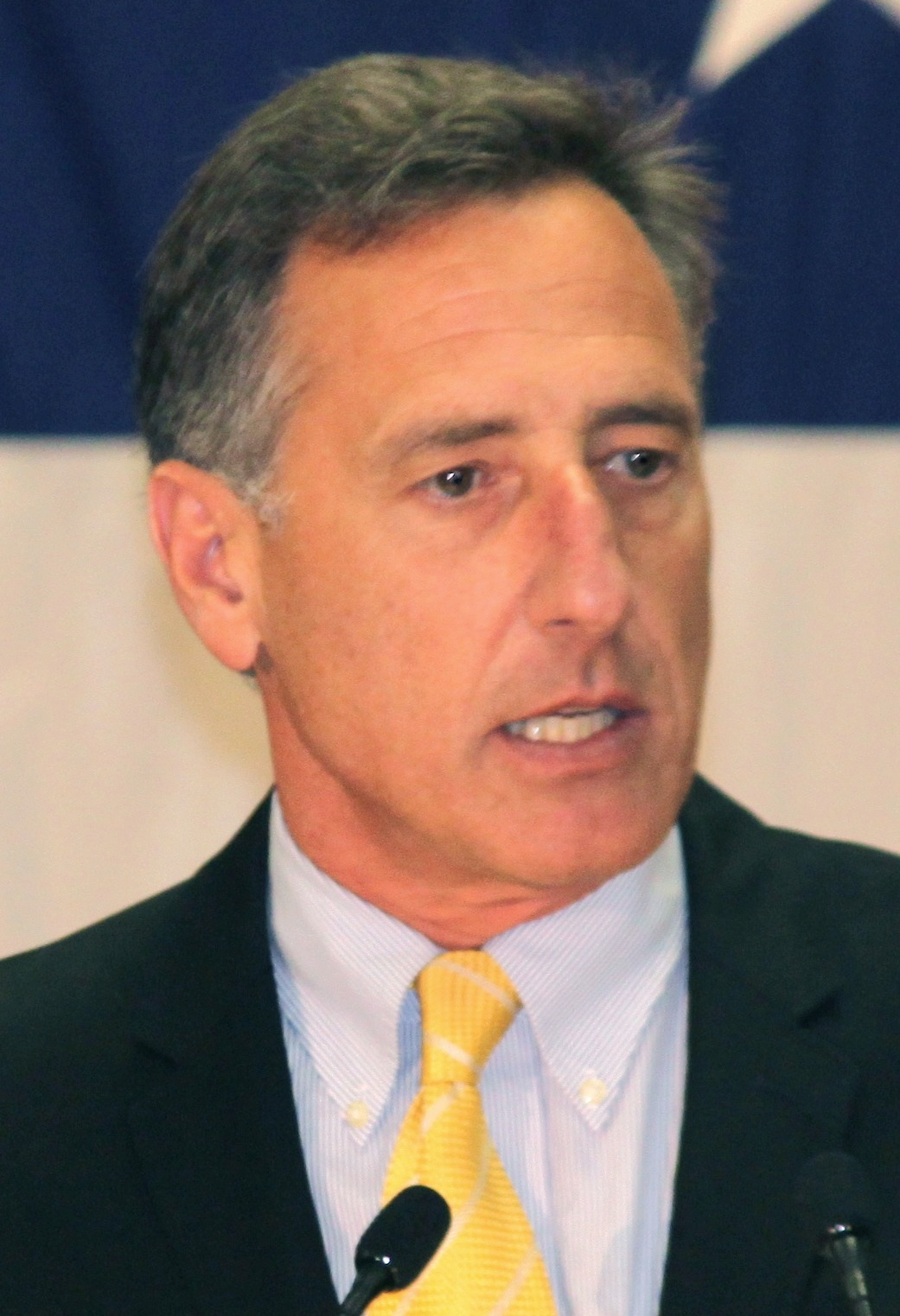

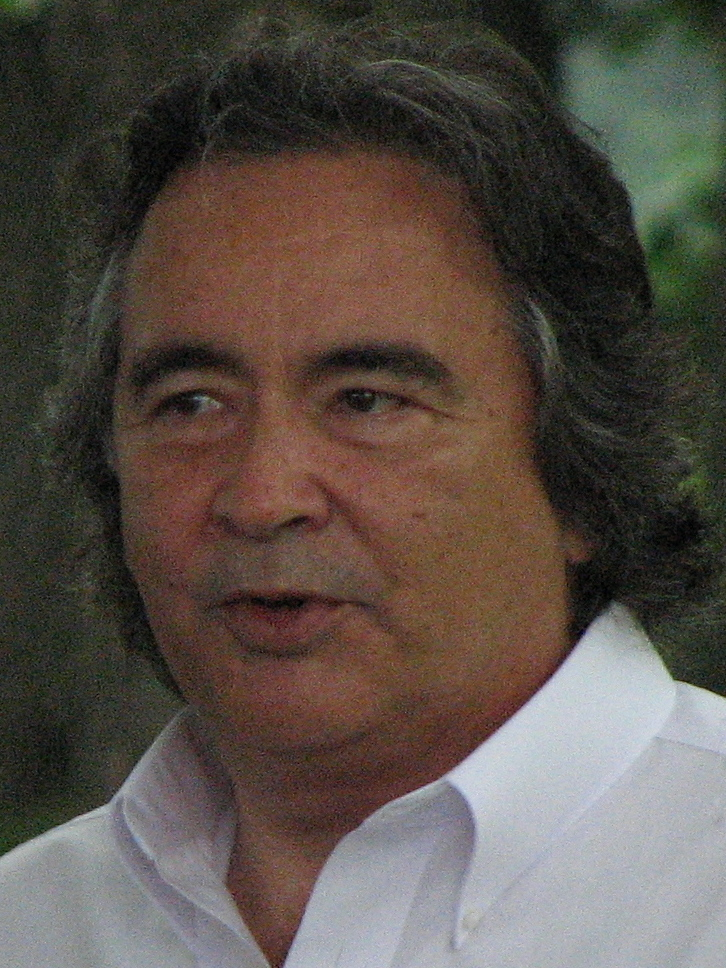
Nominee	Brian Dubie	Peter Shumlin	Anthony Pollina
Party	Republican	Democratic	Progressive
Popular vote	94,044	73,501	56,564
Percentage	41.2%	32.2%	24.8%
- Dubie: 30-40% 40-50% 50-60% 60-70% >90% Shumlin: 30-40% 40-50% 50-60% Pollina: 30-40% 40-50% 50-60% Jones: 40-50% No Data
Lieutenant Governor before election
Doug Racine
Democratic
Elected Lieutenant Governor
Brian E. Dubie
Republican

Incumbent Democratic lieutenant governor Doug Racine (since 1997) did not run again for a fourth term, instead ran for governor.

=== Republican primary ===
Brian E. Dubie was unopposed in the Republican primary. He previously ran for lieutenant governor as the Republican nominee in 2000.

Republican primary results
Party	Candidate	Votes	%
Republican	Brian E. Dubie	22,584	100.0
Total votes		22,584	100%

=== Democratic primary ===
State Senator Peter Shumlin was unopposed in the Democratic primary.

==== Candidates ====
- Peter Shumlin, member of the Vermont Senate from Windham County (1993-2003), Member of the Vermont House of Representatives (1990-1993)

Democratic primary results
Party	Candidate	Votes	%
Democratic	Peter Shumlin	22,633	100.0
Total votes		22,633	100%

=== Progressive primary ===
Anthony Pollina, Progressive nominee for Governor in 2000 and U.S. Representative in 1984, ran unopposed in the Progressive primary.

Progressive primary results
Party	Candidate	Votes	%
Progressive	Anthony Pollina	1,664	100.0
Total votes		1,664	100%

=== Grassroots nomination ===
Sally Ann Jones, activist, ran unopposed for the Grassroots State Committee's nomination.

=== General election ===
==== Candidates ====
- Brian E. Dubie (R)
- Sally Ann Jones (GR)
- Anthony Pollina (P)
- Peter Shumlin (D)

==== Results ====
2002 Vermont lieutenant gubernatorial election
Party	Candidate	Votes	%	±%
Republican	Brian E. Dubie	94,044	41.2	−0.01
Democratic	Peter Shumlin	73,501	32.2	−21.1
Progressive	Anthony Pollina	56,564	24.8	+24.8
Grassroots	Sally Ann Jones	4,310	1.9	−1.2
Write-in	Write-ins	116	0.01	n/a
Total votes		228,535	100%	
Republican gain from Democratic		Swing	+21.0	

== Secretary of State ==
2002 Vermont secretary of state election
- November 5, 2002
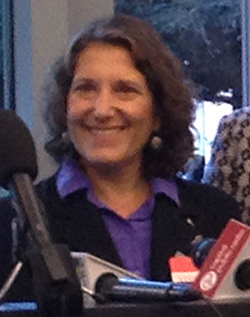

Nominee	Deborah Markowitz	Michael S. Bertrand
Party	Democratic	Republican
Popular vote	131,469	82,905
Percentage	58.8%	37.1%
- Markowitz: 40–50% 50–60% 60–70% 70–80% 80–90% Bertrand: 40–50% 50–60% 60–70% 70–80% No Data/Vote
Secretary of State before election
Deborah Markowitz
Democratic
Elected Secretary of State
Deborah Markowitz
Democratic

Incumbent Democratic Secretary of State Deborah Markowitz (since 1999) ran again for a third term.

=== Democratic primary ===
Markowitz ran unopposed in the Democratic primary.

Democratic primary results
Party	Candidate	Votes	%
Democratic	Deborah Markowitz	25,737	100.0
Total votes		25,737	100%

=== Republican primary ===
Bertrand ran unopposed in the Republican primary.

Republican primary results
Party	Candidate	Votes	%
Republican	Michael S. Bertrand	20,740	100.0
Total votes		20,740	100%

=== Progressive primary ===
Markowitz also ran unopposed in the Progressive primary as a write-in candidate.

Progressive primary results
Party	Candidate	Votes	%
Progressive	Deborah Markowitz (write-in)	258	100.0
Total votes		258	100%

=== Liberty Union nomination ===
Leslie Yvonne Scaffidi, Liberty Union nominee for Secretary of State in 2000, ran unopposed for the Liberty Union State Committee's nomination.

=== Grassroots nomination ===
Tina M. Thompson ran unopposed for the Grassroots State Committee's nomination.

=== General election ===
==== Candidates ====
- Michael S. Bertrand (R)
- Deborah Markowitz (D)
- Leslie Yvonne Scaffidi (LU)
- Tina M. Thompson (GR)

==== Results ====
2002 Vermont Secretary of State election
Party	Candidate	Votes	%	±%
Democratic	Deborah Markowitz (incumbent)	131,469	58.8	−2.5
Republican	Michael S. Bertrand	82,905	37.1	+0.5
Grassroots	Tina M. Thompson	7,166	3.2	+3.2
Liberty Union	Leslie Yvonne Scaffidi	1,968	0.9	−1.1
Write-in	Write-ins	113	0.01	n/a
Total votes		223,621	100%	
Democratic hold		Swing	-2.5	

== Treasurer ==
2002 Vermont treasurer election
- November 5, 2002
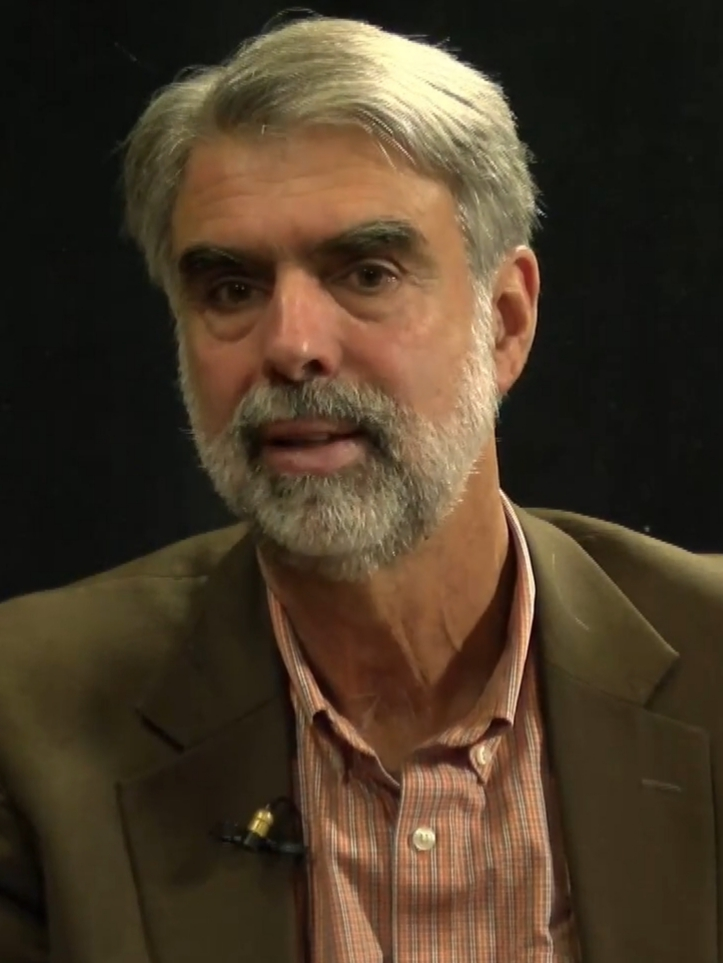

Nominee	Jeb Spaulding	John V. Labarge	Claude Bouchard
Party	Democratic	Republican	Grassroots
Popular vote	127,459	82,905	10,757
Percentage	57.2%	37.1%	4.9%
- Spaulding: 40–50% 50–60% 60–70% 70–80% Labarge: 40–50% 50–60% 60–70% 70–80% No Data/Vote
Treasurer before election
Jim Douglas
Republican
Elected Treasurer
Jeb Spaulding
Democratic

Incumbent Republican treasurer Jim Douglas (since 1995) did not run again for a fifth term, instead ran for governor.

=== Democratic primary ===
==== Candidates ====
- Ed Flanagan, Democratic nominee for U.S. Senate in 2000
- Jeb Spaulding, Member of the Vermont Senate (1985-2001)

==== Results ====
Democratic primary results
Party	Candidate	Votes	%
Democratic	Jeb Spaulding	19,090	66.1
Democratic	Ed Flanagan	9,620	0.74
Democratic	Write-ins	178	0.6
Total votes		28,888	100%

=== Republican primary ===
John V. Labarge, Member of the Vermont House of Representatives (1993-2003), ran unopposed in the Republican primary.

Republican primary results
Party	Candidate	Votes	%
Republican	John V. Labarge	20,505	100.0
Total votes		20,505	100%

=== Liberty Union nomination ===
Jerry Levy, Liberty Union nominee for U.S. Senate in 2000, 1998, 1994, 1992, 1988, 1986, and 1982, Vermont Secretary of State in 1984, and auditor in 1980, ran unopposed for the Liberty Union State Committee's nomination.

=== Grassroots nomination ===
Claude Bouchard, Republican candidate for State Representative from Franklin-3 in the 2002 primary, ran unopposed for the Grassroots State Committee's nomination.

=== General election ===
==== Candidates ====
- John V. Labarge (R)
- Jerry Levy (LU)
- Jeb Spaulding (D)
- Claude Bouchard (GR)

==== Results ====
2002 Vermont treasurer election
Party	Candidate	Votes	%	±%
Democratic	Jeb Spaulding	127,459	57.2	+57.2
Republican	John V. Labarge	80,229	36.0	−50.1
Grassroots	Claude Bouchard	10,757	4.9	−8.8
Liberty Union	Jerry Levy	4,199	1.9	+1.9
Write-in	Write-ins	154	0.1	n/a
Total votes		222,798	100%	
Democratic gain from Republican		Swing	+64.9	

== Attorney General ==
2002 Vermont attorney general election
- November 5, 2002

Nominee	William H. Sorrell	Larry Drown	Cindy Hill
Party	Democratic	Republican	Progressive
Popular vote	125,495	67,360	16,152
Percentage	56.6%	30.4%	7.3%
- Sorrell: 30–40% 40–50% 50–60% 60–70% 70–80% Drown: 40–50% 50–60% 60–70% 70–80% No Data/Vote
Attorney General before election
William H. Sorrell
Democratic
Elected Attorney General
William H. Sorrell
Democratic

Incumbent Attorney General William H. Sorrell (since 1997) ran again for a fourth term.

=== Democratic primary ===
Sorrell was unopposed in the Democratic primary.

Democratic primary results
Party	Candidate	Votes	%
Democratic	William H. Sorrell	24,693	100.0
Total votes		24,693	100%

=== Republican primary ===
Larry Drown, Republican nominee for Secretary of State in 2000, Democratic nominee for State Representative from Washington-1 in 1998, and Reform Party nominee for State Senator from Washington County in 1996, ran unopposed in the Republican primary.

Republican primary results
Party	Candidate	Votes	%
Republican	Larry Drown	19,629	100.0
Total votes		19,629	100%

=== Progressive primary ===
==== Candidates ====
- Cindy Hill, candidate for Attorney General in 1998
- Boots Wardinski, Liberty Union nominee for State Representative in 2000, 1998, 1996, and for State Senator in 1992 and 1990, farmer

==== Results ====
Progressive primary results
Party	Candidate	Votes	%
Progressive	Cindy Hill	1,089	73.6
Progressive	Boots Wardinski	320	21.6
Progressive	Write-ins	71	4.8
Total votes		1,480	100%

=== Liberty Union nomination ===
After losing the Progressive primary, Boots Wardinski ran unopposed for the Liberty Union State Committee's nomination.

=== Libertarian nomination ===
Christopher Costanzo, Libertarian nominee for State Senator in 2000, for Attorney General in 1998, and for Secretary of State in 1996, ran unopposed for the Libertarian State Committee's nomination.

=== Grassroots nomination ===
Mann Ward ran unopposed for the Grassroots State Committee's nomination.

=== General election ===
==== Candidates ====
- Christopher Costanzo (L)
- Larry Drown (R)
- Cindy Hill (P)
- William H. Sorrell (D)
- Boots Wardinski (LU)
- Mann Ward (GR)

==== Results ====
2002 Vermont attorney general election
Party	Candidate	Votes	%	±%
Democratic	William H. Sorrell (incumbent)	125,495	56.6	−27.4
Republican	Larry Drown	67,360	30.4	+30.4
Progressive	Cindy Hill	16,152	7.3	+7.3
Grassroots	Mann Ward	6,307	2.8	−11.9
Libertarian	Christopher Costanzo	3,991	1.8	+1.8
Liberty Union	Boots Wardinski	2,243	1.0	+1.0
Write-in	Write-ins	131	0.1	n/a
Total votes		221,679	100%	
Democratic hold		Swing	-27.4	

== Auditor of Accounts ==
2002 Vermont Auditor of Accounts election
- November 5, 2002

Nominee	Elizabeth M. Ready	Bruce Hyde
Party	Democratic	Republican
Popular vote	113,240	93,342
Percentage	51.3%	42.3%
- Ready: 40–50% 50–60% 60–70% 70–80% Hyde: 40–50% 50–60% 60–70% 70–80% No Data/Vote
Auditor of Accounts before election
Elizabeth M. Ready
Democratic
Elected Auditor of Accounts
Elizabeth M. Ready
Democratic

Incumbent Democratic Auditor Elizabeth M. Ready (since 2001) ran again for a second term.

=== Democratic primary ===
Ready ran unopposed in the Democratic primary.

Democratic primary results
Party	Candidate	Votes	%
Democratic	Elizabeth M. Ready	24,149	100.0
Total votes		24,149	100%

=== Republican primary ===
Bruce Hyde, former State Representative (1995-2001), ran unopposed in the Republican primary.

Republican primary results
Party	Candidate	Votes	%
Republican	Bruce Hyde	20,506	100.0
Total votes		20,506	100%

=== Liberty Union nomination ===
Murray Ngoima, Liberty Union nominee for Lieutenant Governor in 1996 and for Treasurer in 1994, 1992, and 1990, ran unopposed for the Liberty Union State Committee's nomination.

=== Libertarian nomination ===
Dennis Lane, Libertarian nominee for Secretary of State in 1998, and Grassroots nominee for Governor in 1996 and 1994, ran unopposed for the Libertarian State Committee's nomination.

=== Grassroots nomination ===
Lynn Appleby ran unopposed for the Grassroots State Committee's nomination.

=== General election ===
==== Candidates ====
- Lynn Appleby (GR)
- Bruce Hyde (R)
- Dennis Lane (L)
- Murray Ngoima (LU)
- Elizabeth M. Ready (D)

==== Results ====
2002 Vermont Auditor of Accounts election
Party	Candidate	Votes	%	±%
Democratic	Elizabeth M. Ready (incumbent)	113,240	51.3	−2.5
Republican	Bruce Hyde	93,342	42.3	+0.3
Grassroots	Lynn Appleby	8,172	3.7	+3.7
Libertarian	Dennis Lane	3,676	1.7	−0.9
Liberty Union	Murray Ngoima	2,036	1.0	−0.6
Write-in	Write-ins	189	0.1	n/a
Total votes		220,655	100%	
Democratic hold		Swing	-2.5	
