= Addison County Independent =

Weekly newspaper in Vermont, US

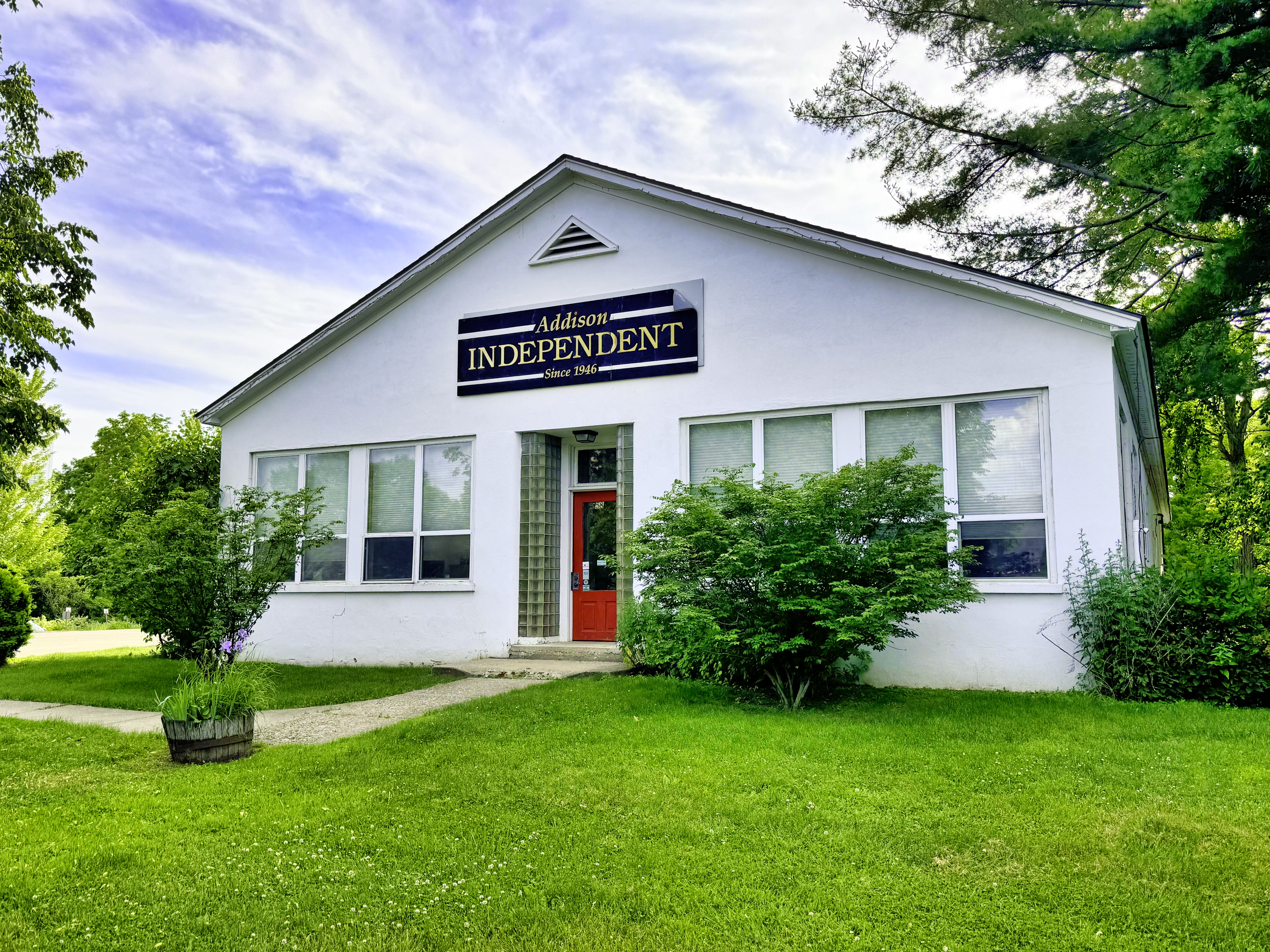
- Addison County Independent office in Middlebury
- Type: Weekly newspaper
- Format: Broadsheet
- Owner: Angelo Lynn
- Publisher: Angelo Lynn
- Editor: John McCright
- Founded: 1946
- Headquarters: Middlebury, Vermont
- OCLC number: 38158604
- Website: addisonindependent.com

The Addison County Independent is a weekly newspaper located in Middlebury, Vermont that covers Addison County. The paper was founded in 1946 as the Addison Independent and is now owned and published by Angelo Lynn. The paper is a member of the New England Newspapers and Press Association (NENPA). The paper won the NENPA Better Newspaper Competition first place award for general excellence in its class from the association in 2015, 2023, and 2025. The paper is published weekly on Thursdays.

== History ==
The Addison Independent was founded in 1946 by William J. Slator and his wife Celine. At the time they owned Addison Press, Inc. which published the paper as well as served a commercial printing plant. In 1955 the newspaper name changed to The Addison County Independent.

In 1976 William J. Slator sold the Addison County Independent to Gordon T. Mills, who was the editor for the Burlington Free Press.

In 1984 the current owner, Angelo Lynn, purchased the paper. In 1988, Lynn changed the publication schedule to twice-weekly, which continued until April 2020 when it shifted to weekly publication during the COVID-19 pandemic.

== Coverage area ==
The Addison County Independent mostly reports on news in Addison County, however some news is included from Rutland County, particularly school news related to Otter Valley Union High School.
