= 2002 United States House of Representatives election in Vermont =

2002 United States House of Representatives election in Vermont's at-large district
- November 5, 2002
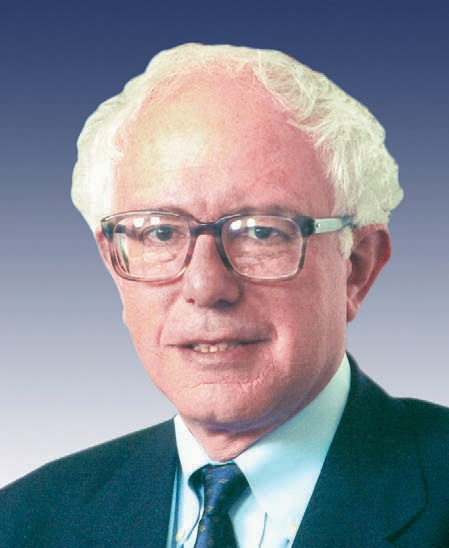

Nominee	Bernie Sanders	Bill Meub
Party	Independent	Republican
Alliance	Democratic
Popular vote	144,880	72,813
Percentage	64.26%	32.29%
- Sanders: 40–50% 50–60% 60–70% 70–80% 80–90% Meub: 40–50% 50–60% 60–70%
U.S. Representative before election
Bernie Sanders
Independent
Elected U.S. Representative
Bernie Sanders
Independent

The 2002 United States House of Representatives election in Vermont was held on Tuesday, November 5, 2002, to elect the U.S. representative from the state's at-large congressional district. The election coincided with the elections of other federal and state offices.

Incumbent Independent Bernie Sanders won re-election, defeating Republican candidate Bill Meub by 32 points.

== Democratic primary ==
Democratic primary results
Party	Candidate	Votes	%
Democratic	Bernie Sanders (Write-in) (incumbent)	2,583	65.15
Democratic	Write-ins	1,382	34.85
Total votes		3,965	100.00

== Republican primary ==
=== Candidates ===
- Karen Ann Kerin, lawyer, engineer and nominee for VT-AL in 2000
- Bill Meub, lawyer and candidate for Governor of Vermont in 2000
- Greg Parke, retired United States Air Force lieutenant colonel

=== Endorsements ===
Bill Meub

Newspapers and publications

- Bennington Banner (primary only)
Greg Parke

Organizations

- National Right to Life Committee

=== Results ===
Republican primary results
Party	Candidate	Votes	%
Republican	William "Bill" Meub	14,105	57.23
Republican	Greg Parke	5,467	22.18
Republican	Karen Ann Kerin	4,643	18.84
Republican	Write-ins	431	1.75
Total votes		24,646	100.00

== Progressive primary ==
Progressive primary results
Party	Candidate	Votes	%
Progressive	Jane Newton	957	68.85
Progressive	Write-ins	433	31.15
Total votes		1,390	100.00

== General election ==
Meub was considered a moderate Republican, portraying himself as pro-choice and pro-business, and attacking incumbent representative Sanders for being a democratic socialist. Sanders nonetheless easily won re-election.

=== Predictions ===
Source	Ranking	As of
Sabato's Crystal Ball	Solid I	November 4, 2002
New York Times	Solid I	October 14, 2002

=== Endorsements ===
Bill Meub (R)

Individuals

- Steve Schmidt, communications director for the National Republican Congressional Committee
Bernie Sanders (I)

Newspapers and publications

- Brattleboro Reformer

=== Results ===
Vermont's at-large congressional district election, 2002
Party	Candidate	Votes	%
Independent	Bernie Sanders (incumbent)	144,880	64.26%
Republican	William "Bill" Meub	72,813	32.29%
Liberty Union/Progressive	Jane Newton	3,185	1.41%
Grassroots	Fawn Skinner	2,344	1.04%
Libertarian	Daniel H. Krymkowski	2,033	0.90%
Write-ins	N/A	221	0.10%
Total votes		225,476	100.00
Independent hold			

==== Results by county ====
County	Bernie Sanders Independent		Bill Meub Republican		Various candidates		Margin		Total
County	#	%	#	%	#	%	#	%	Total
Addison	9,768	65.9%	4,322	29.2%	735	4.9%	5,446	46.7%	14,825
Bennington	7,212	56.0%	5,091	39.5%	573	4.5%	2,121	16.5%	12,876
Caledonia	5,740	58.9%	3,699	38.0%	301	3.1%	2,041	20.9%	9,740
Chittenden	36,625	66.1%	17,500	31.6%	1,288	2.3%	19,125	34.5%	55,413
Essex	1,117	56.4%	708	35.8%	155	7.9%	409	22.6%	1,980
Franklin	9,734	66.9%	4,495	30.9%	328	2.3%	5,239	39.0%	14,557
Grand Isle	2,025	64.9%	1,029	33.0%	67	2.0%	996	31.9%	3,121
Lamoille	6,068	68.6%	2,587	29.2%	193	2.1%	3,481	39.4%	8,848
Orange	7,187	64.9%	3,538	32.0%	348	3.1%	3,649	32.9%	11,073
Orleans	5,970	66.9%	2,669	29.9%	289	3.3%	3,301	37.0%	8,928
Rutland	12,121	54.7%	9,453	42.7%	573	2.7%	2,668	12.0%	22,147
Washington	16,605	68.7%	6,913	28.6%	649	2.7%	9,692	40.1%	24,167
Windham	10,404	62.8%	4,598	27.7%	1,574	9.4%	5,806	35.1%	16,576
Windsor	14,304	67.4%	6,211	29.3%	710	3.4%	8,093	38.1%	21,225
Totals	144,880	64.3%	72,813	32.3%	7,783	3.4%	72,067	32.0%	225,476
