= 2016 United States House of Representatives election in Vermont =

2016 United States House of Representatives election in Vermont's at-large district
- November 8, 2016
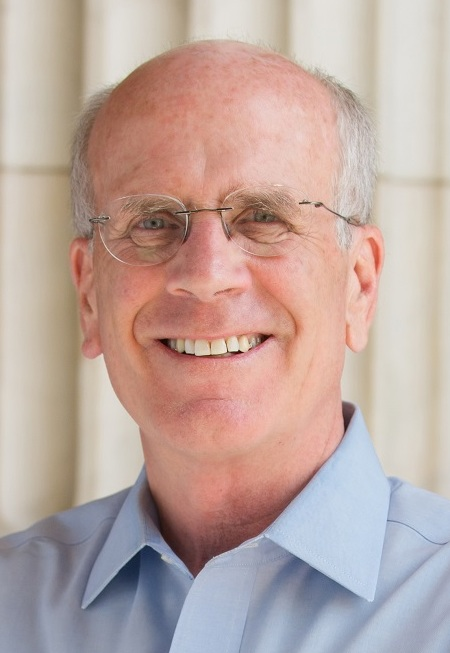

Nominee	Peter Welch	Erica Clawson
Party	Democratic	Liberty Union
Alliance	Republican
Popular vote	264,414	29,410
Percentage	89.53%	9.96%
- Welch: 60–70% 70–80% 80–90% >90%
U.S. Representative before election
Peter Welch
Democratic
Elected U.S. Representative
Peter Welch
Democratic

The 2016 United States House of Representatives election in Vermont was held on November 8, 2016, to elect the U.S. representative from the state of Vermont from Vermont's at-large congressional district. The election coincided with the 2016 U.S. presidential election, as well as other elections to the House of Representatives, elections to the United States Senate and various state and local elections. The primaries were held on August 9.

Peter Welch, a Democrat who was first elected in 2006, announced he would run for reelection, rather than run for Governor of Vermont. Welch faced no opposition in the Democratic primary, and also won the Republican primary on write-in votes; Welch accepted both nominations. Welch was re-elected with 89.5% of the vote, with Erica Clawson of the Liberty Union Party receiving 10%.

== Democratic primary ==
=== Candidates ===
==== Declared ====
- Peter Welch, incumbent U.S. Representative

=== Results ===
Democratic primary results
Party	Candidate	Votes	%
Democratic	Peter Welch (incumbent)	67,285	91.97
Democratic	Write-in	345	0.47
Democratic	Spoiled votes	122	0.17
Democratic	Blank votes	5,410	7.39
Total votes		73,162	100

== Republican primary ==
=== Candidates ===
==== Declared ====
- None

=== Results ===
Republican primary results
Party	Candidate	Votes	%
Republican	Peter Welch (write-in)	2,093	4.51
Republican	Write-in	1,335	2.88
Republican	Spoiled votes	548	1.18
Republican	Blank votes	42,418	91.43
Total votes		46,394	100

== Liberty Union primary ==
=== Candidates ===
==== Declared ====
- Erica Clawson

== General election ==
=== Predictions ===
Source	Ranking	As of
The Cook Political Report	Safe D	November 7, 2016
Daily Kos Elections	Safe D	November 7, 2016
Rothenberg	Safe D	November 3, 2016
Sabato's Crystal Ball	Safe D	November 7, 2016
RCP	Safe D	October 31, 2016

=== Results ===
2016 Vermont's at-large congressional district election
Party	Candidate	Votes	%	±%
Democratic/Republican	Peter Welch (incumbent)	264,414	89.53	+25.12
Liberty Union	Erica Clawson	29,410	9.96	+8.88
Write-in		1,510	0.51	+0.41
Total votes		295,334	100.0	
Democratic hold				

==== By county ====
County	Peter Welch Democratic/Republican		Erica Clawson Liberty Union		Various candidates Other parties		Margin		Total votes cast
County	#	%	#	%	#	%	#	%	Total votes cast
Addison	16,228	90.2%	1,683	9.4%	82	0.5%	14,545	80.8%	17,993
Bennington	14,226	88.8%	1,734	10.8%	62	0.4%	12,492	78.0%	16,022
Caledonia	11,567	87.4%	1,592	12.0%	74	0.6%	9,975	75.4%	13,233
Chittenden	70,924	91.3%	6,340	8.2%	415	0.5%	64,584	83.1%	77,679
Essex	2,265	83.8%	423	15.7%	14	0.5%	1,842	68.1%	2,702
Franklin	18,078	88.6%	2,207	10.8%	125	0.6%	15,871	77.8%	20,410
Grand Isle	3,455	88.4%	435	11.1%	20	0.5%	3,020	77.3%	3,910
Lamoille	10,879	90.3%	1,111	9.2%	63	0.5%	9,768	81.1%	12,053
Orange	12,212	88.5%	1,522	11.0%	66	0.5%	10,690	77.5%	13,800
Orleans	9,695	86.4%	1,480	13.2%	49	0.4%	8,215	73.2%	11,224
Rutland	24,342	88.2%	3,061	11.1%	197	0.7%	21,281	77.1%	27,600
Washington	26,545	90.2%	2,752	9.3%	148	0.5%	23,793	80.9%	29,445
Windham	18,843	89.7%	2,095	10.0%	67	0.3%	16,748	79.7%	21,005
Windsor	25,155	89.0%	2,975	10.5%	128	0.5%	22,180	78.5%	28,258
Totals	264,414	89.53%	29,410	9.96%	1,510	0.51%	295,334	79.57%	295,334
