= 2024 United States House of Representatives election in Vermont =

2024 United States House of Representatives election in Vermont's at-large district
- November 5, 2024
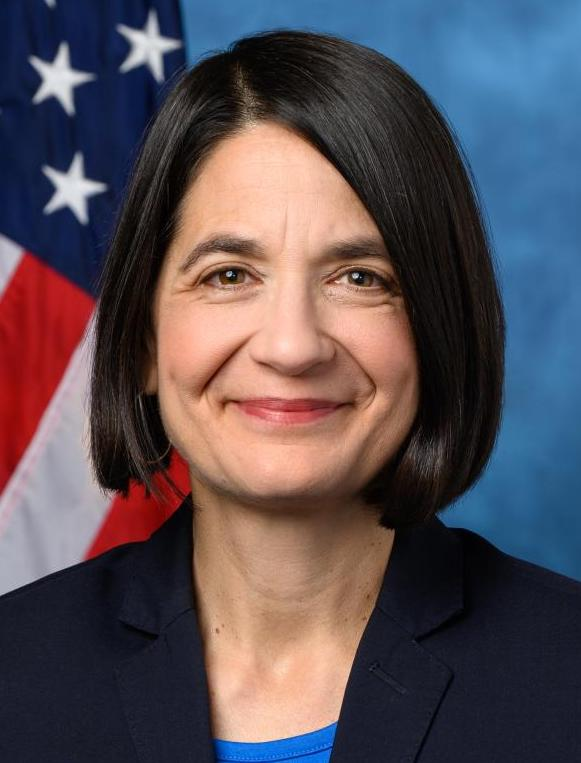

Candidate	Becca Balint	Mark Coester	Adam Ortiz
Party	Democratic	Republican	Independent
Alliance		Libertarian
Popular vote	218,398	104,451	19,286
Percentage	62.29%	29.79%	5.50%
- Balint: 40–50% 50–60% 60–70% 70–80% 80–90% Coester: 40–50% 50–60% No votes
U.S. Representative before election
Becca Balint
Democratic
Elected U.S. Representative
Becca Balint
Democratic

The 2024 United States House of Representatives election in Vermont was held on November 5, 2024, to elect a member of the United States House of Representatives to represent Vermont's at-large district. Democrat incumbent Becca Balint was re-elected to a second term, defeating Republican truck driver Mark Coester and independent Adam Ortiz.

Primary elections took place on August 13, 2024.

== Democratic primary ==
=== Candidates ===
==== Nominee ====
- Becca Balint, incumbent U.S. representative (2023–present)

=== Endorsements ===
Becca Balint

Organizations

- Bend the Arc
- Human Rights Campaign
- Humane Society Legislative Fund
- J Street PAC
- Jewish Democratic Council of America
- Joint Action Committee for Political Affairs
- League of Conservation Voters
- LGBTQ Victory Fund
- LPAC
- Population Connection Action Fund
- Vote Mama

Labor unions

- National Education Association

Individuals

- Kelley Robinson, president of Human Rights Campaign

==== Results ====
Democratic primary results
Party	Candidate	Votes	%
Democratic	Becca Balint (incumbent)	47,638	100.0
Total votes		47,638	100.0

== Republican primary ==
=== Candidates ===
==== Nominee ====
- Mark Coester, truck driver and independent candidate for U.S. Senate in 2022

==== Results ====
Republican primary results
Party	Candidate	Votes	%
Republican	Mark Coester	19,459	100.0
Total votes		19,459	100.0

== Green Mountain Peace and Justice Party ==
=== Candidates ===
==== Nominee ====
- Jill "Jessy" Diamondstone, massage therapist and nominee for state treasurer in 2012

== Independents ==
=== Candidates ===
==== Declared ====
- Adam Ortiz, window installation contractor and candidate for U.S. House in 2022

== General election ==
=== Predictions ===
Source	Ranking	As of
The Cook Political Report	Solid D	July 28, 2023
Inside Elections	Solid D	July 28, 2023
Sabato's Crystal Ball	Safe D	June 8, 2023
Elections Daily	Safe D	June 8, 2023
CNalysis	Solid D	November 16, 2023

=== Polling ===
Poll source	Date(s) administered	Sample size (Note: Key: A – all adults RV – registered voters LV – likely voters V – unclear)	Margin of error	Becca Balint (D)	Mark Coester (R)	Other	Undecided
University of New Hampshire	October 29 – November 2, 2024	1,167 (LV)	± 2.9%	62%	22%	1% (Note: Diamondstone (GMPJP) with 1%)	14%
University of New Hampshire	August 15–19, 2024	924 (LV)	± 3.2%	61%	24%	2% (Note: "Other (Another Third Party/Write-In)" and Diamondstone (GMPJP) with 1%; Ortiz (I) with 0%)	13%

=== Results ===

2024 Vermont's at-large congressional district election
Party	Candidate	Votes	%	±%
Democratic	Becca Balint (incumbent)	218,398	62.29%	+1.84
Republican	Mark Coester	104,451	29.79%	+2.94
Independent	Adam Ortiz	19,286	5.50%	+4.34
Green Mountain Peace and Justice	Jessy Diamondstone	7,552	2.15%	N/A
Write-in		929	0.25%	–0.09
Total votes		350,616	100.0%	
Democratic hold				

==== By county ====
By county

County	Becca Balint Democratic		Mark Coester Republican		Various candidates Other parties	
County	#	%	#	%	#	%
Addison	13,845	63.8%	6,406	29.5%	1,461	6.8%
Bennington	11,499	59.4%	5,996	31.0%	1,869	9.6%
Caledonia	8,291	52.5%	5,800	36.7%	1,698	10.7%
Chittenden	67,698	73.5%	19,012	20.6%	5,389	5.8%
Essex	1,253	39.3%	1,439	45.1%	500	15.6%
Franklin	12,208	48.0%	10,825	42.5%	2,418	9.5%
Grand Isle	2,736	57.0%	1,718	35.8%	345	7.2%
Lamoille	8,784	62.3%	4,176	29.6%	1,134	8.1%
Orange	9,491	56.3%	5,941	35.2%	1,430	8.5%
Orleans	6,328	45.3%	5,449	39.0%	2,177	15.6%
Rutland	15,948	49.4%	13,668	42.3%	2,675	8.3%
Washington	22,786	67.5%	8,562	25.4%	2,409	7.1%
Windham	16,897	68.4%	5,963	24.1%	1,834	7.5%
Windsor	20,634	63.4%	9,496	29.2%	2,428	7.5%
Totals	218,398	62.3%	104,451	29.8%	27,767	7.5%
