= 1984 United States House of Representatives election in Vermont =

1984 United States House of Representatives election in Vermont's at-large district
- November 6, 1984
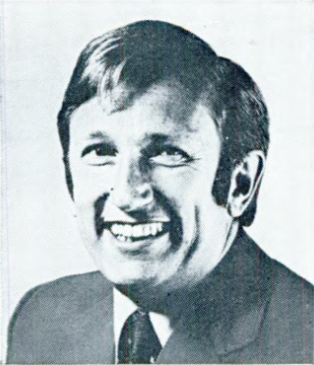

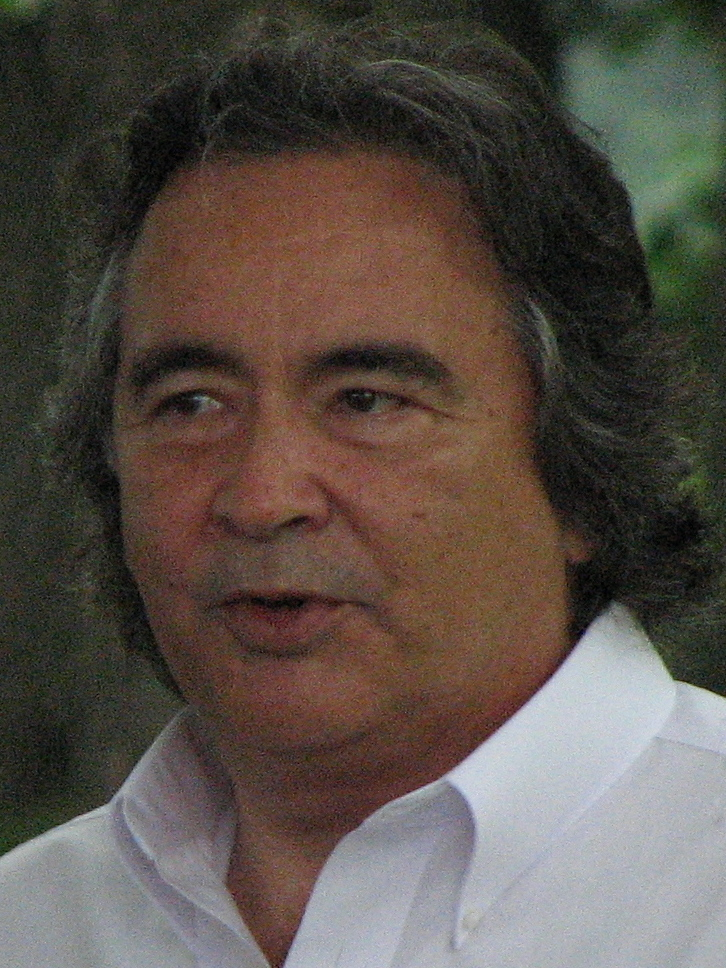
Nominee	Jim Jeffords	Anthony Pollina
Party	Republican	Democratic
Popular vote	148,025	60,360
Percentage	65.41%	26.67%
- County results Jeffords: 50–60% 60–70% 70–80%
U.S. Representative before election
Jim Jeffords
Republican
Elected U.S. Representative
Jim Jeffords
Republican

The 1984 United States House of Representatives election in Vermont was held on Tuesday, November 6, 1984, to elect the U.S. representative from the state's at-large congressional district. The election coincided with the elections of other federal and state offices, including the concurrent presidential election.

Incumbent representative Jim Jeffords won re-election to a 6th term with 65.41% of the vote. Democratic candidate Anthony Pollina won just 26.67% of the vote. This was Jeffords's closest election since 1974.

== Democratic primary ==
Democratic primary results
Party	Candidate	Votes	%
Democratic	Anthony Pollina	6,502	43.88
Democratic	John F. Tatro	4,043	27.29
Democratic	Paul Forlenza	3,603	24.32
Democratic	Write-in	669	4.52
Total votes		14,817	100.00

== Republican primary ==
Republican primary results
Party	Candidate	Votes	%
Republican	Jim Jeffords	35,205	72.10
Republican	Mike Jacobs	13,455	27.56
Republican	Write-in	166	0.34
Total votes		48,826	100.00

== Liberty Union primary ==
Liberty Union primary results
Party	Candidate	Votes	%
Liberty Union	Peter Diamondstone	226	92.62
Liberty Union	Write-in	18	7.38
Total votes		244	100.00

== General election ==
Vermont's at-large congressional district election, 1984
Party	Candidate	Votes	%
Republican	Jim Jeffords	148,025	65.41
Democratic	Anthony Pollina	60,360	26.67
Libertarian	Jim Hedbor	9,359	4.14
Liberty Union	Annette Larson	4,858	2.15
Independent	Morris Earle	3,313	1.46
Write-ins	N/A	382	0.17
Total votes		226,297	100.00
Republican hold			
