= 2010 United States House of Representatives election in Vermont =

2010 United States House of Representatives election in Vermont's at-large district
- November 2, 2010
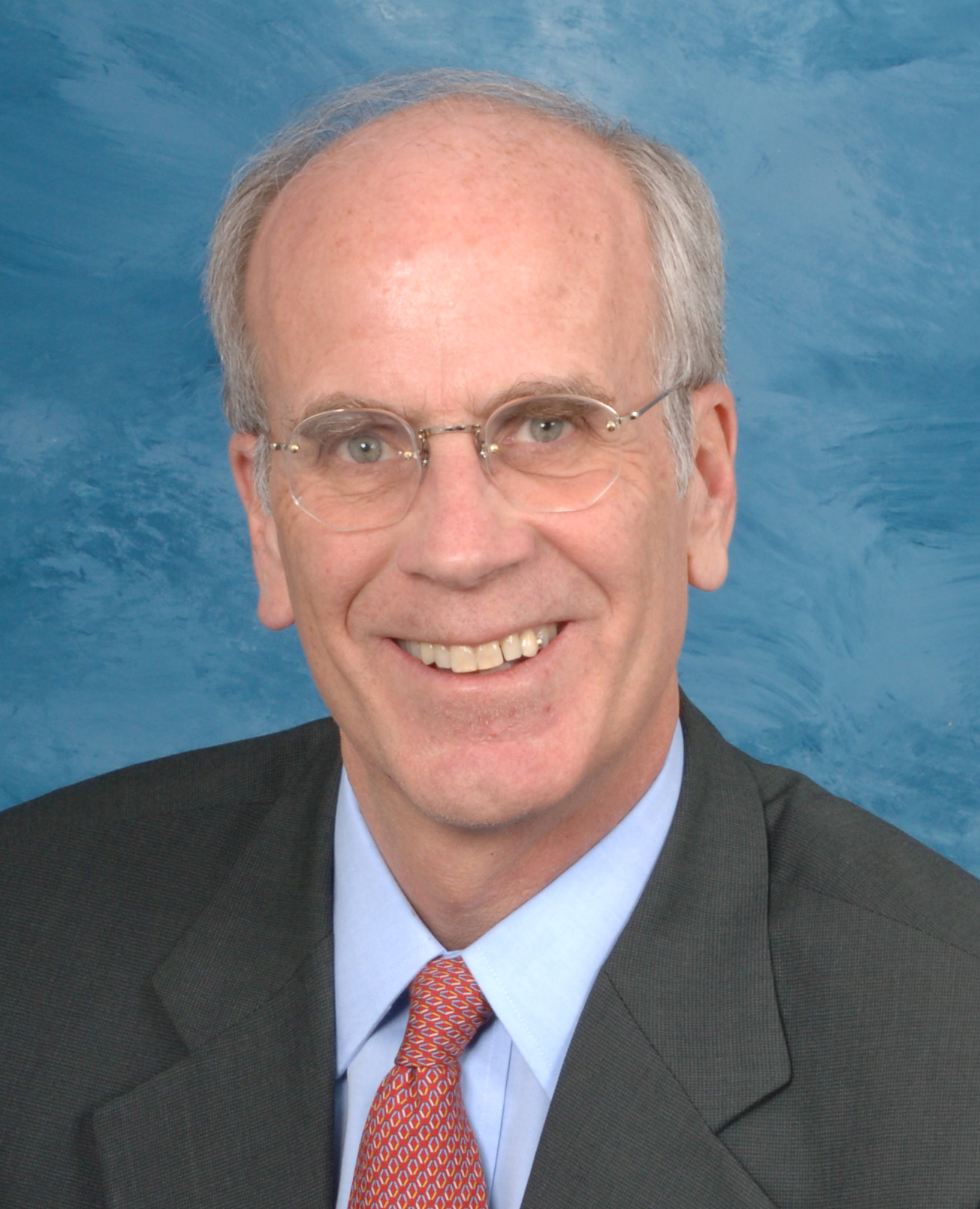

Nominee	Peter Welch	Paul Beaudry
Party	Democratic	Republican
Popular vote	154,006	76,403
Percentage	64.57%	32.03%
- Welch: 40–50% 50–60% 60–70% 70–80% 80–90% Beaudry: 40–50% 50–60% 60–70%
U.S. Representative before election
Peter Welch
Democratic
Elected U.S. Representative
Peter Welch
Democratic

The 2010 United States House of Representatives election in Vermont was held on November 2, 2010, and determined who would represent the state of Vermont in the United States House of Representatives. Democratic Congressman Peter Welch decided to run for a third term in Congress, facing Republican Paul D. Beaudry and two independent candidates. Welch won over his three opponents by a healthy margin, which allowed him to represent Vermont in the 112th Congress.

== Democratic primary ==
=== Candidates ===
- Peter Welch, incumbent U.S. representative

=== Results ===
Democratic primary results
Party	Candidate	Votes	%
Democratic	Peter Welch (incumbent)	65,920	98.63
Democratic	Write-ins	913	1.37
Total votes		66,833	100.00

== Republican primary ==
=== Candidates ===
- Paul D. Beaudry, radio talk show host
- John M. Mitchell, businessman
- Keith Stern, small businessman and 2006 independent Congressional candidate

=== Results ===
Republican primary results
Party	Candidate	Votes	%
Republican	Paul D. Beaudry	10,797	43.83
Republican	John M. Mitchell	9,631	39.10
Republican	Keith Stern	3,545	14.39
Republican	Write-ins	659	2.68
Total votes		24,632	100.00

== General election ==
=== Predictions ===
Source	Ranking	As of
The Cook Political Report	Safe D	November 1, 2010
Rothenberg	Safe D	November 1, 2010
Sabato's Crystal Ball	Safe D	November 1, 2010
RCP	Safe D	November 1, 2010
CQ Politics	Safe D	October 28, 2010
New York Times	Safe D	November 1, 2010
FiveThirtyEight	Safe D	November 1, 2010

=== Results ===
Vermont's at-large congressional district election, 2010
Party	Candidate	Votes	%
Democratic	Peter Welch (incumbent)	154,006	64.57
Republican	Paul D. Beaudry	76,403	32.03
Independent	Gus Jaccaci	4,704	1.97
Socialist	Jane Newton	3,222	1.35
Write-ins		186	0.08
Total votes		238,521	100.00
Democratic hold			

==== By county ====
County	Peter Welch Democratic		Paul Beaudry Republican		Various candidates Other parties		Margin		Total votes cast
County	#	%	#	%	#	%	#	%	Total votes cast
Addison	10,170	67.4%	4,535	30.1%	381	2.5%	5,635	37.3%	15,086
Bennington	8,732	64.2%	4,191	30.8%	683	5.0%	4,541	33.4%	13,606
Caledonia	6,149	55.9%	4,462	40.6%	382	3.4%	1,687	15.3%	10,993
Chittenden	41,372	68.3%	17,715	29.2%	1,514	2.5%	23,657	39.1%	60,601
Essex	1,209	53.2%	947	41.7%	116	5.2%	262	11.5%	2,272
Franklin	9,325	57.9%	6,402	39.8%	371	2.3%	2,923	18.1%	16,098
Grand Isle	2,090	60.4%	1,294	37.4%	79	2.2%	796	23.0%	3,463
Lamoille	6,250	66.0%	2,934	31.0%	281	3.0%	3,316	35.0%	9,465
Orange	6,941	61.1%	3,804	33.5%	620	5.4%	3,137	27.6%	11,365
Orleans	5,464	58.7%	3,560	38.2%	291	3.2%	1,904	20.5%	9,315
Rutland	12,867	57.0%	8,887	39.4%	814	3.6%	3,980	17.6%	22,568
Washington	16,888	68.3%	6,962	28.2%	867	3.4%	9,926	40.1%	24,717
Windham	11,699	69.1%	4,361	25.7%	879	5.2%	7,338	43.4%	16,939
Windsor	14,850	67.4%	6,349	28.8%	834	3.7%	8,501	38.6%	22,033
Totals	154,006	64.6%	76,403	32.0%	8,112	3.4%	77,603	32.6%	238,521
