= 2012 United States House of Representatives election in Vermont =

2012 United States House of Representatives election in Vermont's at-large district
- November 6, 2012
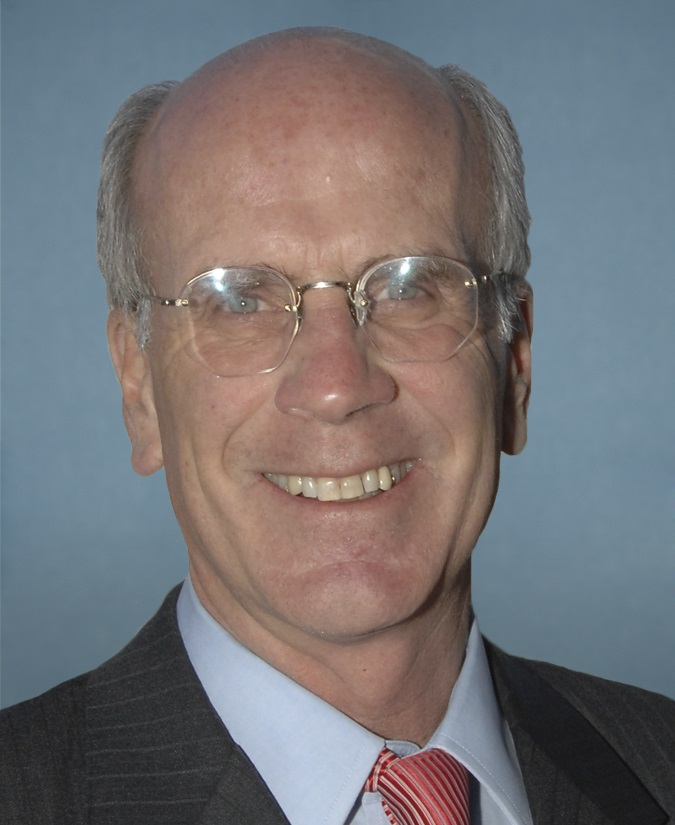

Nominee	Peter Welch	Mark Donka
Party	Democratic	Republican
Popular vote	208,600	67,543
Percentage	72.01%	23.32%
- Welch: 50–60% 60–70% 70–80% 80–90% >90% Donka: 40–50% No votes
U.S. Representative before election
Peter Welch
Democratic
Elected U.S. Representative
Peter Welch
Democratic

The 2012 United States House of Representatives election in Vermont was held on Tuesday, November 6, 2012, to elect the U.S. representative from the state's at-large congressional district. The election coincided with the elections of other federal and state offices, including a quadrennial presidential election and an election to the U.S. Senate. A primary election was held on August 28, 2012.

Incumbent Democrat Peter Welch would be re-elected to a fourth term, defeating Republican Mark Donka by nearly 50 points.

== Democratic nomination ==
=== Candidates ===
==== Nominee ====
- Peter Welch, incumbent U.S. Representative

== Republican nomination ==
=== Candidates ===
==== Nominee ====
- Mark Donka, police officer and former member of the Hartford Board of Selectmen

== Independents ==
- James "Sam" Desrochers (I)
- Andre LaFramboise (VoteKISS)

== General election ==
=== Predictions ===
Source	Ranking	As of
The Cook Political Report	Safe D	November 5, 2012
Rothenberg	Safe D	November 2, 2012
Roll Call	Safe D	November 4, 2012
Sabato's Crystal Ball	Safe D	November 5, 2012
NY Times	Safe D	November 4, 2012
RCP	Safe D	November 4, 2012
The Hill	Safe D	November 4, 2012

=== Results ===
Welch would carry every county in the state, and nearly every municipality, with Donka's sole victory coming in the town of Stratton.

Vermont At-Large Congressional District, 2012
Party	Candidate	Votes	%
Democratic	Peter Welch (incumbent)	208,600	72.01
Republican	Mark Donka	67,543	23.32
Independent	James "Sam" Desrochers	8,302	2.87
Liberty Union	Jane Newton	4,065	1.40
VoteKISS	Andre Laframboise	1,153	0.40
Total votes		289,753	100.0

==== By county ====
County	Peter Welch Democratic		Mark Donka Republican		Various candidates Other parties		Margin		Total votes cast
County	#	%	#	%	#	%	#	%	Total votes cast
Addison	12,975	74.1%	3,870	22.1%	657	3.8%	9,105	52.0%	17,502
Bennington	11,640	69.1%	4,154	24.7%	1,055	6.2%	7,486	44.4%	16,849
Caledonia	8,787	66.0%	3,799	28.5%	729	5.5%	4,988	37.5%	13,315
Chittenden	55,716	75.0%	15,340	20.8%	3,161	4.2%	40,286	54.2%	74,307
Essex	1,684	62.5%	804	29.8%	206	7.7%	880	32.7%	2,694
Franklin	13,531	69.2%	4,893	25.0%	1,116	5.7%	8,638	44.2%	19,540
Grand Isle	2,785	69.6%	998	24.9%	219	5.4%	1,787	44.7%	4,002
Lamoille	8,638	74.3%	2,482	21.3%	510	4.3%	6,156	53.0%	11,630
Orange	9,640	70.3%	3,439	25.1%	638	4.6%	6,201	45.2%	13,717
Orleans	7,803	68.4%	2,997	26.3%	606	5.3%	4,806	42.1%	11,406
Rutland	18,714	67.1%	7,928	28.4%	1,251	4.5%	10,786	38.7%	27,893
Washington	21,574	75.3%	5,854	20.4%	1,205	4.2%	15,720	54.9%	28,633
Windham	15,832	74.9%	4,007	19.0%	1,292	6.1%	11,825	55.9%	21,131
Windsor	19,993	71.3%	6,888	24.6%	1,143	4.0%	13,105	46.7%	28,024
Totals	208,600	71.9%	67,543	23.3%	13,788	4.8%	141,057	48.6%	289,931
