= 2008 United States House of Representatives election in Vermont =

2008 United States House of Representatives election in Vermont's at-large district
- November 4, 2008
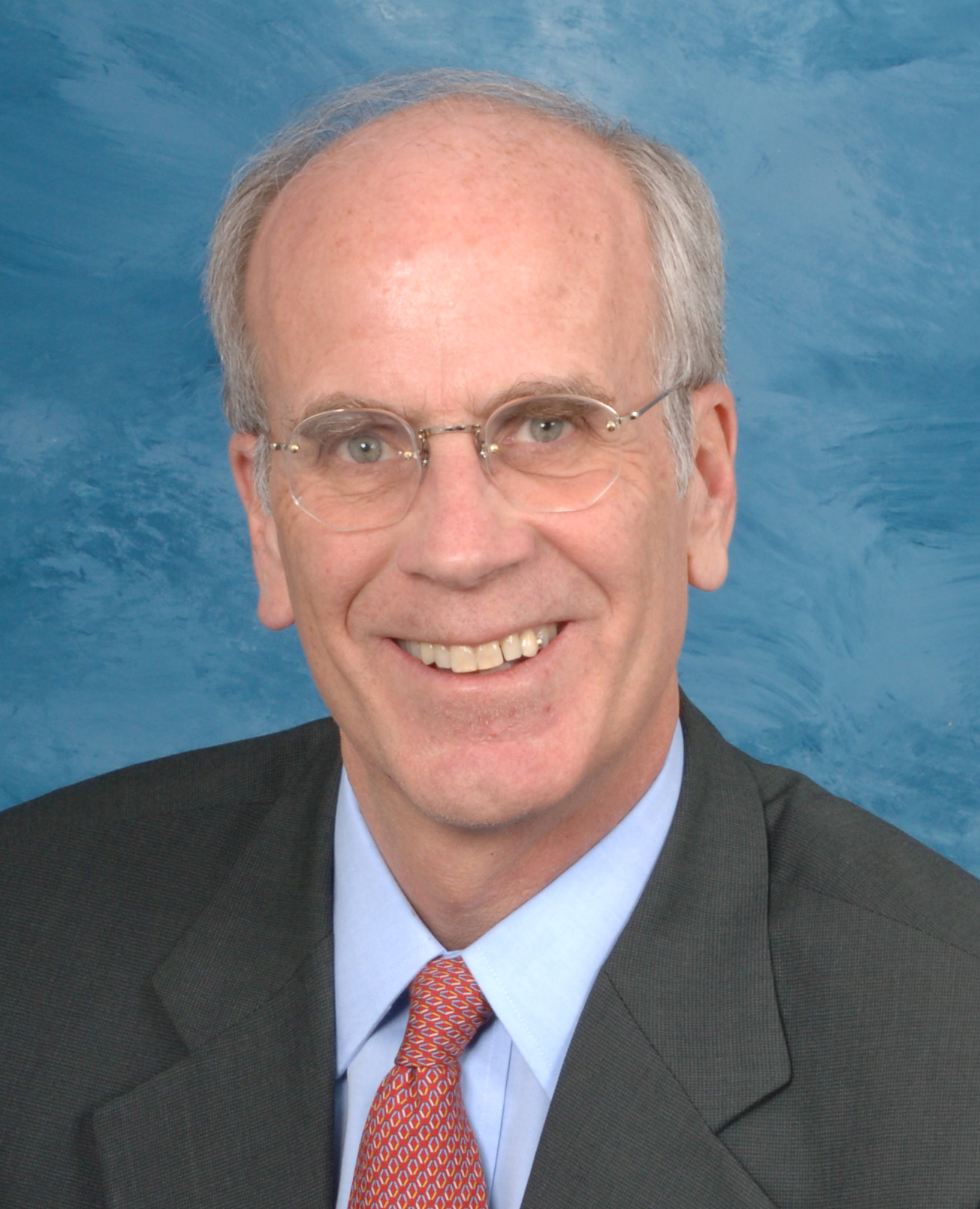

Nominee	Peter Welch	Mike Bethel
Party	Democratic	Independent
Alliance	Republican
Popular vote	248,203	14,349
Percentage	83.25%	4.81%
- Welch: 50–60% 60–70% 70–80% 80–90% >90%
U.S. Representative before election
Peter Welch
Democratic
Elected U.S. Representative
Peter Welch
Democratic

The 2008 United States House of Representatives election in Vermont was held on November 4, 2008, and determined who represents the state of Vermont in the United States House of Representatives. Democratic Congressman Peter Welch decided to run for a second term in Congress. In an aberration for a freshman member of Congress, Welch encountered no major-party opposition and received the Republican nomination based on write-in votes in the primary. Welch defeated a series of independent candidates with ease and represented Vermont in the 111th Congress.

== Democratic primary ==
=== Candidates ===
- Craig Hill, perennial candidate and advocate of Vermont secession
- Peter Welch, incumbent United States songressman

=== Results ===
Democratic primary results
Party	Candidate	Votes	%
Democratic	Peter Welch (incumbent)	19,566	87.74
Democratic	Craig Hill	2,635	11.82
Democratic	Write-ins	98	0.44
Total votes		22,299	100.00

== Independent candidates ==
- Mike Bethel
- Cris Ericson, marijuana activist, perennial candidate
- Jerry Trudell, renewable energy activist, pilot, independent candidate for U.S. House in 2006

== General election ==
=== Predictions ===
Source	Ranking	As of
The Cook Political Report	Safe D	November 6, 2008
Rothenberg	Safe D	November 2, 2008
Sabato's Crystal Ball	Safe D	November 6, 2008
Real Clear Politics	Safe D	November 7, 2008
CQ Politics	Safe D	November 6, 2008

=== Results ===
County flips: Democratic Hold Flip

Vermont's at-large congressional district election, 2008
Party	Candidate	Votes	%
Democratic	Peter Welch (incumbent)	248,203	83.25%
Independent	Mike Bethel	14,349	4.81%
Independent	Jerry Trudell	10,818	3.63%
Progressive	Thomas James Hermann	9,081	3.05%
Independent	Cris Ericson	7,841	2.63%
Liberty Union	Jane Newton	5,307	1.78%
Write-ins		2,552	0.86%
Total votes		298,151	100.00
Democratic hold			

==== By county ====
County	Peter Welch Democratic/Republican		Mike Bethel Independent		Jerry Trudell Independent		Thomas Hermann Progressive		Various candidates Other parties		Margin		Total votes cast
County	#	%	#	%	#	%	#	%	#	%	#	%	Total votes cast
Addison	15,249	85.4%	637	3.6%	583	3.3%	448	2.5%	940	5.3%	14,612	81.8%	17,857
Bennington	11,933	68.8%	3,669	21.1%	681	3.9%	289	1.7%	784	4.5%	8,264	47.7%	17,356
Caledonia	11,259	82.0%	566	4.1%	584	4.3%	420	3.1%	903	6.6%	10,675	77.7% (Note: Compares margin over Trudell.)	13,732
Chittenden	64,252	85.2%	2,712	3.6%	2,584	3.4%	2,527	3.4%	3,307	4.4%	61,540	81.8%	75,382
Essex	2,262	80.4%	155	5.5%	192	6.8%	66	2.3%	137	4.9%	2,070	73.6%	2,812
Franklin	17,239	86.2%	698	3.5%	684	3.4%	414	2.1%	956	4.8%	16,541	82.7%	19,991
Grand Isle	3,418	85.7%	140	3.5%	139	3.5%	78	2.0%	214	5.4%	3,278	82.2%	3,989
Lamoille	9,948	85.5%	381	3.3%	493	4.2%	309	2.7%	500	4.3%	9,455	81.3%	11,631
Orange	11,836	84.2%	516	3.7%	467	3.3%	569	4.0%	662	4.7%	11,267	80.5%	14,050
Orleans	9,957	84.1%	344	2.9%	743	6.3%	281	2.4%	514	4.3%	9,214	77.8%	11,839
Rutland	24,418	83.6%	1,551	5.3%	1,006	3.4%	546	1.9%	1,693	5.8%	22,867	78.3%	29,214
Washington	25,297	84.8%	848	2.8%	977	3.3%	1,601	5.4%	1,124	3.8%	23,696	81.5%	29,847
Windham	16,615	77.2%	1,179	5.5%	810	3.8%	954	4.4%	1,967	9.1%	15,436	71.7%	21,525
Windsor	24,520	84.8%	953	3.3%	875	3.0%	579	2.0%	1,999	6.9%	23,143	81.5%	28,926
Totals	248,203	83.2%	14,349	4.8%	10,818	3.6%	9,081	3.0%	15,700	5.3%	233,854	78.4%	298,151

Counties that flipped from Republican to Democratic

- Rutland (largest municipality: Rutland)
- Grand Isle (largest municipality: Alburgh)
- Caledonia (largest municipality: St. Johnsbury)
- Orleans (largest municipality: Derby)
- Essex (largest city: Lunenburg)
- Franklin (largest city: St. Albans)
