= 2024 Vermont House of Representatives election =

- November 5, 2024

All 150 seats in the Vermont House of Representatives 76 seats needed for a majority
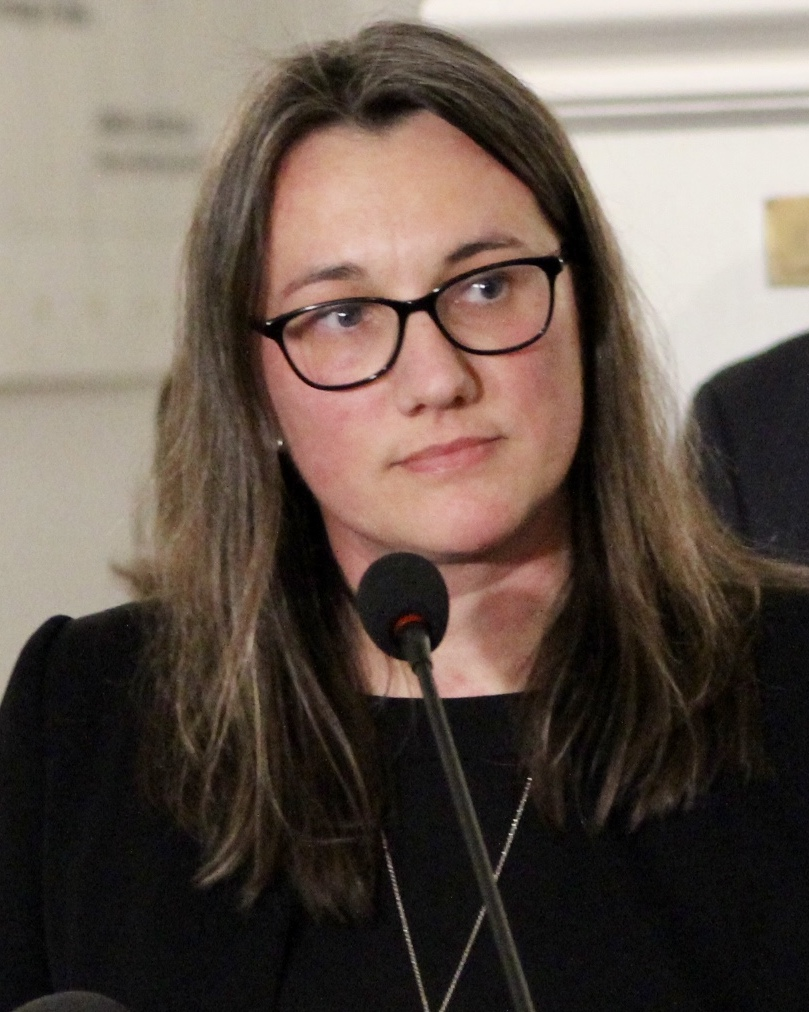

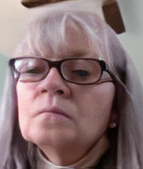

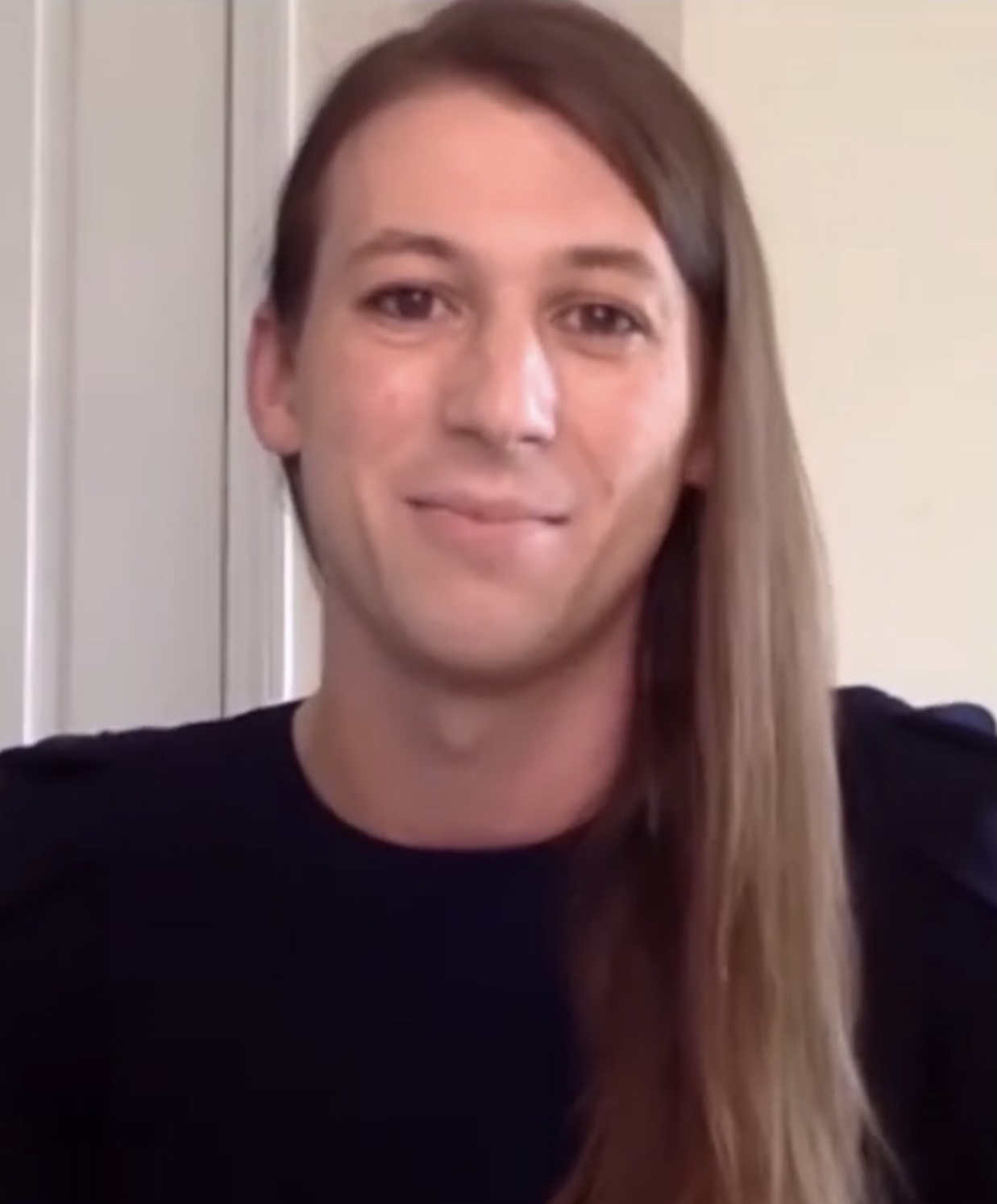
	Majority party	Minority party	Third party
Leader	Jill Krowinski	Patricia McCoy	Taylor Small (retired)
Party	Democratic	Republican	Progressive
Leader since	January 6, 2021	January 9, 2019	April 1, 2024
Leader's seat	Chittenden-16	Rutland-1	Chittenden-21
Last election	104	38	5
Seats before	105	37	4
Seats after	87	56	4
Seat change	▼18	▲19	Steady
Popular vote	250,573	174,572	9,841
Percentage	55.08%	38.37%	2.16%
	Fourth party	Fifth party
Leader	none	Jarrod Sammis (de facto) (retired)
Party	Independent	Libertarian
Leader since	N/A	May 3, 2023
Leader's seat	N/A	Rutland-3
Last election	3	0
Seats before	3	1
Seats after	3	0
Seat change	Steady	▼1
Popular vote	13,263	Did not contest
Percentage	2.92%
- Results: Republican hold Republican gain Democratic hold Democratic gain Independent hold Independent gain Progressive hold
Speaker before election
Jill Krowinski
Democratic
Elected Speaker
Jill Krowinski
Democratic

The 2024 Vermont House of Representatives election was held on November 5, 2024, alongside the 2024 United States elections.

Although the Democrats retained the House, they lost their veto-proof majority, dwindling to 87 seats. Republicans attained their best House result since 2004, coming away with 56 representatives.

== Members not seeking reelection ==
Thirty-five incumbents did not seek re-election.

=== Democrats ===
1. Addison-4: Caleb Elder retired to run for State Senate.
2. Addison-Rutland: Joseph Andriano retired.
3. Bennington-1: Nelson Brownell retired to run for Justice of the Peace in Pownal.
4. Bennington-2: Dane Whitman retired.
5. Bennington-4: Seth Bongartz retired to run for State Senate.
6. Caledonia-2: Chip Troiano retired.
7. Caledonia-Washington: Henry Pearl retired.
8. Chittenden-7: Jessica Brumsted retired to run for Justice of the Peace in Shelburne.
9. Chittenden-8: Noah Hyman retired.
10. Chittenden-13: Gabrielle Stebbins retired.
11. Chittenden-20: Seth Chase retired.
12. Chittenden-20: Curt Taylor retired to run for Justice of the Peace in Colchester.
13. Lamoille-2: Melanie Carpenter retired.
14. Lamoille-Washington: Avram Patt retired.
15. Orleans-3: Dave Templeman retired.
16. Orleans-4: Katherine Sims retired to run for State Senate.
17. Rutland-Windsor: Logan Nicoll retired.
18. Washington-2: Kari Dolan retired.
19. Washington-3: Peter Anthony retired to run for Justice of the Peace in Barre.
20. Windham-1: Sara Coffey retired to run for Justice of the Peace in Guilford.
21. Windham-6: Tristan Roberts retired.
22. Windham-9: Tristan Toleno retired.
23. Windsor-2: John Arrison retired to run for Justice of the Peace in Weathersfield.
24. Windsor-5: Tesha Buss retired.

=== Republicans ===
1. Caledonia-Essex: Scott Beck retired to run for State Senate.
2. Chittenden-19: Patrick Brennan retired to run for State Senate.
3. Chittenden-Franklin: Chris Mattos retired to run for State Senate.
4. Essex-Caledonia: Terri Lynn Williams retired.
5. Orange-3: Rodney Graham retired.
6. Orleans-1: Brian Smith retired to run for Justice of the Peace in Derby.
7. Rutland-2: Arthur Peterson retired.
8. Rutland-4: Paul Clifford retired to run for Justice of the Peace in Rutland.
9. Rutland-8: Butch Shaw retired to run for Justice of the Peace in Pittsford.

=== Progressives ===
1. Chittenden-21: Taylor Small retired to run for Justice of the Peace in Winooski.

=== Libertarians ===
1. Rutland-3: Jarrod Sammis retired.

== Resignation ==
One seat was left vacant on the day of the general election due to resignation in 2024.

=== Independents ===
1. Windham-Windsor-Bennington: Kelly Pajala resigned July 25 to take a job with FEMA.

== Predictions ==
Source	Ranking	As of
Sabato's Crystal Ball	Safe D	October 23, 2024

== Results ==
Italics denote an open seat held by the incumbent party; bold text denotes a gain for a party.

State House District	Incumbent	Party	Elected Representative	Outcome
Addison-1	Amy Sheldon	Dem	Amy Sheldon	Dem Hold
Addison-1	Robin Scheu	Dem	Robin Scheu	Dem Hold
Addison-2	Peter Conlon	Dem	Peter Conlon	Dem Hold
Addison-3	Matt Birong	Dem	Matt Birong	Dem Hold
Addison-3	Diane Lanpher	Dem	**Rob North**	**Rep Gain**
Addison-4	Mari Cordes	Dem	Mari Cordes	Dem Hold
Addison-4	Caleb Elder	Dem	Herb Olson	Dem Hold
Addison-5	Jubilee McGill	Dem	Jubilee McGill	Dem Hold
Addison-Rutland	Joseph Andriano	Dem	**Jim Casey**	**Rep Gain**
Bennington-1	Nelson Brownell	Dem	Jonathan Cooper	Dem Hold
Bennington-2	Timothy R. Corcoran II	Dem	Timothy R. Corcoran II	Dem Hold
Bennington-2	Dane Whitman	Dem	William "Will" Greer	Dem Hold
Bennington-3	David K. Durfee	Dem	David K. Durfee	Dem Hold
Bennington-4	Kathleen James	Dem	Kathleen James	Dem Hold
Bennington-4	Seth Bongartz	Dem	Robert Hunter	Dem Hold
Bennington-5	Mary A. Morrissey	Rep	Mary A. Morrissey	Rep Hold
Bennington-5	Jim Carroll	Dem	Michael Nigro	Dem Hold
Bennington-Rutland	Mike Rice	Dem	**Sandra "Sandy" Pinsonault**	**Rep Gain**
Caledonia-1	Bobby Farlice-Rubio	Dem	**Debra Powers**	**Rep Gain**
Caledonia-2	Chip Troiano	Dem	**Michael "Mike" Southworth**	**Rep Gain**
Caledonia-3	Dennis LaBounty	Dem	**Martha "Marty" Feltus**	**Rep Gain**
Caledonia-3	Beth M. Quimby (Note: Appointed in March 2024)	Rep	Beth M. Quimby	Rep Hold
Caledonia-Essex	R. Scott Campbell	Dem	R. Scott Campbell	Dem Hold
Caledonia-Essex	Scott Beck	Rep	Deborah Cordz Dolgin	Rep Hold
Caledonia-Washington	Henry Pearl	Dem	**Greg Burtt**	**Rep Gain**
Chittenden-1	Jana Brown	Dem	Jana Brown	Dem Hold
Chittenden-2	Erin Brady	Dem	Erin Brady	Dem Hold
Chittenden-2	Angela Arsenault	Dem	Angela Arsenault	Dem Hold
Chittenden-3	Trevor Squirrell	Dem	Trevor Squirrell	Dem Hold
Chittenden-3	Edye Graning	Dem	Edye Graning	Dem Hold
Chittenden-4	Phil Pouech	Dem	Phil Pouech	Dem Hold
Chittenden-5	Chea Waters Evans	Dem	Chea Waters Evans	Dem Hold
Chittenden-6	Kate Lalley	Dem	Kate Lalley	Dem Hold
Chittenden-7	Jessica Brumsted	Dem	Shawn Sweeney	Dem Hold
Chittenden-8	Noah Hyman	Dem	Bridget Burkhardt	Dem Hold
Chittenden-9	Emilie Krasnow	Dem	Emilie Krasnow	Dem Hold
Chittenden-10	Kate Nugent	Dem	Kate Nugent	Dem Hold
Chittenden-11	Brian Minier	Dem	Brian Minier	Dem Hold
Chittenden-12	Martin LaLonde	Dem	Martin LaLonde	Dem Hold
Chittenden-13	Tiff Bluemle	Dem	Tiff Bluemle	Dem Hold
Chittenden-13	Gabrielle Stebbins	Dem	Bram Kleppner	Dem Hold
Chittenden-14	Barbara Rachelson	Dem/Prog	Barbara Rachelson	Dem/Prog Hold
Chittenden-14	Mary-Katherine Stone	Dem	Mary-Katherine Stone	Dem Hold
Chittenden-15	Brian Cina	Prog/Dem	Brian Cina	Prog/Dem Hold
Chittenden-15	Troy Headrick	Prog/Dem	Troy Headrick	Prog/Dem Hold
Chittenden-16	Jill Krowinski	Dem	Jill Krowinski	Dem Hold
Chittenden-16	Kate Logan	Prog/Dem	Kate Logan	Prog/Dem Hold
Chittenden-17	Abbey Duke (Note: Appointed in May 2024)	Dem	Abbey Duke	Dem Hold
Chittenden-18	Carol Ode	Dem	Carol Ode	Dem Hold
Chittenden-18	Robert J. Hooper	Dem	Robert J. Hooper	Dem Hold
Chittenden-19	Sarita Austin	Dem	Sarita Austin	Dem Hold
Chittenden-19	Patrick Brennan	Rep	**Wendy Critchlow**	**Dem Gain**
Chittenden-20	Curt Taylor	Dem	Doug Bishop	Dem Hold
Chittenden-20	Seth Chase	Dem	Gayle Pezzo	Dem Hold
Chittenden-21	Daisy Berbeco	Dem	Daisy Berbeco	Dem Hold
Chittenden-21	Taylor Small	Prog/Dem	Chloe Tomlinson	Prog/Dem Hold
Chittenden-22	Lori Houghton	Dem	Lori Houghton	Dem Hold
Chittenden-22	Karen Dolan	Dem	Karen Dolan	Dem Hold
Chittenden-23	Leonora Dodge	Dem	Leonora Dodge	Dem Hold
Chittenden-23	Golrang "Rey" Garofano	Dem	Golrang "Rey" Garofano	Dem Hold
Chittenden-24	Alyssa Black	Dem	Alyssa Black	Dem Hold
Chittenden-25	Julia Andrews	Dem	**Brenda Steady**	**Rep Gain**
Chittenden-Franklin	Chris Taylor	Rep	Chris Taylor	Rep Hold
Chittenden-Franklin	Chris Mattos	Rep	Anthony "Tony" Micklus	Rep Hold
Essex-Caledonia	Terri Lynn Williams	Rep	John Kascenska	Rep Hold
Essex-Orleans	Larry Labor	Rep	Larry Labor	Rep Hold
Franklin-1	Ashley R. Bartley	Rep/Dem	Ashley R. Bartley	Rep/Dem Hold
Franklin-1	Carolyn Branagan	Rep/Dem	Carolyn Branagan	Rep/Dem Hold
Franklin-2	Eileen "Lynn" Dickinson	Rep/Dem	Eileen "Lynn" Dickinson	Rep/Dem Hold
Franklin-3	Mike McCarthy	Dem	**Joe Luneau**	**Rep Gain**
Franklin-4	Matthew E. Walker	Rep/Dem	Matthew E. Walker	Rep/Dem Hold
Franklin-4	Thomas "Tom" Oliver Jr.	Rep/Dem	Thomas "Tom" Oliver Jr.	Rep/Dem Hold
Franklin-5	Lisa A. Hango	Rep/Dem	Lisa A. Hango	Rep/Dem Hold
Franklin-5	Wayne A. Laroche	Rep/Dem	Wayne A. Laroche	Rep/Dem Hold
Franklin-6	James Gregoire	Rep/Dem	James Gregoire	Rep/Dem Hold
Franklin-7	Allen "Penny" Demar	Rep	Allen "Penny" Demar	Rep Hold
Franklin-8	Casey Toof	Rep	Casey Toof	Rep Hold
Grand Isle-Chittenden	Michael R. Morgan	Rep	Michael R. Morgan	Rep Hold
Grand Isle-Chittenden	Josie Leavitt	Dem	**Leland Morgan**	**Rep Gain**
Lamoille-1	Jed Lipsky	Ind	Jed Lipsky	Ind Hold
Lamoille-2	Daniel Noyes	Dem	Daniel Noyes	Dem Hold
Lamoille-2	Melanie Carpenter (Note: Appointed in March 2023)	Dem	**Richard J. Bailey**	**Rep Gain**
Lamoille-3	Lucy Boyden	Dem	Lucy Boyden	Dem Hold
Lamoille-Washington	Saudia LaMont	Dem	Saudia LaMont	Dem Hold
Lamoille-Washington	Avram Patt	Dem	David Yacovone	Dem Hold
Orange-1	Carl Demrow	Dem	**Michael Tagliavia**	**Rep Gain**
Orange-2	Monique Priestley	Dem	Monique Priestley	Dem Hold
Orange-3	Rodney Graham	Rep	Joshua Dobrovich	Rep Hold
Orange-Caledonia	Joe Parsons	Rep	Joe Parsons	Rep Hold
Orange-Washington-Addison	Jay Hooper	Dem	Jay Hooper	Dem Hold
Orange-Washington-Addison	Larry Satcowitz	Dem	Larry Satcowitz	Dem Hold
Orleans-1	Brian Smith	Rep	Richard M. Nelson	Rep Hold
Orleans-2	Woodman "Woody" H. Page	Rep	Woodman "Woody" H. Page	Rep Hold
Orleans-3	Dave Templeman	Dem	**Ken Wells**	**Rep Gain**
Orleans-4	Katherine Sims	Dem	Leanne Harple	Dem Hold
Orleans-Lamoille	Mark A. Higley	Rep	Mark A. Higley	Rep Hold
Orleans-Lamoille	Michael J. Marcotte	Rep	Michael J. Marcotte	Rep Hold
Rutland-1	Patricia A. McCoy	Rep	Patricia A. McCoy	Rep Hold
Rutland-2	Thomas "Tom" Burditt	Rep	Thomas "Tom" Burditt	Rep Hold
Rutland-2	Arthur Peterson	Rep	David "Dave" Bosch	Rep Hold
Rutland-3	Jarrod Sammis	Lib (Note: Switched political party to Libertarian from Republican in May 2023)	**Chris Brown**	**Rep Gain**
Rutland-4	Paul Clifford	Rep	Christopher Howland	Rep Hold
Rutland-5	Eric Maguire	Rep	Eric Maguire	Rep Hold
Rutland-6	Mary E. Howard	Dem	Mary E. Howard	Dem Hold
Rutland-7	William Notte	Dem	**Chris Keyser**	**Rep Gain**
Rutland-8	Butch Shaw	Rep/Dem	Alicia Malay	Rep/Dem Hold
Rutland-9	Stephanie Zak Jerome	Dem	**Todd Nielsen**	**Rep Gain**
Rutland-10	William "Bill" Canfield	Rep	William "Bill" Canfield	Rep Hold
Rutland-11	Jim Harrison	Rep	Jim Harrison	Rep Hold
Rutland-Bennington	Robin Chesnut-Tangerman	Dem	**Chris Pritchard**	**Rep Gain**
Rutland-Windsor	Logan Nicoll	Dem	**Kevin C. Winter**	**Rep Gain**
Washington-1	Anne B. Donahue	Rep	**Anne B. Donahue** (Note: Re-elected in 2024 as an independent)	**Ind Gain**
Washington-1	Kenneth W. Goslant	Rep	Kenneth W. Goslant	Rep Hold
Washington-2	Dara Torre	Dem	Dara Torre	Dem Hold
Washington-2	Kari Dolan	Dem	Candice White	Dem Hold
Washington-3	Jonathan Williams	Dem	Edward "Teddy" Waszazak	Dem Hold
Washington-3	Peter Anthony	Dem	**Michael Boutin**	**Rep Gain**
Washington-4	Kate McCann	Dem	Kate McCann	Dem/Prog Hold
Washington-4	Conor Casey	Dem	Conor Casey	Dem/Prog Hold
Washington-5	Elanor "Ela" Chapin	Dem	Elanor "Ela" Chapin	Dem Hold
Washington-6	Marc Mihaly	Dem	Marc Mihaly	Dem Hold
Washington-Chittenden	Theresa A. Wood	Dem	Theresa A. Wood	Dem Hold
Washington-Chittenden	Thomas Stevens	Dem	Thomas Stevens	Dem Hold
Washington-Orange	Francis "Topper" McFaun	Rep	Francis "Topper" McFaun	Rep/Dem Hold
Washington-Orange	Gina Galfetti	Rep	Gina Galfetti	Rep Hold
Windham-1	Sara Coffey	Dem	Zon Eastes	Dem Hold
Windham-2	Laura Sibilia	Ind	Laura Sibilia	Ind Hold
Windham-3	Leslie Goldman	Dem	Leslie Goldman	Dem Hold
Windham-3	Michelle Bos-Lun	Dem	Michelle Bos-Lun	Dem Hold
Windham-4	Mike Mrowicki	Dem/Prog	Mike Mrowicki	Dem/Prog Hold
Windham-5	Emily Long	Dem	Emily Long	Dem Hold
Windham-6	Tristan Roberts	Dem	Emily Carris-Duncan	Dem Hold
Windham-7	Emilie Kornheiser	Dem	Emilie Kornheiser	Dem Hold
Windham-8	Mollie S. Burke	Dem	Mollie S. Burke	Dem Hold
Windham-9	Tristan Toleno	Dem	Ian Goodnow	Dem Hold
Windham-Windsor-Bennington	Kelly Pajala	Ind	**Christopher Morrow**	**Dem Gain**
Windsor-1	John Bartholomew	Dem	John Bartholomew	Dem Hold
Windsor-1	Elizabeth Burrows	Dem	Elizabeth Burrows	Dem Hold
Windsor-2	John Arrison	Dem	**VL Coffin**	**Rep Gain**
Windsor-3	Alice M. Emmons	Dem	Alice M. Emmons	Dem Hold
Windsor-3	Kristi C. Morris	Dem	Kristi C. Morris	Dem Hold
Windsor-4	Heather Surprenant	Dem	Heather Surprenant	Dem Hold
Windsor-5	Tesha Buss	Dem	Charlie Kimbell	Dem Hold
Windsor-6	Kevin "Coach" Christie	Dem	Kevin "Coach" Christie	Dem Hold
Windsor-6	Esme Cole	Dem/Prog	Esme Cole	Dem/Prog Hold
Windsor-Addison	Kirk White	Dem	Kirk White	Dem Hold
Windsor-Orange-1	John O'Brien	Dem	John O'Brien	Dem Hold
Windsor-Orange-2	Rebecca Holcombe	Dem	Rebecca Holcombe	Dem Hold
Windsor-Orange-2	Jim Masland	Dem	Jim Masland	Dem Hold
Windsor-Windham	Heather Chase	Dem	**Thomas F. Charlton**	**Rep Gain**

== Detailed results ==
=== Addison-1 ===
- Elects two representatives.

General election

Addison-1 general election, 2024
Party	Candidate	Votes	%
Democratic	Amy Sheldon (incumbent)	2,898	49.6%
Democratic	Robin Scheu (incumbent)	2,776	47.6%
Write-in		163	2.8%
Total votes		5,837	100.0
Democratic hold			
Democratic hold			

=== Addison-2 ===
- Elects one representative.

General election

Addison-2 general election, 2024
Party	Candidate	Votes	%
Democratic	Peter Conlon (incumbent)	1,438	55.9%
Republican	Christine Stone	1,124	43.7%
Write-in		11	0.4%
Total votes		2,573	100.0
Democratic hold			

=== Addison-3 ===
- Elects two representatives.

General election

Addison-3 general election, 2024
Party	Candidate	Votes	%
Republican	Rob North	2,679	27.7%
Democratic	Matt Birong (incumbent)	2,374	24.6%
Democratic	Diane Lanpher (incumbent)	2,357	24.4%
Republican	Joe Baker	2,240	23.2%
Write-in		13	0.1%
Total votes		9,663	100.0
Republican gain from Democratic			
Democratic hold			

=== Addison-4 ===
- Elects two representatives.

General election

Addison-4 general election, 2024
Party	Candidate	Votes	%
Democratic	Herb Olson	3,041	29.7%
Democratic	Mari Cordes (incumbent)	2,830	27.7%
Republican	Chanin Hill	2,374	23.2%
Republican	Renee Mcguinness	1,975	19.3%
Write-in		3	<0.1%
Total votes		10,223	100.0
Democratic hold			
Democratic hold			

=== Addison-5 ===
- Elects one representative.

General election

Addison-5 general election, 2024
Party	Candidate	Votes	%
Democratic	Jubilee McGill (incumbent)	1,403	54.8%
Republican	Del Thompson	1,149	44.9%
Write-in		6	0.2%
Total votes		2,558	100.0
Democratic hold			

=== Addison-Rutland ===
- Elects one representative.

General election

Addison-Rutland general election, 2024
Party	Candidate	Votes	%
Republican	Jim Casey	1,881	94.9%
Write-in		102	5.1%
Total votes		1,983	100.0
Republican gain from Democratic			

=== Bennington-1 ===
- Elects one representative.

General election

Bennington-1 general election, 2024
Party	Candidate	Votes	%
Democratic	Jonathan Cooper	1,265	50.4%
Republican	Bruce Busa	1,242	49.5%
Write-in		3	0.1%
Total votes		2,510	100.0
Democratic hold			

=== Bennington-2 ===
- Elects two representatives.

General election

Bennington-2 general election, 2024
Party	Candidate	Votes	%
Democratic	Timothy Corcoran II (incumbent)	2,136	39.5%
Democratic	Will Greer	1,858	34.4%
Republican	Anthony Cook	1,363	25.2%
Write-in		52	1.0%
Total votes		5,409	100.0
Democratic hold			
Democratic hold			

=== Bennington-3 ===
- Elects one representative.

General election

Bennington-3 general election, 2024
Party	Candidate	Votes	%
Democratic	David Durfee (incumbent)	1,342	56.2%
Republican	Victor Harwood Jr.	1,046	43.8%
Write-in		2	0.1%
Total votes		2,390	100.0
Democratic hold			

=== Bennington-4 ===
- Elects two representatives.

General election

Bennington-4 general election, 2024
Party	Candidate	Votes	%
Democratic	Rob Hunter	3,250	48.2%
Democratic	Kathleen James (incumbent)	3,244	48.2%
Write-in		243	3.6%
Total votes		6,737	100.0
Democratic hold			
Democratic hold			

=== Bennington-5 ===
- Elects two representatives.

General election

Bennington-5 general election, 2024
Party	Candidate	Votes	%
Republican	Mary Morrissey (incumbent)	2,157	36.5%
Democratic	Michael Nigro	1,940	32.8%
Democratic	Jim Carroll (incumbent)	1,763	29.8%
Write-in		54	0.9%
Total votes		5,914	100.0
Republican hold			
Democratic hold			

=== Bennington-Rutland ===
- Elects one representative.

General election

Bennington-Rutland general election, 2024
Party	Candidate	Votes	%
Republican	Sandy Pinsonault	1,475	54.5%
Democratic	Mike Rice (incumbent)	1,225	45.3%
Write-in		5	0.2%
Total votes		2,705	100.0
Republican gain from Democratic			

=== Caledonia-1 ===
- Elects one representative.

General election

Caledonia-1 general election, 2024
Party	Candidate	Votes	%
Republican	Debra Powers	1,468	57.3%
Democratic	Bobby Farlice-Rubio (incumbent)	1,082	42.3%
Write-in		10	0.4%
Total votes		2,560	100.0
Republican gain from Democratic			

=== Caledonia-2 ===
- Elects one representative.

General election

Caledonia-2 general election, 2024
Party	Candidate	Votes	%
Republican	Mike Southworth	1,313	58.5%
Democratic	Sabrina Morrison	931	41.5%
Write-in		1	<0.1%
Total votes		2,245	100.0
Republican gain from Democratic			

=== Caledonia-3 ===
- Elects two representatives.

General election

Caledonia-3 general election, 2024
Party	Candidate	Votes	%
Republican	Marty Feltus	2,335	32.2%
Republican	Beth Quimby	2,222	30.7%
Democratic	Dennis LaBounty (incumbent)	1,487	20.5%
Democratic	Eileen Boland	1,191	16.4%
Write-in		10	0.1%
Total votes		7,245	100.0
Republican hold			
Republican gain from Democratic			

=== Caledonia-Essex ===
- Elects two representatives.

General election

Caledonia-Essex general election, 2024
Party	Candidate	Votes	%
Republican	Deborah Dolgin	2,225	37.1%
Democratic	Scott Campbell (incumbent)	2,159	36.0%
Democratic	Frank Empsall	1,541	25.7%
Write-in		74	1.2%
Total votes		5,999	100.0
Republican hold			
Democratic hold			

=== Caledonia-Washington ===
- Elects one representative.

General election

Caledonia-Washington general election, 2024
Party	Candidate	Votes	%
Republican	Greg Burtt	1,639	56.3%
Democratic	Tomz Ziobrowski	1,271	43.6%
Write-in		2	0.1%
Total votes		2,912	100.0
Republican gain from Democratic			

=== Chittenden-1 ===
- Elects one representative.

General election

Chittenden-1 general election, 2024
Party	Candidate	Votes	%
Democratic	Jana Brown (incumbent)	2,298	97.8%
Write-in		52	2.2%
Total votes		2,350	100.0
Democratic hold			

=== Chittenden-2 ===
- Elects two representatives.

General election

Chittenden-2 general election, 2024
Party	Candidate	Votes	%
Democratic	Erin Brady (incumbent)	4,203	49.9%
Democratic	Angela Arsenault (incumbent)	4,016	47.7%
Write-in		204	2.4%
Total votes		8,423	100.0
Democratic hold			
Democratic hold			

=== Chittenden-3 ===
- Elects two representatives.

General election

Chittenden-3 general election, 2024
Party	Candidate	Votes	%
Democratic	Trevor Squirrell (incumbent)	3,965	49.6%
Democratic	Edye Graning (incumbent)	3,866	48.4%
Write-in		160	2%
Total votes		7,991	100.0
Democratic hold			
Democratic hold			

=== Chittenden-4 ===
- Elects one representative.

General election

Chittenden-4 general election, 2024
Party	Candidate	Votes	%
Democratic	Phil Pouech (incumbent)	2,159	83.9%
Write-in		414	16.1%
Total votes		2,573	100.0
Democratic hold			

=== Chittenden-5 ===
- Elects one representative.

General election

Chittenden-4 general election, 2024
Party	Candidate	Votes	%
Democratic	Chea Evans (incumbent)	1,963	93.6%
Write-in		135	6.4%
Total votes		2,098	100.0
Democratic hold			

=== Chittenden-6 ===
- Elects one representative.

General election

Chittenden-6 general election, 2024
Party	Candidate	Votes	%
Democratic	Kate Lalley (incumbent)	2,042	71.1%
Republican	Deb Mayfield	828	28.9%
Total votes		2,870	100.0
Democratic hold			

=== Chittenden-7 ===
- Elects one representative.

General election

Chittenden-7 general election, 2024
Party	Candidate	Votes	%
Democratic	Shawn Sweeney	2,422	97.9%
Write-in		51	2.1%
Total votes		2,473	100.0
Democratic hold			

=== Chittenden-8 ===
- Elects one representative.

General election

Chittenden-8 general election, 2024
Party	Candidate	Votes	%
Democratic	Bridget Burkhardt	2,182	97.3%
Write-in		60	2.7%
Total votes		2,242	100.0
Democratic hold			

=== Chittenden-9 ===
- Elects one representative.

General election

Chittenden-9 general election, 2024
Party	Candidate	Votes	%
Democratic	Emilie Krasnow (incumbent)	1,924	97.5%
Write-in		50	2.5%
Total votes		1,974	100.0
Democratic hold			

=== Chittenden-10 ===
- Elects one representative.

General election

Chittenden-10 general election, 2024
Party	Candidate	Votes	%
Democratic	Kate Nugent (incumbent)	1,971	96.5%
Write-in		71	3.5%
Total votes		2,042	100.0
Democratic hold			

=== Chittenden-11 ===
- Elects one representative.

General election

Chittenden-11 general election, 2024
Party	Candidate	Votes	%
Democratic	Brian Minier (incumbent)	1,693	98.0%
Write-in		34	2.0%
Total votes		1,727	100.0
Democratic hold			

=== Chittenden-12 ===
- Elects one representative.

General election

Chittenden-12 general election, 2024
Party	Candidate	Votes	%
Democratic	Martin LaLonde (incumbent)	2,402	97.9%
Write-in		51	2.1%
Total votes		2,453	100.0
Democratic hold			

=== Chittenden-13 ===
- Elects two representatives.

General election

Chittenden-13 general election, 2024
Party	Candidate	Votes	%
Democratic	Tiff Bluemle (incumbent)	3,801	53.1%
Democratic	Bram Kleppner	3,296	46.0%
Write-in		66	0.9%
Total votes		7,163	100.0
Democratic hold			
Democratic hold			

=== Chittenden-14 ===
- Elects two representatives.

General election

Chittenden-14 general election, 2024
Party	Candidate	Votes	%
Democratic	Mary-Katherine Stone (incumbent)	1,137	50.4%
Democratic/Progressive	Barbara Rachelson (incumbent) (Note: Candidate received the nominations of both the Democratic and Progressive parties and was listed on the ballot as "Democratic/Progressive" (candidate is primarily a Democrat).)	1,104	49.0%
Write-in		13	0.6%
Total votes		2,254	100.0
Democratic hold			
Democratic hold			

=== Chittenden-15 ===
- Elects two representatives.

General election

Chittenden-15 general election, 2024
Party	Candidate	Votes	%
Progressive/Democratic	Brian Cina (incumbent) (Note: Candidate received the nominations of both the Progressive and Democratic parties and was listed on the ballot as "Progressive/Democratic" (candidate is primarily a Progressive).)	2,124	52.1%
Progressive/Democratic	Troy Headrick (incumbent)	1,898	46.6%
Write-in		53	1.3%
Total votes		4,075	100.0
Progressive hold			
Progressive hold			

=== Chittenden-16 ===
- Elects two representatives.

General election

Chittenden-16 general election, 2024
Party	Candidate	Votes	%
Democratic	Jill Krowinski (incumbent)	2,457	54.6%
Progressive/Democratic	Kate Logan (incumbent)	2,009	44.6%
Write-in		34	0.8%
Total votes		4,500	100.0
Democratic hold			
Progressive hold			

=== Chittenden-17 ===
- Elects one representative.

General election

Chittenden-17 general election, 2024
Party	Candidate	Votes	%
Democratic	Abbey Duke	1,542	61.8%
Progressive	Missa Aloisi	935	37.4%
Write-in		20	0.8%
Total votes		2,497	100.0
Democratic hold			

=== Chittenden-18 ===
- Elects two representatives.

General election

Chittenden-18 general election, 2024
Party	Candidate	Votes	%
Democratic	Carol Ode (incumbent)	3,264	50.4%
Democratic	Robert Hooper (incumbent)	3,091	47.7%
Write-in		123	1.9%
Total votes		6,478	100.0
Democratic hold			
Democratic hold			

=== Chittenden-19 ===
- Elects two representatives.

General election

Chittenden-19 general election, 2024
Party	Candidate	Votes	%
Democratic	Wendy Critchlow	2,682	31.5%
Democratic	Sarita Austin (incumbent)	2,458	28.9%
Republican	Leland Gazo	2,408	28.3%
Republican/Libertarian	Spencer Sherman (Note: Candidate received the nominations of both the Republican and Libertarian parties and was listed on the ballot as "Republican/Libertarian" (candidate is primarily a Republican).)	934	11.0%
Write-in		23	0.3%
Total votes		8,505	100.0
Democratic gain from Republican			
Democratic hold			

=== Chittenden-20 ===
- Elects two representatives.

General election

Chittenden-20 general election, 2024
Party	Candidate	Votes	%
Democratic	Doug Bishop	2,233	32.5%
Democratic	Gayle Pezzo	1,742	25.4%
Republican	Doug Wood	1,690	24.6%
Republican	Joshua Cropp	1,184	17.2%
Write-in		22	0.3%
Total votes		6,871	100.0
Democratic hold			
Democratic hold			

=== Chittenden-21 ===
- Elects two representatives.

General election

Chittenden-21 general election, 2024
Party	Candidate	Votes	%
Democratic	Daisy Berbeco (incumbent)	2,554	53.1%
Progressive/Democratic	Chloe Tomlinson	2,183	45.3%
Write-in		79	1.6%
Total votes		4,816	100.0
Democratic hold			
Progressive hold			

=== Chittenden-22 ===
- Elects two representatives.

General election

Chittenden-22 general election, 2024
Party	Candidate	Votes	%
Democratic	Lori Houghton (incumbent)	3,631	49.6%
Democratic	Karen Dolan (incumbent)	3,500	47.8%
Write-in		186	2.5%
Total votes		7,317	100.0
Democratic hold			
Democratic hold			

=== Chittenden-23 ===
- Elects two representatives.

General election

Chittenden-23 general election, 2024
Party	Candidate	Votes	%
Democratic	Leonora Dodge (incumbent)	2,816	38.5%
Democratic	Rey Garofano (incumbent)	2,395	32.8%
Republican	Lynn Smith	2,093	28.6%
Write-in		8	0.1%
Total votes		7,312	100.0
Democratic hold			
Democratic hold			

=== Chittenden-24 ===
- Elects one representative.

General election

Chittenden-24 general election, 2024
Party	Candidate	Votes	%
Democratic	Alyssa Black (incumbent)	1,531	57.7%
Republican	Ron Lawrence	1,122	42.3%
Write-in		1	<0.1%
Total votes		2,654	100.0
Democratic hold			

=== Chittenden-25 ===
- Elects one representative.

General election

Chittenden-25 general election, 2024
Party	Candidate	Votes	%
Republican	Brenda Steady	1,437	52.4%
Democratic	Julia Andrews (incumbent)	1,296	47.3%
Write-in		8	0.3%
Total votes		2,741	100.0
Republican gain from Democratic			

=== Chittenden-Franklin ===
- Elects two representatives.

General election

Chittenden-Franklin general election, 2024
Party	Candidate	Votes	%
Republican	Chris Taylor (incumbent)	2,655	35.2%
Republican	Tony Micklus	1,973	26.1%
Democratic	Lonnie Poland	1,775	23.5%
Democratic	Henry Bonges III	1,126	14.9%
Write-in		19	0.3%
Total votes		7,548	100.0
Republican hold			
Republican hold			

=== Essex-Caledonia ===
- Elects one representative.

General election

Essex-Caledonia general election, 2024
Party	Candidate	Votes	%
Republican	John Kascenska II	1,936	97.5%
Write-in		50	2.5%
Total votes		1,986	100.0
Republican hold			

=== Essex-Orleans ===
- Elects one representative.

General election

Essex-Orleans general election, 2024
Party	Candidate	Votes	%
Republican	Larry Labor (incumbent)	2,164	96.7%
Write-in		75	3.3%
Total votes		2,239	100.0
Republican hold			

=== Franklin-1 ===
- Elects two representatives.

General election

Franklin-1 general election, 2024
Party	Candidate	Votes	%
Republican/Democratic	Carolyn Branagan (incumbent) (Note: Candidate received the nominations of both the Republican and Democratic parties and was listed on the ballot as "Republican/Democratic" (candidate is primarily a Republican).)	3,997	49.7%
Republican/Democratic	Ashley Bartley (incumbent)	3,954	49.2%
Write-in		92	1.1%
Total votes		8,043	100.0
Republican hold			
Republican hold			

=== Franklin-2 ===
- Elects one representative.

General election

Franklin-2 general election, 2024
Party	Candidate	Votes	%
Republican/Democratic	Lynn Dickinson (incumbent)	2,028	96.1%
Write-in		83	3.9%
Total votes		2,111	100.0
Republican hold			

=== Franklin-3 ===
- Elects one representative.

General election

Franklin-3 general election, 2024
Party	Candidate	Votes	%
Republican	Joe Luneau	1,125	53.9%
Democratic	Mike McCarthy (incumbent)	955	45.7%
Write-in		8	0.4%
Total votes		2,088	100.0
Republican hold			

=== Franklin-4 ===
- Elects two representatives.

General election

Franklin-4 general election, 2024
Party	Candidate	Votes	%
Republican/Democratic	Matthew Walker (incumbent)	3,206	50.8%
Republican/Democratic	Tom Oliver Jr. (incumbent)	3,049	48.3%
Write-in		59	0.9%
Total votes		6,314	100.0
Republican hold			
Republican hold			

=== Franklin-5 ===
- Elects two representatives.

General election

Franklin-5 general election, 2024
Party	Candidate	Votes	%
Republican/Democratic	Wayne Laroche (incumbent)	3,190	50.3%
Republican/Democratic	Lisa Hango (incumbent)	3,082	48.6%
Write-in		64	1.0%
Total votes		6,336	100.0
Republican hold			
Republican hold			

=== Franklin-6 ===
- Elects one representative.

General election

Franklin-6 general election, 2024
Party	Candidate	Votes	%
Republican/Democratic	James Gregoire (incumbent)	2,334	96.6%
Write-in		82	3.4%
Total votes		2,416	100.0
Republican hold			

=== Franklin-7 ===
- Elects one representative.

General election

Franklin-7 general election, 2024
Party	Candidate	Votes	%
Republican	Penny Demar (incumbent)	1,389	66.6%
Progressive/Democratic	Heather Moore	692	33.2%
Write-in		5	0.2%
Total votes		2,086	100.0
Republican hold			

=== Franklin-8 ===
- Elects one representative.

General election

Franklin-8 general election, 2024
Party	Candidate	Votes	%
Republican	Casey Toof (incumbent)	1,416	62.9%
Democratic	Zach Scheffler	825	36.6%
Write-in		11	0.5%
Total votes		2,252	100.0
Republican hold			

=== Grand Isle-Chittenden ===
- Elects two representatives.

General election

Grand Isle-Chittenden general election, 2024
Party	Candidate	Votes	%
Republican	Michael Morgan (incumbent)	3,211	30.6%
Republican	Leland Morgan	3,175	30.2%
Democratic	Josie Leavitt (incumbent)	2,368	22.6%
Democratic	Luke Richter	1,719	16.4%
Write-in		23	0.2%
Total votes		10,496	100.0
Republican hold			
Republican gain from Democratic			

=== Lamoille-1 ===
- Elects one representative.

General election

Lamoille-1 general election, 2024
Party	Candidate	Votes	%
Independent	Jed Lipsky (incumbent)	2,345	98.6%
Write-in		34	1.4%
Total votes		2,379	100.0
Independent hold			

=== Lamoille-2 ===
- Elects two representatives.

General election

Lamoille-2 general election, 2024
Party	Candidate	Votes	%
Democratic	Daniel Noyes (incumbent)	2,141	28.4%
Republican	Richard Bailey	2,055	27.3%
Republican	Mac Teale	1,671	22.2%
Democratic	Jim Ryan	1,658	22.0%
Write-in		13	0.2%
Total votes		7,538	100.0
Democratic hold			
Republican gain from Democratic			

=== Lamoille-3 ===
- Elects two representatives.

General election

Lamoille-3 general election, 2024
Party	Candidate	Votes	%
Democratic	Lucy Boyden (incumbent)	1,412	54.2%
Republican	Paul Sciortino	1,188	45.6%
Write-in		5	0.2%
Total votes		2,605	100.0
Democratic hold			

=== Lamoille-Washington ===
- Elects two representatives.

General election

Lamoille-Washington general election, 2024
Party	Candidate	Votes	%
Democratic	David Yacovone	3,098	34.2%
Democratic	Saudia LaMont (incumbent)	2,412	26.6%
Republican	Charles Burnham	1,873	20.7%
Republican	Nick Lopez	1,670	18.4%
Write-in		15	0.2%
Total votes		9,068	100.0
Democratic hold			
Democratic hold			

=== Orange-1 ===
- Elects one representative.

General election

Orange-1 general election, 2024
Party	Candidate	Votes	%
Republican	Michael Tagliavia	1,363	53.4%
Democratic	Carl Demrow (incumbent)	1,188	46.5%
Write-in		2	0.1%
Total votes		2,553	100.0
Republican gain from Democratic			

=== Orange-2 ===
- Elects one representative.

General election

Orange-2 general election, 2024
Party	Candidate	Votes	%
Democratic	Monique Priestly (incumbent)	1,314	53.4%
Republican	Zachary Lang	1,138	46.3%
Write-in		8	0.3%
Total votes		2,460	100.0
Democratic hold			

=== Orange-3 ===
- Elects one representative.

General election

Orange-3 general election, 2024
Party	Candidate	Votes	%
Republican	Joshua Dobrovich	1,839	96.6%
Write-in		65	3.4%
Total votes		1,904	100.0
Republican hold			

=== Orange-Caledonia ===
- Elects one representative.

General election

Orange-Caledonia general election, 2024
Party	Candidate	Votes	%
Republican	Joe Parsons (incumbent)	1,530	62.7%
Democratic	James Merriam	909	37.2%
Write-in		3	0.1%
Total votes		2,442	100.0
Republican hold			

=== Orange-Washington-Addison ===
- Elects two representatives.

General election

Orange-Washington-Addison general election, 2024
Party	Candidate	Votes	%
Democratic	Jay Hooper (incumbent)	2,885	34.1%
Democratic	Larry Satcowitz (incumbent)	2,089	24.7%
Republican	Wayne Townsend	1,955	23.1%
Republican	Rob Sikora	1,516	17.9%
Write-in		21	0.2%
Total votes		8,466	100.0
Democratic hold			
Democratic hold			

=== Orleans-1 ===
- Elects one representative.

General election

Orleans-1 general election, 2024
Party	Candidate	Votes	%
Republican	Richard Nelson	2,257	98.3%
Write-in		40	1.7%
Total votes		2,297	100.0
Republican hold			

=== Orleans-2 ===
- Elects one representative.

General election

Orleans-2 general election, 2024
Party	Candidate	Votes	%
Republican	Woody Page (incumbent)	1,478	97.3%
Write-in		41	2.7%
Total votes		1,519	100.0
Republican hold			

=== Orleans-3 ===
- Elects one representative.

General election

Orleans-3 general election, 2024
Party	Candidate	Votes	%
Republican	Ken Wells	1,565	95.1%
Write-in		81	4.9%
Total votes		1,646	100.0
Republican gain from Democratic			

=== Orleans-4 ===
- Elects one representative.

General election

Orleans-4 general election, 2024
Party	Candidate	Votes	%
Democratic	Leanne Harple	1,284	52.1%
Republican	Tony Daniels	1,164	47.2%
Write-in		18	0.7%
Total votes		2,466	100.0
Democratic hold			

=== Orleans-Lamoille ===
- Elects two representatives.

General election

Orleans-Lamoille general election, 2024
Party	Candidate	Votes	%
Republican	Mark Higley (incumbent)	3,169	51.3%
Republican	Michael Marcotte (incumbent)	2,929	47.4%
Write-in		77	1.2%
Total votes		6,175	100.0
Republican hold			
Republican hold			

=== Rutland-1 ===
- Elects one representative.

General election

Rutland-1 general election, 2024
Party	Candidate	Votes	%
Republican	Patricia McCoy (incumbent)	1,955	97.5%
Write-in		51	2.5%
Total votes		2,006	100.0
Republican hold			

=== Rutland-2 ===
- Elects two representatives.

General election

Rutland-2 general election, 2024
Party	Candidate	Votes	%
Republican	Tom Burditt (incumbent)	3,014	37.0%
Republican	Dave Bosch	2,836	34.9%
Democratic	Dave Potter	2,234	27.5%
Write-in		52	0.6%
Total votes		8,136	100.0
Republican hold			
Republican hold			

=== Rutland-3 ===
- Elects one representative.

General election

Rutland-3 general election, 2024
Party	Candidate	Votes	%
Republican	Chris Brown	1,727	97.0%
Write-in		54	3.0%
Total votes		1,781	100.0
Republican gain from Libertarian			

=== Rutland-4 ===
- Elects one representative.

General election

Rutland-4 general election, 2024
Party	Candidate	Votes	%
Republican	Christopher Howland	1,458	55.8%
Democratic	Anna Tadio	1,148	44.0%
Write-in		5	0.2%
Total votes		2,611	100.0
Republican hold			

=== Rutland-5 ===
- Elects one representative.

General election

Rutland-5 general election, 2024
Party	Candidate	Votes	%
Republican	Eric Maguire (incumbent)	1,754	96.6%
Write-in		62	3.4
Total votes		1,816	100.0
Republican hold			

=== Rutland-6 ===
- Elects one representative.

General election

Rutland-6 general election, 2024
Party	Candidate	Votes	%
Democratic	Mary Howard (incumbent)	849	51.1%
Republican	Cindy Laskevich	802	48.3%
Write-in		11	0.7%
Total votes		1,662	100.0
Democratic hold			

=== Rutland-7 ===
- Elects one representative.

General election

Rutland-7 general election, 2024
Party	Candidate	Votes	%
Republican	Chris Keyser	1,157	57.9%
Democratic	William Notte (incumbent)	837	41.9%
Write-in		3	0.2%
Total votes		1,997	100.0
Republican gain from Democratic			

=== Rutland-8 ===
- Elects one representative.

General election

Rutland-8 general election, 2024
Party	Candidate	Votes	%
Republican/Democratic	Alicia Malay	2,263	97.8%
Write-in		52	2.2%
Total votes		2,315	100.0
Republican hold			

=== Rutland-9 ===
- Elects one representative.

General election

Rutland-9 general election, 2024
Party	Candidate	Votes	%
Republican	Todd Nielsen	1,260	54.4%
Democratic	Stephanie Jerome (incumbent)	1,056	45.6%
Total votes		2,316	100.0
Republican gain from Democratic			

=== Rutland-10 ===
- Elects one representative.

General election

Rutland-10 general election, 2024
Party	Candidate	Votes	%
Republican	Bill Canfield (incumbent)	1,814	98.6%
Write-in		25	1.4%
Total votes		1,839	100.0
Republican hold			

=== Rutland-11 ===
- Elects one representative.

General election

Rutland-11 general election, 2024
Party	Candidate	Votes	%
Republican	Jim Harrison (incumbent)	2,175	98.2%
Write-in		39	1.8%
Total votes		2,214	100.0
Republican hold			

=== Rutland-Bennington ===
- Elects one representative.

General election

Rutland-Bennington general election, 2024
Party	Candidate	Votes	%
Republican	Chris Pritchard	1,450	55.8%
Democratic	Robin Chesnut-Tangerman (incumbent)	1,135	43.7%
Write-in		15	0.6%
Total votes		2,600	100.0
Republican gain from Democratic			

=== Rutland-Windsor ===
- Elects one representative

General election

Rutland-Windsor general election, 2024
Party	Candidate	Votes	%
Republican	Kevin Winter	1,572	57.5%
Democratic	Adrienne Raymond	1,153	42.2%
Write-in		8	0.3%
Total votes		2,733	100.0
Republican gain from Democratic			

=== Washington-1 ===
- Elects two representatives.

General election

Washington-1 general election, 2024
Party	Candidate	Votes	%
Independent	Anne Donahue (incumbent)	2,421	34.1%
Republican	Kenneth Goslant (incumbent)	2,344	33.0%
Democratic	Lucas Herring	1,173	16.5%
Democratic	Dave Rapacz	1,137	16.0%
Write-in		31	0.4%
Total votes		7,106	100.0
Independent gain from Republican			
Republican hold			

=== Washington-2 ===
- Elects two representatives.

General election

Washington-2 general election, 2024
Party	Candidate	Votes	%
Democratic	Candice White	3,164	34.8%
Democratic	Dara Torre (incumbent)	2,644	29.1%
Independent	John Burns	2,201	24.2%
Common Sense	Eugene Bifano	1,039	11.4%
Write-in		41	0.5%
Total votes		9,089	100.0
Democratic hold			
Democratic hold			

=== Washington-3 ===
- Elects two representatives.

General election

Washington-3 general election, 2024
Party	Candidate	Votes	%
Republican	Michael Boutin	1,857	30.7%
Democratic	Teddy Waszazak	1,422	23.5%
Democratic	Jonathan Williams (incumbent)	1,384	22.9%
Independent	Carol Dawes	1,363	22.5%
Write-in		19	0.3%
Total votes		6,045	100.0
Republican gain from Democratic			
Democratic hold			

=== Washington-4 ===
- Elects two representatives.

General election

Washington-4 general election, 2024
Party	Candidate	Votes	%
Democratic/Progressive	Kate McCann (incumbent)	3,834	49.5%
Democratic/Progressive	Conor Casey (incumbent)	3,789	48.9%
Write-in		128	1.7%
Total votes		7,751	100.0
Democratic hold			
Democratic hold			

=== Washington-5 ===
- Elects one representative.

General election

Washington-5 general election, 2024
Party	Candidate	Votes	%
Democratic	Ela Chapin (incumbent)	2,268	96.6%
Write-in		79	3.4%
Total votes		2,347	100.0
Democratic hold			

=== Washington-6 ===
- Elects one representative.

General election

Washington-6 general election, 2024
Party	Candidate	Votes	%
Democratic	Marc Mihaly (incumbent)	2,101	93.9%
Write-in		136	6.1%
Total votes		2,237	100.0
Democratic hold			

=== Washington-Chittenden ===
- Elects two representatives.

General election

Washington-Chittenden general election, 2024
Party	Candidate	Votes	%
Democratic	Theresa Wood (incumbent)	3,369	34.8%
Democratic	Thomas Stevens (incumbent)	2,825	29.1%
Republican	Jonathan Griffin	2,093	21.6%
Independent	James Haddad	1,349	13.9%
Write-in		57	0.6%
Total votes		9,693	100.0
Democratic hold			
Democratic hold			

=== Washington-Orange ===
- Elects two representatives.

General election

Washington-Orange general election, 2024
Party	Candidate	Votes	%
Republican	Gina Galfetti (incumbent)	3,271	40.9%
Republican/Democratic	Topper McFaun (incumbent)	2,911	36.4%
Democratic	Melissa Battah	1,781	22.3%
Write-in		35	0.4%
Total votes		7,998	100.0
Republican hold			
Republican hold			

=== Windham-1 ===
- Elects one representative.

General election

Windham-1 general election, 2024
Party	Candidate	Votes	%
Democratic	Zon Eastes	1,468	57.0%
Republican	Nancy Gassett	1,092	42.4%
Write-in		14	0.5%
Total votes		2,574	100.0
Democratic hold			

=== Windham-2 ===
- Elects one representative.

General election

Windham-2 general election, 2024
Party	Candidate	Votes	%
Independent	Laura Sibilia (incumbent)	1,580	93.2%
Write-in		115	6.8%
Total votes		1,695	100.0
Independent hold			

=== Windham-3 ===
- Elects two representatives.

General election

Windham-3 general election, 2024
Party	Candidate	Votes	%
Democratic	Leslie Goldman (incumbent)	2,312	29.9%
Democratic	Michelle Bos-Lun (incumbent)	2,271	29.4%
Independent	Casey Cota	2,004	25.9%
Republican	Ryan Coyne	1,128	14.6%
Write-in		12	0.2%
Total votes		7,727	100.0
Democratic hold			
Democratic hold			

=== Windham-4 ===
- Elects one representative.

General election

Windham-4 general election, 2024
Party	Candidate	Votes	%
Democratic/Progressive	Mike Mrowicki (incumbent)	1,958	73.0%
Republican	Lynne Wilkins	719	26.8%
Write-in		7	0.3%
Total votes		2,684	100.0
Democratic hold			

=== Windham-5 ===
- Elects one representative.

General election

Windham-5 general election, 2024
Party	Candidate	Votes	%
Democratic	Emily Long (incumbent)	1,944	95.2%
Write-in		99	4.8%
Total votes		2,043	100.0
Democratic hold			

=== Windham-6 ===
- Elects one representative.

General election

Windham-6 general election, 2024
Party	Candidate	Votes	%
Democratic	Emily Carris-Duncan	1,316	55.3%
Republican	Pam Baker	1,062	44.6%
Write-in		2	0.1%
Total votes		2,380	100.0
Democratic hold			

=== Windham-7 ===
- Elects one representative.

General election

Windham-7 general election, 2024
Party	Candidate	Votes	%
Democratic	Emilie Kornheiser (incumbent)	1,363	66.9%
Republican	Susan Murray	646	31.7%
Write-in		28	1.4%
Total votes		2,037	100.0
Democratic hold			

=== Windham-8 ===
- Elects one representative.

General election

Windham-8 general election, 2024
Party	Candidate	Votes	%
Democratic	Mollie Burke (incumbent)	1,566	79.9%
Republican	Bill Harvey	323	16.5%
Independent	Ken Fay	69	3.5%
Write-in		3	0.2%
Total votes		1,961	100.0
Democratic hold			

=== Windham-9 ===
- Elects one representative.

General election

Windham-9 general election, 2024
Party	Candidate	Votes	%
Democratic	Ian Goodnow	1,882	97.5%
Write-in		48	2.5%
Total votes		1,930	100.0
Democratic hold			

=== Windham-Windsor-Bennington ===
- Elects one representative.

General election

Windham-Windsor-Bennington general election, 2024
Party	Candidate	Votes	%
Democratic	Chris Morrow	1,585	62.8%
Republican	Jan Payne	936	37.1%
Write-in		3	0.1%
Total votes		2,524	100.0
Democratic gain from Independent			

=== Windsor-1 ===
- Elects two representatives.

General election

Windsor-1 general election, 2024
Party	Candidate	Votes	%
Democratic	John Bartholomew (incumbent)	3,174	49.0%
Democratic	Elizabeth Burrows (incumbent)	2,993	46.2%
Write-in		317	4.9%
Total votes		6,484	100.0
Democratic hold			
Democratic hold			

=== Windsor-2 ===
- Elects one representative.

General election

Windsor-2 general election, 2024
Party	Candidate	Votes	%
Republican	VL Coffin	1,417	52.6%
Democratic	Mark Yuengling	1,273	47.3%
Write-in		3	0.1%
Total votes		2,693	100.0
Republican gain from Democratic			

=== Windsor-3 ===
- Elects one representative.

General election

Windsor-3 general election, 2024
Party	Candidate	Votes	%
Democratic	Kristi Morris (incumbent)	2,062	25.6%
Democratic	Alice Emmons (incumbent)	2,047	25.4%
Republican	Keith Stern	2,025	25.2%
Republican	Judith Stern	1,891	23.5%
Write-in		25	0.3%
Total votes		8,050	100.0
Democratic hold			
Democratic hold			

=== Windsor-4 ===
- Elects one representative.

General election

Windsor-4 general election, 2024
Party	Candidate	Votes	%
Democratic	Heather Surprenant (incumbent)	2,050	95.6%
Write-in		94	4.4%
Total votes		2,144	100.0
Democratic hold			

=== Windsor-5 ===
- Elects one representative.

General election

Windsor-5 general election, 2024
Party	Candidate	Votes	%
Democratic	Charlie Kimbell	2,102	74.5%
Republican	Steve Radonis	701	24.8%
Write-in		19	0.7%
Total votes		2,822	100.0
Democratic hold			

=== Windsor-6 ===
- Elects two representatives.

General election

Windsor-6 general election, 2024
Party	Candidate	Votes	%
Democratic/Progressive	Esme Cole (incumbent)	2,997	38.7%
Democratic	Coach Christie (incumbent)	2,649	34.2%
Republican	Joe Trottier	2,025	26.1%
Write-in		82	1.1%
Total votes		7,753	100.0
Democratic hold			
Democratic hold			

=== Windsor-Addison ===
- Elects one representative.

General election

Windsor-Addison Democratic primary, 2024
Party	Candidate	Votes	%
Democratic	Kirk White (incumbent)	1,721	92.3%
Write-in		144	7.7%
Total votes		1,865	100.0
Democratic hold			

=== Windsor-Orange-1 ===
- Elects one representative.

General election

Windsor-Orange-1 general election, 2024
Party	Candidate	Votes	%
Democratic	John O'Brien (incumbent)	1,202	50.8%
Republican	Bruce Post	1,146	48.5%
Write-in		16	0.7%
Total votes		2,364	100.0
Democratic hold			

=== Windsor-Orange-2 ===
- Elects two representatives.

General election

Windsor-Orange-2 general election, 2024
Party	Candidate	Votes	%
Democratic	Rebecca Holcombe (incumbent)	4,348	39.4%
Democratic	Jim Masland (incumbent)	4,089	37.1%
Republican	Kevin Blakeman	1,342	12.2%
Republican	Lisa Flanders	1,214	11.0%
Write-in		34	0.3%
Total votes		11,027	100.0
Democratic hold			
Democratic hold			

=== Windsor-Windham ===
- Elects one representative.

General election

Windsor-Windham general election, 2024
Party	Candidate	Votes	%
Republican	Thomas Charlton	1,345	50.7%
Democratic	Heather Chase (incumbent)	1,302	49.1%
Write-in		5	0.2%
Total votes		2,652	100.0
Republican gain from Democratic			
