= Logan Nicoll =

American politician

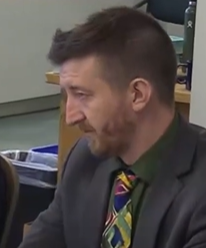
- Nicoll in 2024

Member of the Vermont House of Representatives from the Rutland-Windsor district
- In office January 9, 2019 – January 8, 2025
- Preceded by: Dennis Devereux
- Succeeded by: Kevin C. Winter

Personal details
- Born: Ludlow, Vermont, U.S.
- Party: Democratic
- Children: 2
- Education: University of Vermont (BS)

Logan Nicoll is an American politician who was a member of the Vermont House of Representatives for the Rutland-Windsor-2 District. Elected in November 2018, he assumed office on January 9, 2019 and left office on January 8, 2025.

== Early life and education ==
Nicoll was born and raised in Ludlow, Vermont. He graduated from Black River High School and earned a Bachelor of Science degree in Community and International Development from the University of Vermont in 2010.

== Career ==
Since high school, Nicoll has worked as a house builder and painter. He is also an IT and maintenance technician at the Castle Hill Resort and Spa in Proctorsville, Vermont. Nicoll served as a member of the Ludlow Selectboard from 2014 to 2019 and the Ludlow Planning Commission from 2012 to 2019. He was elected to the Vermont House of Representatives in November 2018 and assumed office on January 9, 2019.

During his first term in the Vermont House, Nicoll served as a member of the House Human Services Committee and House Canvassing Committee. In January 2022, he co-sponsored legislation, with Selene Colburn, that would decriminalize drug possession in Vermont. If passed, possession of illicit drugs would be punished with fines instead of jail time. The bill would also establish a Drug Use Standards Advisory Board.

In the 2024 Vermont House of Representatives election, Nicoll was unseated by Republican Kevin C. Winter.

== Personal life ==
Nicoll and his wife had their first child in December 2020 and their second in June 2022.
