= Shawn Sweeney (Vermont politician) =

American politician from Vermont

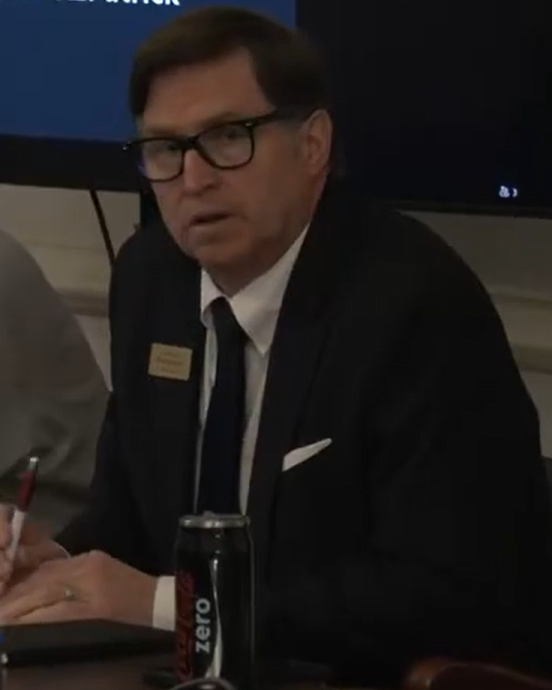
- Sweeney in 2026

Member of the Vermont House of Representatives from the Chittenden 7 district
- Incumbent
- Assumed office January 8, 2025
- Preceded by: Jessica Brumsted

Personal details
- Party: Democratic
- Education: University of Houston

Shawn Sweeney is an American politician from Vermont. He has been a Democratic member of the Vermont House of Representatives for the Chittenden 7 District since 2025.

Sweeney is a business owner in Shelburne, Vermont. He owns and operates Sweeney DesignBuild.
