= Phoebe Tucker =

American politician

Member-elect of the Vermont House of Representatives from the Rutland-Windsor district
- Assuming office January 2027
- Succeeding: Kevin C. Winter

Personal details
- Party: Democratic

Phoebe Tucker is an American politician. A member of the Democratic Party, she is the member-elect for the Rutland-Windsor district of the Vermont House of Representatives. Tucker previously served on the Planning Commission for the town of Ludlow. She works as a landscaper and herbalist.
