= Kleppner =

Kleppner is a surname. Notable people with the surname include:

- Bram Kleppner, American politician
- Daniel Kleppner (1932 – 2025), American physicist
- Susan Folkman (née Kleppner, born 1938), American psychologist
