= Katherine Sims =

American politician and member of the Vermont State House of Representatives

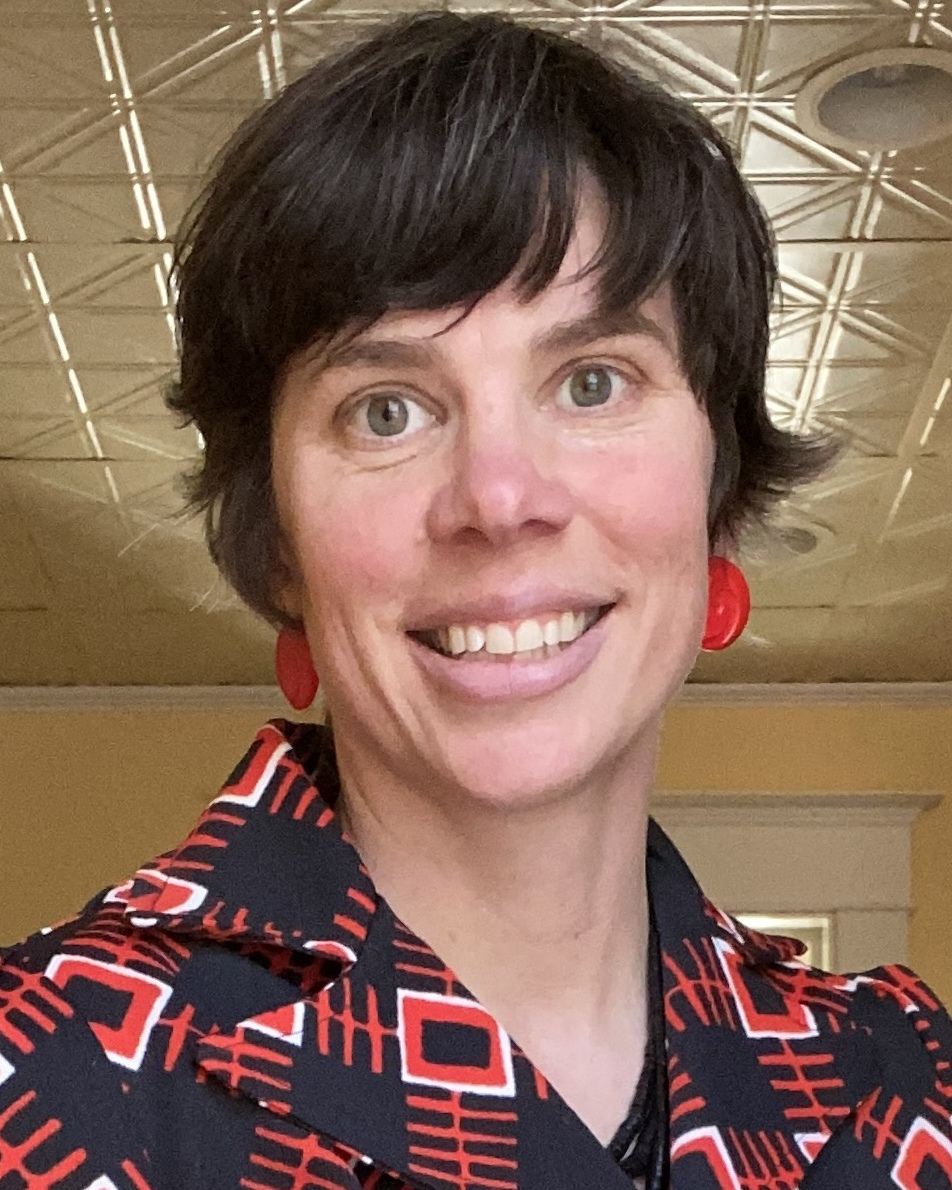

Member of the Vermont House of Representatives from the Orleans-4 district
- In office 2021–2025
- Succeeded by: Leanne Harple

Personal details
- Born: Boston, Massachusetts, U.S.
- Party: Democratic
- Children: 2
- Education: Yale University (BA)

Katherine Sims is an American politician who served in the Vermont House of Representatives from 2021 to 2025.

== Early life and career ==
Katherine Sims was born in Massachusetts and graduated from Yale University with a bachelor's in history. She is married to Jeff Fellinger and has two kids.

In 2007, she founded the nonprofit Green Mountain Farm-to-School, which advocated for local farms and childhood nutrition. In 2017 she was hired as Director of the Northeast Kingdom Collaborative.

== Vermont House of Representatives ==
In 2020, Katherine Sims ran for one of the two House seats for the ORL-CAL legislative district after Samuel Young announced his leave.

In 2022, with the redistricting, ORL-CAL went from a seven town, multimember district, to the Orleans-4 district with four towns, and two incumbents running for one seat. Sims won with 61% of the votes.

== Vermont Senate ==
On April 29, 2024, Sims announced her candidacy for Vermont Senate, following the news of retirement from Robert A. Starr. She was defeated in the general election by Republican Samuel Douglass.
