= Martha Feltus =

American politician

Member of the Vermont House of Representatives from the Caledonia-3 district
- Incumbent
- Assumed office January 8, 2025 Serving with Beth Quimby

Member of the Vermont House of Representatives from the Caledonia-4 district
- In office January 2013 – January 2023 Serving with Patrick Seymour
- Preceded by: Howard Crawford

Member of the Lyndon Select Board
- In office 1997–2018

Personal details
- Born: Kansas City, Missouri, U.S.
- Party: Republican
- Spouse: Stephen Feltus
- Education: Beloit College (BA)

Martha "Marty" Feltus is an American politician from Vermont. She serves in the Vermont House of Representatives. From 1980 to 1997 she served on the Lyndonville, Vermont planning commission, zoning board of appeals, and as a village trustee. From 1997 to 2018 she was on the village's select board. Feltus was first elected to the Vermont House of Representatives in 2012, and served until 2023. She was re-elected to the assembly for the 2025 session. She previously worked for Weidmann Electrical Technology.

== Biography ==
Feltus was born in Kansas City, Missouri, and was educated in Tulsa, Oklahoma, at Will Rogers High School. She received a Bachelor of Arts in Spanish from Beloit College in Wisconsin. She moved to Lyndon, Vermont in 1977 and worked at Weidmann Electrical Technology for twenty-seven years in sales and customer management. From 1980 to 1997 she served on the Lyndonville, Vermont planning commission and zoning board of appeals. Feltus was a trustee of Lyndonville for five years, from 1992 to 1997. In 1997 she joined the village's select board.

In 2012 Feltus was elected to the Vermont House of Representatives, representing the district of Caledonia-4 as a Republican with Patrick Seymour. She has served on the House Appropriations Committee, the House Sexual Harassment Prevention Panel, and the Working Group on Water Quality Funding. Feltus announced in 2018 that she did not intend to seek reelection to the Lyndon select board, which she had served on for over twenty years.

Feltus has two children with her husband, Stephen.

Vermont House of Representatives
Preceded by Howard Crawford	Vermont Representative from the Caledonia-4 District; 2012–present Served alongside: Richard Lawrence, Patrick Seymour	Succeeded by Incumbent
