= Richard M. Nelson =

American politician from Vermont

Member of the Vermont House of Representatives from the Orleans 1 district
- Incumbent
- Assumed office January 8, 2025
- Preceded by: Brian Smith

Personal details
- Party: Republican

Richard M. Nelson is an American politician from Vermont. He has been a Republican member of the Vermont House of Representatives for the Orleans 1 District since 2025.
