= Gayle Pezzo =

American politician from Vermont

Member of the Vermont House of Representatives from the Chittenden 20 district
- Incumbent
- Assumed office January 8, 2025
- Preceded by: Seth Chase

Personal details
- Born: Long Beach, New York
- Party: Democratic
- Website: www.pezzo4vthouse.com

Gayle Pezzo is an American politician from Vermont. She has been a Democratic member of the Vermont House of Representatives for the Chittenden 20 District since 2025. Pezzo worked 30 years in the mental health field.
