= Dara Torre =

American politician from Vermont

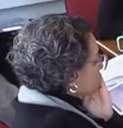

Member of the Vermont House of Representatives from the Washington 2 district
- Incumbent
- Assumed office January 4, 2023 Serving with Kari Dolan
- Preceded by: Maxine Grad

Personal details
- Party: Democratic
- Education: Oberlin College

Dara Torre is an American politician from Vermont. She has been a Democratic member of the Vermont House of Representatives for the Washington 2 District since 2023.
