= Josie Leavitt =

American politician from Vermont

- Leavitt in 2024

Member of the Vermont House of Representatives from the Grand Isle-Chittenden district
- Incumbent
- Assumed office January 4, 2023 Serving with Michael Morgan
- Preceded by: Leland Morgan

Personal details
- Party: Democratic
- Education: Columbia University
- Josie Leavitt's voice Josie Leavitt introducing herself in a meeting of the House Agricultural committee Recorded February 21, 2024

Josie Leavitt is an American politician from Vermont. She has been a Democratic member of the Vermont House of Representatives for the Grand Isle-Chittenden District since 2023.
