= Doug Bishop =

American politician from Vermont

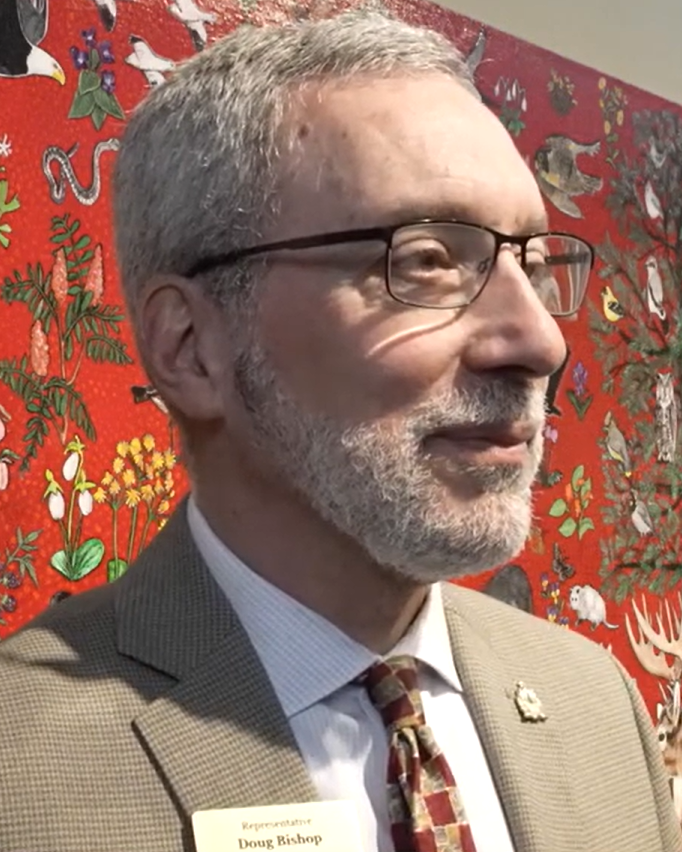
- Bishop in 2025

Member of the Vermont House of Representatives from the Chittenden 20 district
- Incumbent
- Assumed office January 8, 2025
- Preceded by: Curt Taylor

Personal details
- Born: New Jersey
- Party: Democratic
- Education: University of Vermont
- Website: www.bishopforvermont.com

Doug Bishop is an American politician from Vermont. He has been a Democratic member of the Vermont House of Representatives for the Chittenden 20 District since 2025.

Bishop previously worked for United States Senator Patrick Leahy.
