= Wendy Critchlow =

American politician from Vermont

Member of the Vermont House of Representatives from the Chittenden 19 district
- Incumbent
- Assumed office January 8, 2025
- Preceded by: Patrick Brennan

Personal details
- Party: Democratic
- Education: University of Vermont
- Website: echidna-wolf-dysr.squarespace.com

Wendy Critchlow is an American politician from Vermont. She has been a Democratic member of the Vermont House of Representatives for the Chittenden 19 District since 2025.
