= Brian Smith (Vermont politician) =

American politician and member of the Vermont State House of Representatives

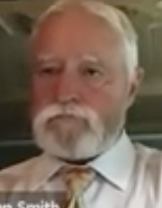
- Smith in 2020

Member of the Vermont House of Representatives from the Orange-1 District
- In office 2017 – January 8, 2025
- Succeeded by: Richard M. Nelson

Personal details
- Born: Newport, Vermont, U.S.
- Party: Republican

Brian Smith is an American politician who served in the Vermont House of Representatives from 2017 to 2025.
