= Butch Shaw =

American politician

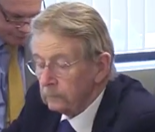
- Shaw in 2024

Member of the Vermont House of Representatives from the Rutland-6 district
- In office 2011 – January 8, 2025
- Succeeded by: Alicia Malay

Personal details
- Born: January 8, 1948 (age 78) Middlebury, Vermont, U.S.
- Party: Republican
- Profession: electrician and traffic signal technician

Charles "Butch" Shaw (born January 8, 1948) is an American politician in the state of Vermont. He was a member of the Vermont House of Representatives, sitting as a Republican from the Rutland-6 district, having been first elected in 2010.
