= Robert Hunter (American politician) =

American politician (born 1964)

Member of the Vermont House of Representatives from the Bennington 4 district
- Incumbent
- Assumed office January 8, 2025

Personal details
- Born: 1964 (age 61–62) Syracuse, New York, US
- Party: Democratic
- Education: Hartwick College

Robert Hunter (born 1964) is an American politician from Vermont. He has been a Democratic member of the Vermont House of Representatives for the Bennington 4 District since 2025.
