= Curt Taylor =

American politician and member of the Vermont State House of Representatives

Member of the Vermont House of Representatives from the Chittenden 9-1 district district
- In office 2017–2025
- Succeeded by: Doug Bishop

Personal details
- Born: Fort Monmouth, New Jersey, U.S.
- Party: Democratic
- Children: 1
- Education: Beloit College (BA); Washington State University (BS)

Curt Taylor is an American politician who served in the Vermont House of Representatives from 2017 to 2025. Since 2023, he has served alongside Seth Chase.
