= Candice White =

American politician from Vermont

Member of the Vermont House of Representatives from the Washington 2 district
- Incumbent
- Assumed office January 8, 2025
- Preceded by: Kari Dolan

Personal details
- Born: Clinton, New York
- Party: Democratic
- Education: Boston College
- Website: candicewhite4vt.com

Candice White is an American politician from Vermont. She has been a Democratic member of the Vermont House of Representatives for the Washington 2 District since 2025.
