= Chip Troiano =

American politician and member of the Vermont State House of Representatives

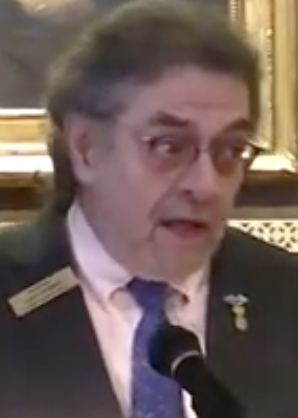
- Troiano in 2020

Member of the Vermont House of Representatives from the Caledonia-2 district
- Incumbent
- Assumed office 2014
- Succeeded by: Michael Southworth (elect)

Personal details
- Born: Staten Island, New York
- Party: Democratic
- Children: 1
- Education: Fashion Institute of Technology Lyndon State College (BA)

Joseph "Chip" Troiano is an American politician who has served in the Vermont House of Representatives since 2014.

== Biography ==
Chip Troiano was born in Staten Island, New York. He attended New Dorp High School, studied photography at the Fashion Institute of Technology and Social Sciences at Lyndon State College.

Troiano served a combat tour in Vietnam from 1966 to 1967. He was a air mobile Infantryman. He worked as a criminal defense investigator until retirement at 2015.

He is married to his wife Regina, and they have one daughter.

== Vermont House of Representatives ==
Troiano ran for the Vermont House of Representatives Caledonia-2 district in 2014 against Republican Lawrence Hamel, and won with 53.4% of the vote. He has won every election since.

He serves as Vice Chair on the House Committee on Corrections and Institutions, and as Vice Chair on the Joint Committee on Judicial Retention.
