= Chris Pritchard (politician) =

American politician

Member of the Vermont House of Representatives from the Rutland-Bennington district
- Incumbent
- Assumed office January 8, 2025
- Preceded by: Robin Chesnut-Tangerman

Personal details
- Born: Burlington, Vermont
- Party: Republican
- Education: Poultney High School

Christopher A. Pritchard is an American politician. He serves as a Republican member for the Rutland-Bennington district of the Vermont House of Representatives.

In the 2024 Vermont House of Representatives election he defeated Robin Chesnut-Tangerman. Pritchard is a sports shooting coach for a local 4-H club, and was twice selected to coach the Vermont Shotgun Team at the National 4-H Shooting Sports Championships in Grand Island, Nebraska.
