= Esme Cole =

American politician

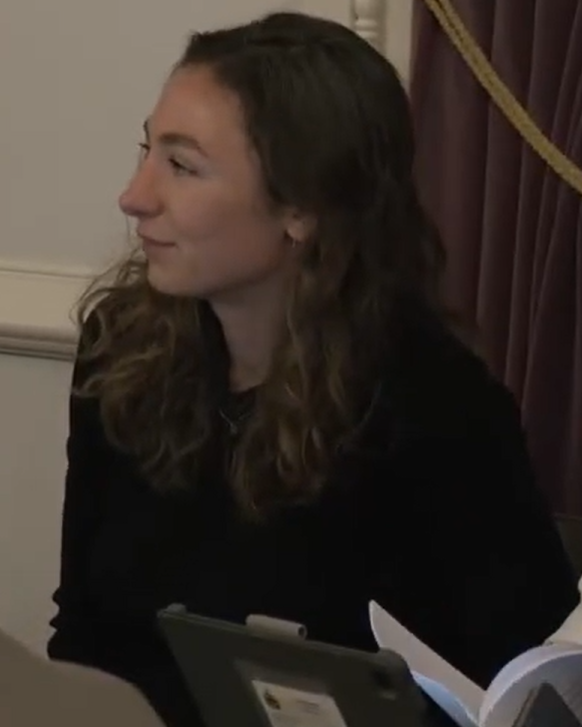
- Cole in 2026

Member of the Vermont House of Representatives from the Windsor-6 district
- Incumbent
- Assumed office January 4, 2023

Personal details
- Born: December 3, 1996 (age 29)
- Party: Democratic
- Education: Kenyon College; Universidad San Francisco de Quito; University of Vermont Graduate School
- Esme Cole's voice Esme Cole introducing herself in a meeting of the House Agricultural committee Recorded February 21, 2024

Esme Cole is an American politician. She serves as a Democratic member and Vermont Progressive Party member for the Windsor-6 district of the Vermont House of Representatives.

== Life and career ==
Cole attended Hartford High School, Kenyon College, the Universidad San Francisco de Quito and the University of Vermont Graduate School.

In August 2022, Cole and incumbent Kevin Christie defeated Nicholas Bramlage in the Democratic primary election for the Windsor-6 district of the Vermont House of Representatives. In November 2022, she was elected along with Christie in the general election. She assumed office in 2023.
