= Alicia Malay =

American politician from Vermont

Member of the Vermont House of Representatives from the Rutland 8 district
- Incumbent
- Assumed office January 8, 2025
- Preceded by: Butch Shaw

Personal details
- Party: Republican

Alicia Malay is an American politician from Vermont. She has been a Republican member of the Vermont House of Representatives for the Rutland 8 District since 2025.
