= Edward Waszazak =

American politician from Vermont

Member of the Vermont House of Representatives from the Washington 3 district
- Incumbent
- Assumed office January 8, 2025

Personal details
- Party: Democratic

Edward "Teddy" Waszazak is an American politician from Vermont. He has been a Democratic member of the Vermont House of Representatives for the Washington 3 District since 2025. He was a member of Barre City Council.
