= Caleb Elder =

American politician and member of the Vermont State House of Representatives

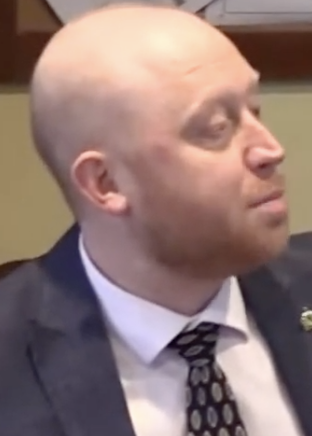
- Elder in 2020

Member of the Vermont House of Representatives from the Addison-4 district
- In office January 9, 2019 – January 8, 2025
- Succeeded by: Herb Olson

Personal details
- Born: Starksboro, Vermont, U.S.
- Party: Democratic
- Education: Middlebury College (BA)

Caleb Elder is an American politician. He served in the Vermont House of Representatives from 2019 to 2025.
