= Avram Patt =

American politician from Vermont

Member of the Vermont House of Representatives from the Lamoille-Washington District district
- Incumbent
- Assumed office January 9, 2019 Serving with Saudia LaMont

Personal details
- Party: Democratic

Avram Patt is an American politician from Vermont. He was a Democratic member of the Vermont House of Representatives for the Lamoille-Washington District from 2015–16 and 2019-24.
