= Seth Chase =

American politician from Vermont

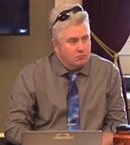

Member of the Vermont House of Representatives from the Chittenden-20 District district
- In office January 9, 2019 – January 8, 2025 Serving with Curt Taylor
- Preceded by: Jim Condon
- Succeeded by: Gayle Pezzo

Personal details
- Party: Democratic
- Education: University of Vermont

Seth Chase is an American politician from Vermont. He was first elected to the Vermont House of Representatives for the Chittenden-9-1 District in November 2018. After redistricting in 2022, Chittenden-9-1 became Chittenden-20.

Chase is a United States Army veteran and a graduate of the University of Vermont.
