= Herb Olson =

American politician from Vermont

Member of the Vermont House of Representatives from the Addison 4 district
- Incumbent
- Assumed office January 8, 2025
- Preceded by: Caleb Elder

Personal details
- Born: 1951 (age 74–75) Mineola, New York
- Party: Democratic
- Education: Middlebury College
- Alma mater: Northwestern University Pritzker School of Law

Herb Olson (born 1951) is an American politician from Vermont. He has been a Democratic member of the Vermont House of Representatives for the Addison 4 District since 2025.

== Personal life ==
Olson and his wife live in Starksboro, Vermont.
