= Bridget Burkhardt =

American politician

Member of the Vermont House of Representatives from the Chittenden-8 district
- Incumbent
- Assumed office January 8, 2025
- Preceded by: Noah Hyman

Personal details
- Party: Democratic
- Education: Brown University; Harvard Business School
- Website: sites.google.com/view/burkhardtforvt/home

Bridget Marie Burkhardt is an American politician. She serves as a Democratic member for the Chittenden-8 district of the Vermont House of Representatives since 2025.
