= Leanne Harple =

American politician from Vermont

Member of the Vermont House of Representatives from the Orleans 4 district
- Incumbent
- Assumed office January 8, 2025
- Preceded by: Katherine Sims

Personal details
- Born: Glover, Vermont
- Party: Democratic
- Website: harpleforhouse.com

Leanne Harple is an American politician from Vermont. She has been a Democratic member of the Vermont House of Representatives for the Orleans 4 District since 2025.

== Career ==
Harple is a former member of the Glover Select Board. She is a public school teacher.

== Personal life ==
Harple is from Glover, Vermont. Harple is the mother of four children.
