= Arthur Peterson (Vermont politician) =

American politician

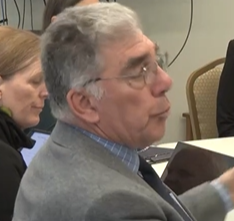
- Peterson in 2024

Member of the Vermont House of Representatives from the Rutland-2 district
- Incumbent
- Assumed office January 6, 2021
- Succeeded by: David Bosch (elect)

Personal details
- Party: Republican

Arthur (Art) Peterson is an American politician from Vermont. He is a Republican member of the Vermont House of Representatives.

== Career ==
He was first elected at the 2020 Vermont House of Representatives election, defeating the Democratic incumbent.
