= Henry Pearl =

American politician

Member of the Vermont House of Representatives from the Caledonia-Washington-1 district
- Incumbent
- Assumed office January 6, 2021
- Preceded by: Catherine Toll
- Succeeded by: Greg Burtt (elect)

Personal details
- Party: Democratic
- Spouse: Allison
- Children: 2
- Education: Vermont Technical College (AS); University of Vermont (BS)

Henry Pearl is an American politician and farmer serving as a member of the Vermont House of Representatives for the Caledonia-Washington-1. Elected in November 2020, he assumed office on January 6, 2021.

== Early life and education ==
Pearl is a seventh-generation native of Vermont. He earned an associate degree from Vermont Technical College and a Bachelor of Science in community development and applied economics from the University of Vermont.

== Career ==
Outside of politics, Pearl operate's his family's dairy farm. He was elected to the Vermont House of Representatives in November 2020 and assumed office on January 6, 2021. Pearl is also a member of the House Agriculture and Forestry Committee.
