= Kate Nugent =

American politician from Vermont

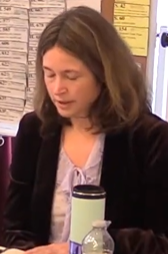
- Nugent in 2024

Member of the Vermont House of Representatives from the Chittenden-10 district
- Incumbent
- Assumed office January 4, 2023
- Preceded by: Maida Townsend

Personal details
- Born: Melrose, Massachusetts
- Party: Democratic
- Education: Sacred Heart High School, Kingston, MA
- Alma mater: Colgate University; University of South Carolina

Kate Nugent is an American politician from Vermont. She has been a Democratic member of the Vermont House of Representatives for the Chittenden-10 District since 2023.
