= Chris Taylor (Vermont politician) =

American politician from Vermont

Member of the Vermont House of Representatives from the Chittenden-Franklin district
- In office January 4, 2023 – March 27, 2026
- Preceded by: John Palasik
- Succeeded by: Kumulia Long

Personal details
- Born: Rutland, Vermont
- Party: Republican

Christopher (Chris) Taylor is an American politician from Vermont. He served as a Republican member of the Vermont House of Representatives for the Chittenden-Franklin District from 2023 to 2026.
