= Abbey Duke =

American politician

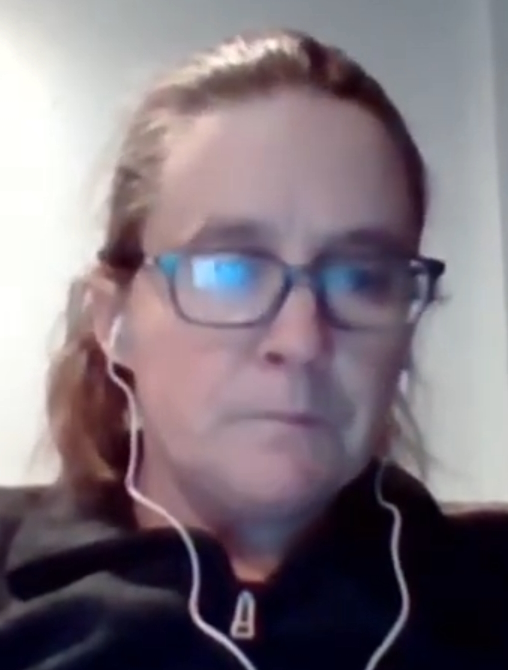

Member of the Vermont House of Representatives from the Chittenden-17 district
- Incumbent
- Assumed office May 6, 2024
- Preceded by: Emma Mulvaney-Stanak

Personal details
- Political party: Democratic

Abbey Duke is an American politician. She has served as a member of the Vermont House of Representatives since 2024, representing Chittenden-17. She is a member of the Democratic Party.
