= Penny Demar =

American politician from Vermont

Member of the Vermont House of Representatives from the Franklin 7 district
- Incumbent
- Assumed office January 4, 2023
- Preceded by: Felisha Leffler

Personal details
- Born: 1952 (age 73–74) St. Albans, Vermont
- Party: Republican

Allen R. "Penny" Demar (born 1952) is an American politician from Vermont. He has been a Republican member of the Vermont House of Representatives for the Franklin 7 District since 2023.
