= David Durfee =

American politician from Vermont

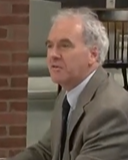
- Durfee in 2024

Member of the Vermont House of Representatives from the Bennington 3 district
- Incumbent
- Assumed office 2019

Personal details
- Party: Democratic
- David Durfee's voice David Durfee introducing himself in a meeting of the House Agricultural committee Recorded February 21, 2024

David Durfee is an American politician from Vermont. He has been a Democratic member of the Vermont House of Representatives for the Bennington-3 District since 2019.
