= John Bartholomew (Vermont politician) =

American politician and member of the Vermont State House of Representatives

Member of the Vermont House of Representatives from the Windsor-1 District
- Incumbent
- Assumed office 2011

Personal details
- Born: Philadelphia, Pennsylvania, U.S.
- Party: Democratic
- Children: 1
- Education: University of Oklahoma; Oklahoma State University (BS, DVM)

John Bartholomew is an American politician who has served in the Vermont House of Representatives since 2011. He is a retired veterinarian.
