= VL Coffin IV =

American politician

Member of the Vermont House of Representatives from the Windsor-2 district
- Incumbent
- Assumed office January 8, 2025
- Preceded by: John Arrison

Personal details
- Party: Republican

VL Coffin IV is an American politician. He is the member for the Windsor-2 district of the Vermont House of Representatives.

Originally from Biddeford, Maine, Coffin moved with his family to New Jersey as a child. He then joined the United States Army in 1990 and was subsequently stationed in Germany. During his stay, he helped found a children's home in Regensburg.
