= Kari Dolan =

American politician from Vermont

Member of the Vermont House of Representatives from the Washington-2 District district
- In office January 4, 2023 – January 8, 2025
- Preceded by: Ed Read
- Succeeded by: Candice White

Personal details
- Party: Democratic
- Education: University of California, Berkeley; Princeton University

Katherine "Kari" Dolan is an American politician from Vermont. She was a Democratic member of the Vermont House of Representatives for the Washington-2 District from 2023 to 2025.
