= Saudia LaMont =

American politician from Vermont

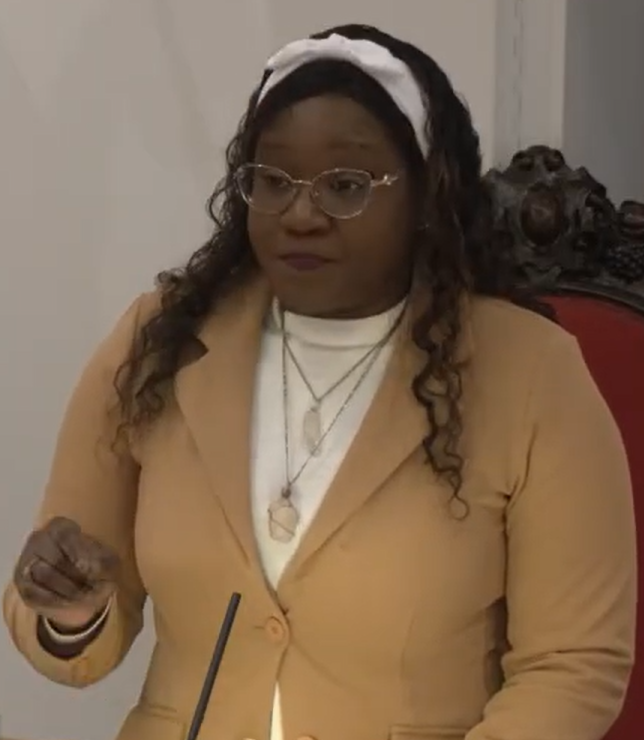
- LaMont in 2026

Member of the Vermont House of Representatives from the Lamoille-Washington District district
- Incumbent
- Assumed office January 4, 2023 Serving with Avram Patt
- Preceded by: David Yacovone

Personal details
- Party: Democratic
- Education: Cornell University

Saudia LaMont is an American politician from Vermont. She has been a Democratic member of the Vermont House of Representatives for the Lamoille-Washington District since 2023.
