= Chea Waters Evans =

American politician from Vermont

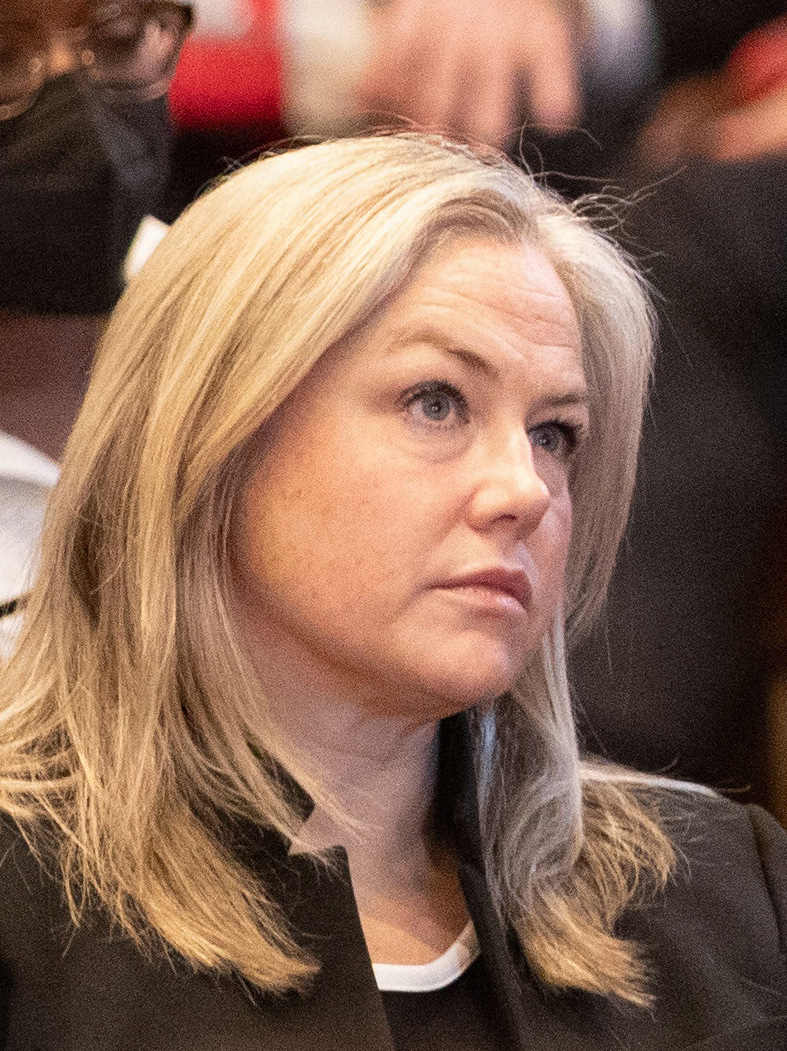
- Evans in 2026

Member of the Vermont House of Representatives from the Chittenden-5 district
- Incumbent
- Assumed office January 4, 2023
- Preceded by: Constituency established

Personal details
- Party: Democratic
- Education: Champlain Valley Union High School
- Alma mater: St. Lawrence University; City College of New York

Chea Waters Evans is an American politician from Vermont. She has been a Democratic member of the Vermont House of Representatives for the Chittenden-5 District since 2023.
