= Noah Hyman =

American politician from Vermont

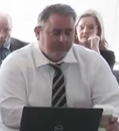
- Hyman in 2024

Member of the Vermont House of Representatives from the Chittenden 8 district
- Incumbent
- Assumed office January 4, 2023
- Preceded by: constituency established

Personal details
- Born: Philadelphia, Pennsylvania
- Party: Democratic

Noah Hyman is an American politician from Vermont. He has been a Democratic member of the Vermont House of Representatives for the Chittenden 8 District since 2023.
