= Todd Nielsen =

American politician

Member of the Vermont House of Representatives from the Rutland-9 district
- Incumbent
- Assumed office January 8, 2025
- Preceded by: Stephanie Jerome

Personal details
- Party: Republican
- Website: todd4vt.com

Todd Nielsen is an American politician. He serves as a Republican member for the Rutland-3 district of the Vermont House of Representatives.
