= Christopher Morrow =

American politician

Member of the Vermont House of Representatives from the Windham-Windsor-Bennington district
- Incumbent
- Assumed office January 8, 2025
- Preceded by: Kelly Pajala

Personal details
- Party: Democratic

Christopher Morrow is an American politician. He is the member-elect for the Windham-Windsor-Bennington district of the Vermont House of Representatives.
