= Larry Labor =

American politician from Vermont

Member of the Vermont House of Representatives from the Essex-Orleans District district
- Incumbent
- Assumed office January 4, 2023

Personal details
- Party: Republican

Larry Labor is an American politician from Vermont. He has been a Republican member of the Vermont House of Representatives for the Essex-Orleans District since 2023.

In 2021, Governor Phil Scott appointed Labor to fill the Orleans-1 House District seat vacancy created by Lynn Batchelor.
