= Edye Graning =

American politician

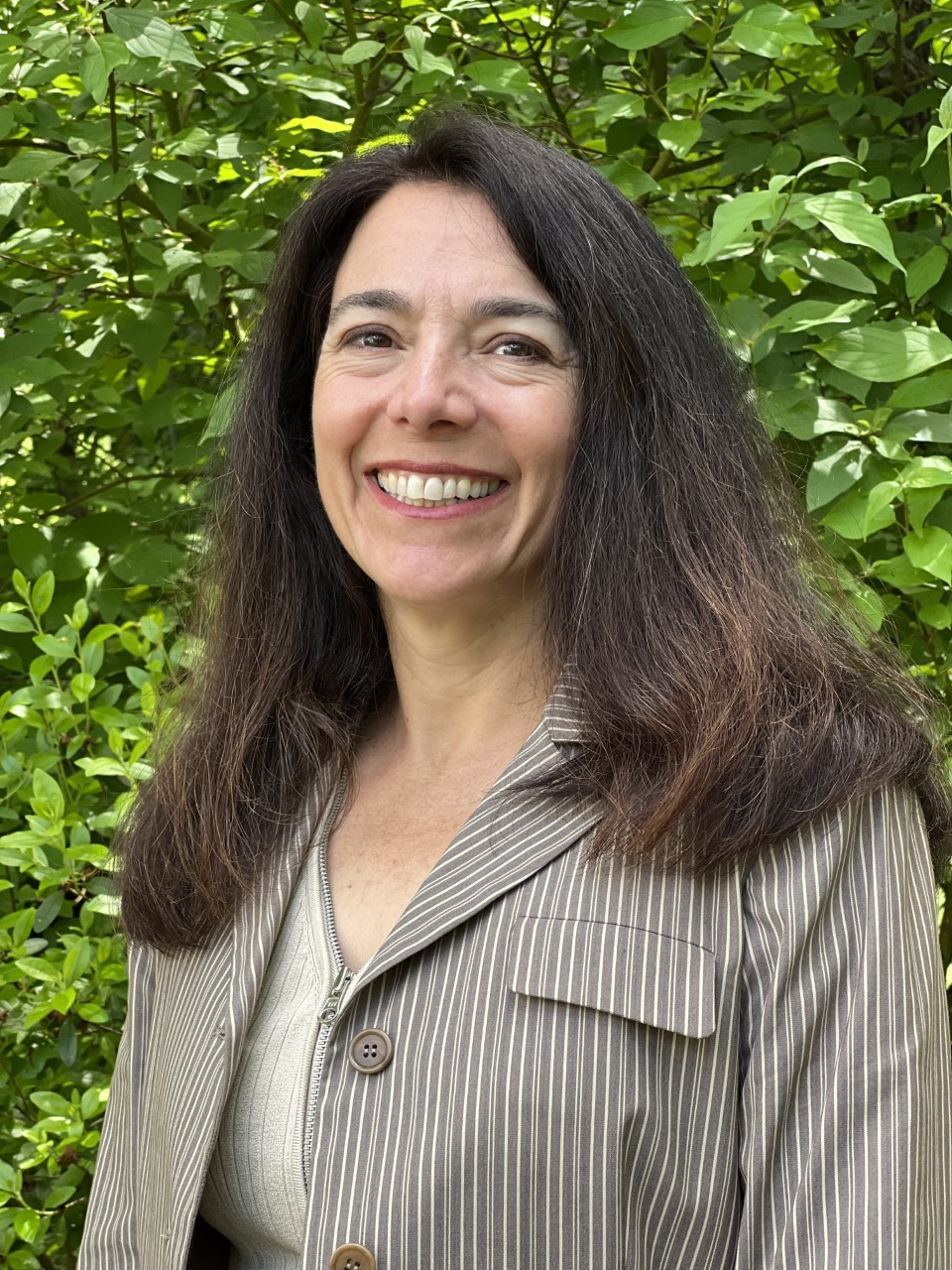
- Graning in 2022

Member of the Vermont House of Representatives from the Chittenden-3 district
- Incumbent
- Assumed office January 4, 2023

Personal details
- Born: Detroit, Michigan, U.S.

Edye Graning is an American Democratic politician who was elected to the Vermont House of Representatives in 2022. From 2020 to 2026 she served as chair of the Mount Mansfield Unified Union School District board.
