= Greg Burtt =

American politician

Member of the Vermont House of Representatives from the Caledonia-Washington district
- Incumbent
- Assumed office January 8, 2025
- Preceded by: Henry Pearl

Personal details
- Party: Republican

Greg Burtt is an American politician. He serves as a Republican member for the Caledonia-Washington district of the Vermont House of Representatives.

Burtt was born in Cabot and attended the University of Vermont, receiving a bachelor's degree in mechanical engineering. After graduating, he started Burtt's Apple Orchard.
