= Kenneth Goslant =

American politician

Kenneth Goslant is an American politician. He has served in the Vermont House of Representatives from the Washington-1 district since 2019 as a Republican.
