= Phil Pouech =

American politician from Vermont

Member of the Vermont House of Representatives from the Chittenden-4 District district
- Incumbent
- Assumed office January 4, 2023
- Preceded by: Bill Lippert (Chittenden-4-2 district)

Personal details
- Party: Democratic

Phil Pouech (born 1957) is an American politician from Vermont. He has been a Democratic member of the Vermont House of Representatives for the Chittenden-4 District since 2023.
