= Chloe Tomlinson =

American politician

Member of the Vermont House of Representatives from the Chittenden-21 district
- Incumbent
- Assumed office January 8, 2025
- Preceded by: Taylor Small

Personal details
- Party: Vermont Progressive Party
- Other political affiliations: Democratic

Chloe Tomlinson is an American politician. She serves as a member for the Chittenden-21 district of the Vermont House of Representatives.
