= Marc Mihaly =

American politician

Member of the Vermont House of Representatives from the Washington-6 district
- Incumbent
- Assumed office 2022

Personal details
- Party: Democratic
- Education: Harvard College; UC Berkeley School of Law

Marc Mihaly is an American politician. He serves as a Democratic member for the Washington-6 district of the Vermont House of Representatives since 2022. He is also a professor of law at the Vermont Law and Graduate School.
