= Chris Keyser =

American politician

Member of the Vermont House of Representatives from the Rutland-7 district
- Incumbent
- Assumed office January 8, 2025
- Preceded by: William Notte

Personal details
- Born: Chelsea, Vermont
- Party: Republican
- Education: Tufts University

Chris Keyser is an American politician. He serves as a Republican member for the Rutland-7 district of the Vermont House of Representatives.

Keyser previously worked 40 years as a fuel retailer.
