= Kate Lalley =

American politician from Vermont

Member of the Vermont House of Representatives from the Chittenden-6 district
- Incumbent
- Assumed office January 4, 2023
- Preceded by: Kate Webb (redistricting); Constituency established

Personal details
- Born: Washington, D.C.
- Party: Democratic
- Education: Kenyon College
- Alma mater: University of Virginia

Kate Lalley is an American politician from Vermont. She has been a Democratic member of the Vermont House of Representatives for the Chittenden-6 District since 2023.

Lalley is a Shelburne board member and a landscape architect.
