= David Yacovone =

American politician and member of the Vermont State House of Representatives

Member of the Vermont House of Representatives from the Lamoille-Washington District
- Incumbent
- Assumed office January 8, 2025
- In office 2017–2023
- Succeeded by: Saudia LaMont

Personal details
- Born: March 12, 1954 (age 72) Springfield, Massachusetts, U.S.
- Party: Democratic
- Children: 2
- Education: Johnson State College (BA)

David Yacovone (born March 12, 1954) is an American politician who has served in the Vermont House of Representatives since 2025. He served a previous term from 2017 to 2023.
