= Kate Logan =

American politician

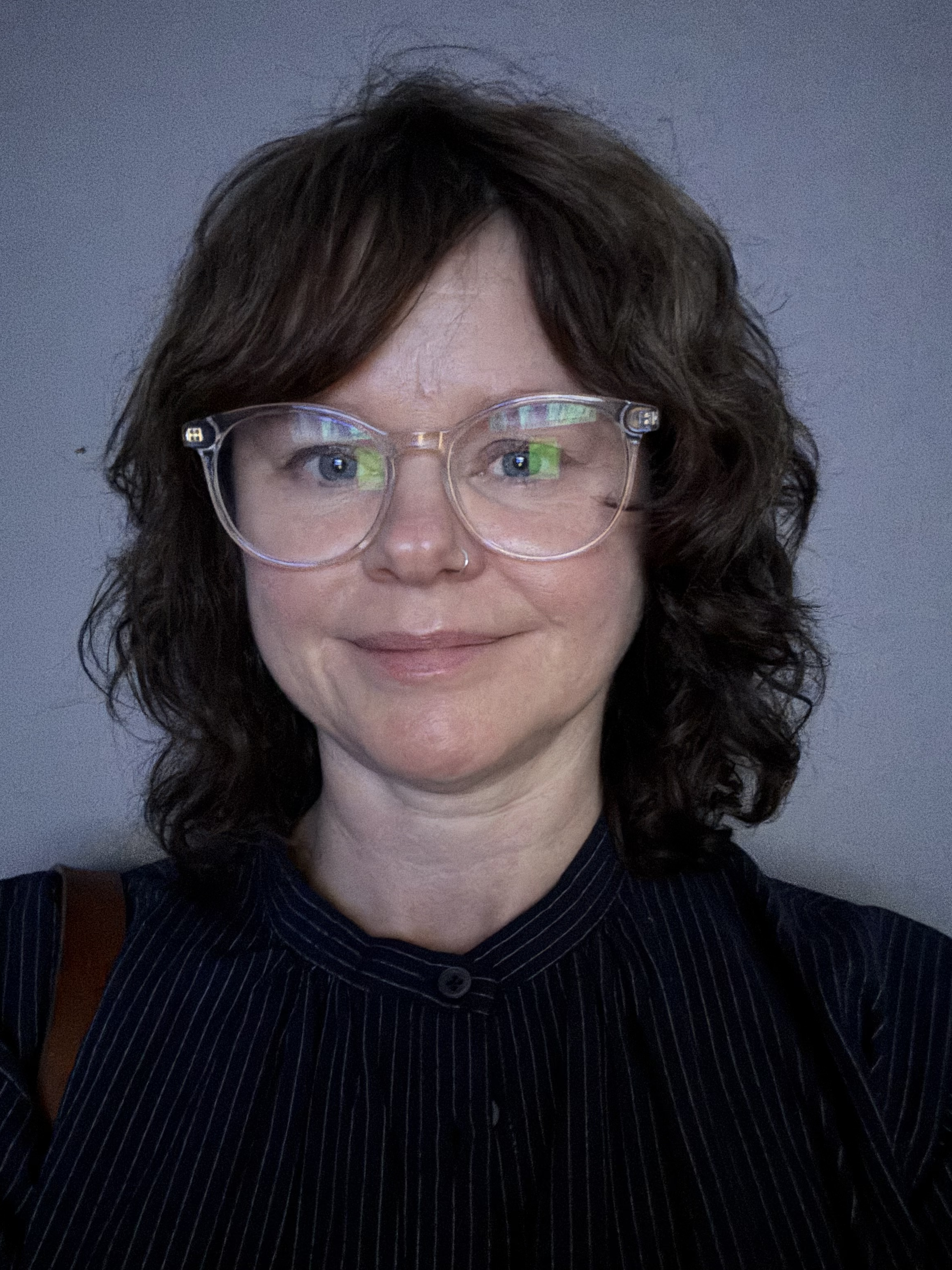

Leader of the House Progressive Caucus in the Vermont House of Representatives
- Incumbent
- Assumed office December 16, 2024
- Deputy: Brian Cina
- Preceded by: Emma Mulvaney-Stanak

Member of the Vermont House of Representatives from the Chittenden-16 district
- Incumbent
- Assumed office January 4, 2023 Serving with Jill Krowinski
- Preceded by: Curt McCormack

Personal details
- Born: Katherine Logan Chicago, Illinois
- Party: Vermont Progressive
- Other political affiliations: Democratic Socialists of America and Democratic
- Education: University of Oregon (Master of Arts, Philosophy)

Kate Logan is an American nonprofit executive and politician who serves in the Vermont House of Representatives representing the Chittenden-16 district. She was elected in 2022 alongside Jill Krowinski, affiliated with the Vermont Progressive Party and Vermont Democratic Party, and assumed office in January 2023.

== Early life and education ==
Logan was born in Chicago, Illinois and graduated from the University of Oregon with a Bachelor of Philosophy in 2009 as a McNair Scholar and a graduate degree in social and political philosophy in 2017, being the first person in her family to obtain a college degree. She moved to Vermont in 2013 and obtained a Master of Public Administration degree from the University of Vermont in 2015.

== Political career and activism ==
=== Nonprofit executive ===
Since August 2022, Logan has been director of the Vermont Coalition of Runaway and Homeless Youth Programs. She previously worked for Rights & Democracy as Director of Programming and Policy.

=== State House ===
==== 2022 election ====
Logan was elected as a member of the Vermont House of Representatives with the backing of the Progressive Party and Democratic Party alongside Democrat Jill Krowinski. She received a total of 45.0% of the vote and assumed office on January 4, 2023. During her tenure, she oversaw a card check for Ben & Jerry's employees in Burlington during the unionization process.
