= Zon Eastes =

American politician

Member of the Vermont House of Representatives from the Windham-1 district
- Incumbent
- Assumed office January 8, 2025
- Preceded by: Sara Coffey

Personal details
- Party: Democratic

Zon Eastes is an American politician. He serves as a Democratic member for the Windham-1 district of the Vermont House of Representatives.
