= Eric Maguire =

American politician from Vermont

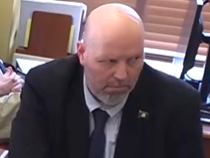
- Maguire in 2024

Member of the Vermont House of Representatives from the Rutland 5 district
- Incumbent
- Assumed office January 4, 2023

Personal details
- Born: Hyannis, Massachusetts
- Party: Republican
- Education: Liberty University

Eric Maguire is an American politician from Vermont. He has been a Republican member of the Vermont House of Representatives for the Rutland 5 district since 2023.
