= Anthony Micklus =

American politician

Member of the Vermont House of Representatives from the Chittenden-Franklin district
- Incumbent
- Assumed office January 8, 2025
- Preceded by: Chris Mattos

Personal details
- Party: Republican

Anthony Micklus is an American politician. He serves as a Republican member for the Chittenden-Franklin district of the Vermont House of Representatives.
