= Michael Boutin =

American politician (born 1981)

Member of the Vermont House of Representatives from the Washington-3 district
- Incumbent
- Assumed office January 8, 2025

Personal details
- Born: 1981 (age 44–45)
- Party: Republican
- Website: www.boutinforbarre.com

Michael Boutin (born 1981) is an American politician. He serves as a Republican member for the Washington-3 district of the Vermont House of Representatives.

Boutin has lived in Barre City for 40 years. He was previously a Barre city councilor for 14 years, and is currently serving a three-year term on the Barre Unified Union School District as its chair.
