= Jessica Brumsted =

American politician and member of the Vermont State House of Representatives

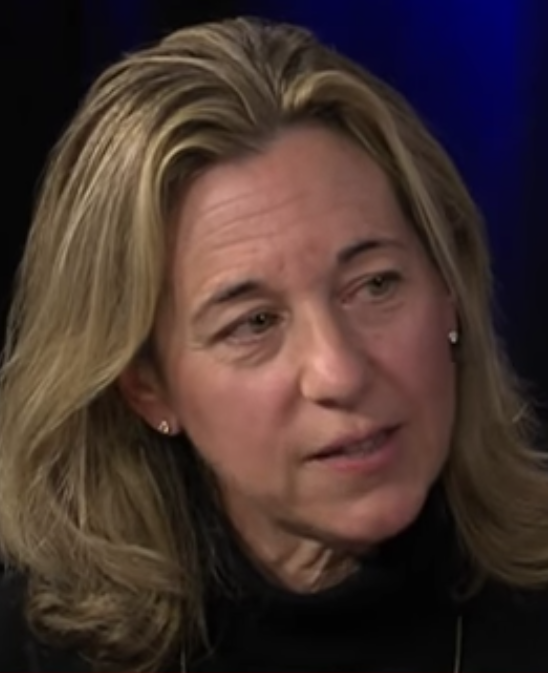
- Brumsted in 2018

Member of the U.S. House of Representatives from 's Chittenden-7 (2023 to present) Chittenden 5-2 district (2017 to 2023) district
- Incumbent
- Assumed office 2017

Personal details
- Born: Warwick, Rhode Island, U.S.
- Party: Democratic
- Children: 7
- Education: University of Vermont (BA, MPA)

Jessica Brumsted is an American politician who has served in the Vermont House of Representatives since 2017.
