= Ian Goodnow =

American politician

Member of the Vermont House of Representatives from the Windham-9 district
- Incumbent
- Assumed office January 8, 2025
- Preceded by: Tristan Toleno

Personal details
- Party: Democratic

Ian Goodnow is an American politician. He serves as a Democratic member for the Windham-9 district of the Vermont House of Representatives.
