= Jubilee McGill =

American politician

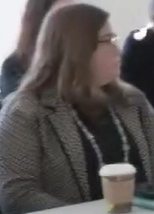
- McGill in 2024

Member of the Vermont House of Representatives from the Addison-5 district
- Incumbent
- Assumed office 2019
- Preceded by: Harvey Smith

Personal details
- Born: Middlebury, Vermont, U.S.
- Party: Democratic

Jubilee McGill is an American politician who represents Addison-5 in the Vermont House of Representatives She is a Democrat.
