= Martin LaLonde =

American politician and member of the Vermont State House of Representatives

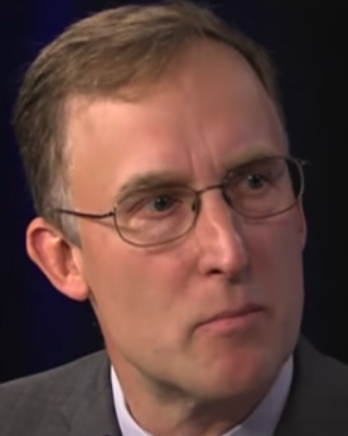
- LaLonde in 2018

Member of the Vermont House of Representatives from the Chittenden 12 district
- Incumbent
- Assumed office 2014

Personal details
- Born: Lynwood, California, U.S.
- Party: Democratic
- Children: 2
- Education: University of Michigan (BA) University of Michigan Law School
- Website: martinlalondevt.com

Martin LaLonde is an American politician who has been in the Vermont House of Representatives since 2014.
