= Thomas Oliver (Vermont politician) =

American politician from Vermont

Member of the Vermont House of Representatives from the Franklin-4 district
- Incumbent
- Assumed office January 4, 2023 Serving with Matthew Walker
- Preceded by: Robert Norris

Personal details
- Born: Amarillo, Texas
- Party: Republican
- Education: Burlington High School
- Alma mater: Champlain College

Thomas Oliver is an American politician from Vermont. He has been a Republican member of the Vermont House of Representatives for the Franklin-4 District since 2023.
