= David Bosch (politician) =

American politician

Member of the Vermont House of Representatives from the Rutland-2 district
- Incumbent
- Assumed office January 8, 2025
- Preceded by: Arthur Peterson

Personal details
- Party: Republican

David Bosch is an American politician. He is a member for the Rutland-2 district of the Vermont House of Representatives.
