= Mary Howard (politician) =

American politician from Vermont

Member of the Vermont House of Representatives from the Rutland-6 District district
- Incumbent
- Assumed office January 4, 2023

Personal details
- Party: Democratic

Mary Howard is an American politician from Vermont. She has been a Democratic member of the Vermont House of Representatives for the Rutland-6 District since 2023.
