= Brian Minier =

American politician

Member of the Vermont House of Representatives from the Chittenden 11th district
- Incumbent
- Assumed office January 4, 2023

Personal details
- Born: Omaha, Nebraska, U.S.
- Party: Democratic

Brian Minier is an American politician. He serves as a Democratic member for the Chittenden 11th district of the Vermont House of Representatives.
