= Michael Southworth =

American politician

Member of the Vermont House of Representatives from the Caledonia-2 district
- Incumbent
- Assumed office January 8, 2025
- Preceded by: Chip Troiano

Personal details
- Party: Republican

Michael Southworth is an American politician. He serves as a Republican member for the Caledonia-2 district of the Vermont House of Representatives.
