= Kristi Morris =

American politician from Vermont

Member of the Vermont House of Representatives from the Windsor-3 District district
- Incumbent
- Assumed office January 4, 2023

Personal details
- Party: Democratic

Kristi Morris is an American politician from Vermont. He has been a Democratic member of the Vermont House of Representatives for the Windsor-3 District since 2023.
