= Kevin C. Winter =

American politician

Member of the Vermont House of Representatives from the Rutland-Windsor district
- Incumbent
- Assumed office January 8, 2025
- Preceded by: Logan Nicoll
- Succeeded by: Phoebe Tucker (elect)

Personal details
- Born: St. Louis, Missouri
- Party: Republican
- Education: Alfred University
- Website: kevinwinterforvt.com

Kevin C. Winter is an American politician. He serves as a Republican member for the Rutland-Windsor district of the Vermont House of Representatives.
