= Michael Nigro =

American politician

Member of the Vermont House of Representatives from the Bennington 5 district
- Incumbent
- Assumed office January 8, 2025

Member of the Vermont House of Representatives from the Bennington 2 district
- In office January 6, 2021 – January 2023
- Preceded by: Jim Carroll
- Succeeded by: Jim Carroll

Personal details
- Party: Democratic
- Education: SUNY Geneseo; Plymouth State University

Michael Nigro is an American politician and a member of the Democratic Party who has served in the Vermont House of Representatives since 2025. He served a previous term from 2021 to 2023.

Nigro served on the House Committee on Commerce and Economic Development.
