= Jed Lipsky =

American politician from Vermont

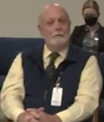
- Lipsky in 2024

Member of the Vermont House of Representatives from the Lamoille-1 district
- Incumbent
- Assumed office January 4, 2023

Personal details
- Born: Massachusetts
- Party: Independent
- Other political affiliations: Republican
- Education: University of Colorado Boulder
- Jed Lipsky's voice Jed Lipsky introducing himself in a meeting of the House Agricultural committee Recorded February 21, 2024

Jed Lipsky is an American politician from Vermont. He has been a member of the Vermont House of Representatives for the Lamoille-1 District since 2023.

== Early life and education ==
Lipsky attended University of Colorado Boulder.
