= Gina Galfetti =

American politician from Vermont

Member of the Vermont House of Representatives from the Washington-Orange district
- Incumbent
- Assumed office January 4, 2023 Serving with David Soucy
- Preceded by: Robert LaClair

Personal details
- Born: Barre, Vermont
- Party: Republican
- Education: University of Vermont

Gina Galfetti is an American politician from Vermont. She has been a Republican member of the Vermont House of Representatives for the Washington-Orange District since 2023.
