= Kate McCann (politician) =

American politician from Vermont

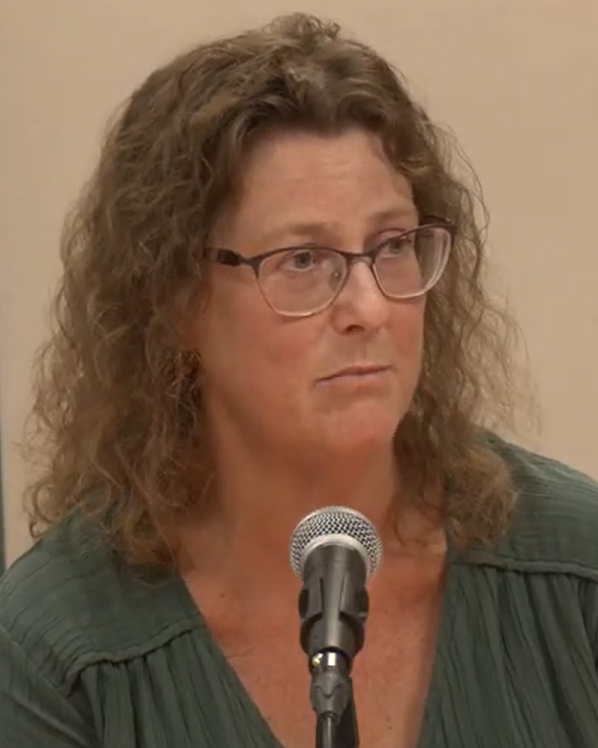
- McCann in 2026

Member of the Vermont House of Representatives from the Washington-4 district
- Incumbent
- Assumed office January 4, 2023
- Preceded by: Constituency established

Personal details
- Born: Lancaster, New Hampshire
- Party: Democratic
- Education: University of Vermont

Kate McCann is an American politician from Vermont. She has been a Democratic member of the Vermont House of Representatives for the Washington-4 District since 2023.
