= Jonathan Cooper (politician) =

American politician (born 1980)

Member of the Vermont House of Representatives from the Bennington-1 district
- Incumbent
- Assumed office January 8, 2025
- Preceded by: Nelson Brownell

Personal details
- Born: September 9, 1980 (age 45) Boston, Massachusetts, U.S.
- Party: Democratic
- Education: St. John's College (BA)

Jonathan Cooper is an American regional planner and politician serving as a member of the Vermont House of Representatives for the Bennington-1 district. Elected in November 2024 in a contest that was ultimately decided by the House of Representatives in February 2025, he assumed office on January 8, 2025.

Cooper was raised in Needham, Massachusetts, where he attained the rank of Eagle Scout in 1998. He earned a Bachelor of Arts degree from St. John's College (Annapolis), a Master of Arts from The Conway School, and a Master of Regional Planning from the University of Massachusetts Amherst.

A resident of Pownal, Vermont, Cooper moved to the area in 2016 to work at the Bennington County Regional Commission as a community and economic development planner. He currently serves on the House Committee on Commerce and Economic Development.
