= Matthew Walker (Vermont politician) =

American politician from Vermont

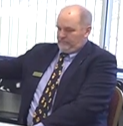
- Walker in 2024

Member of the Vermont House of Representatives from the Franklin-4 district
- Incumbent
- Assumed office February 2, 2022 Serving with Thomas Oliver
- Preceded by: Brian Savage

Personal details
- Born: Rutland, Vermont
- Party: Republican
- Education: University of Vermont

Matthew Walker is an American politician from Vermont. He has been a Republican member of the Vermont House of Representatives for the Franklin-4 District since a special election in 2022. He was re-elected in the 2022 general election.
