= Conor Casey (politician) =

American politician from Vermont

Member of the Vermont House of Representatives from the Washington-4 district
- Incumbent
- Assumed office January 4, 2023

Personal details
- Born: New York
- Party: Democratic
- Education: Emerson College; Dublin City University

Conor Casey is an American politician from Vermont. He has been a Democratic member of the Vermont House of Representatives for the Washington-4 district since 2023. Casey is also a playwright. His satirical historical comedy Founding F%!#ers: The Story of Ethan Allen and Benedict Arnold had its premiere at the Greater Boston Stage Company in Stoneham, Massachusetts, in May 2025.
