= Richard J. Bailey =

American politician

Member of the Vermont House of Representatives from the Lamoille-2 district
- Incumbent
- Assumed office January 8, 2025

Personal details
- Born: Morristown, Vermont
- Party: Republican

Richard J. Bailey is an American politician. He serves as a Republican member for the Lamoille-2 district of the Vermont House of Representatives.

Born in Morristown, Bailey was a director at the Lamoille County Planning Commission. He competed for the same district in 2020 and 2022 Vermont House of Representative elections, but lost with 19.7% and 21.2%, respectively.
