= Kevin Christie (Vermont politician) =

American politician (born 1950)

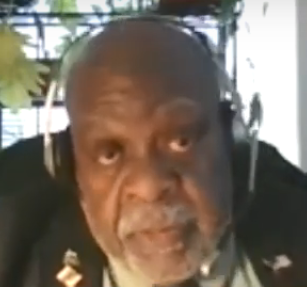
- Christie in 2021

Member of the Vermont House of Representatives from the Windsor-4-2 district
- Incumbent
- Assumed office 2011

Personal details
- Born: April 7, 1950 (age 76) Hartford, Connecticut, U.S.
- Party: Democratic
- Education: Eastern Connecticut State University
- Profession: Teacher

Kevin Christie (born April 7, 1950) is an American politician in the state of Vermont. He is a member of the Vermont House of Representatives, sitting as a Democrat from the Windsor-4-2 district, having been first elected in 2010.
