= Bram Kleppner =

American politician

Member of the Vermont House of Representatives from the Chittenden-13 district
- Incumbent
- Assumed office January 8, 2025
- Preceded by: Gabrielle Stebbins

Personal details
- Party: Democratic

Bram Kleppner is an American politician. He serves as a Democratic member for the Chittenden-13 district of the Vermont House of Representatives, representing the South End of Burlington in Chittenden County. He is a member of the House Committee on Energy and Digital Infrastructure and the Canvassing Committee.

He joined Cleantech Industry Resources as Senior Vice President of Marketing & Business Development in 2025. He previously worked as CEO of Danforth Pewter and as manager of international business development at Ben & Jerry’s. He has served on the Vermont Climate Council, the Vermont Tax Structure Commission, and the Governor’s Business Advisory on Healthcare Financing, as well as Board Chair at the non-profit Population Media Center.

Kleppner holds a BA from Middlebury College and an MBA from the University of Vermont.
