= Beth Quimby =

American politician

Member of the Vermont House of Representatives from the Caledonia-3 district
- Incumbent
- Assumed office March 12, 2024

Personal details
- Party: Republican

Beth Quimby is an American politician. She serves as a Republican member for the Caledonia-3 district of the Vermont House of Representatives.
