= Vermont House of Representatives =

Lower house of the Vermont General Assembly

Coordinates: 44°15′45″N 72°34′50″W

- Vermont General Assembly

Type
- Type: Lower house
- Term limits: None

History
- New session started: January 8, 2025

Leadership
- Speaker: Jill Krowinski (D) since January 6, 2021
- Majority Leader: Lori Houghton (D) since January 6, 2025
- Minority Leader: Patricia McCoy (R) since January 8, 2019

Structure
- Seats: 150
- Political groups: Majority (94): Democratic (87); Progressive (3); Independent (4); Minority (56): Republican (56)
- Length of term: 2 years
- Authority: Section 7, Legislative Department, Constitution of Vermont
- Salary: $636/week + per diem

Elections
- Voting system: First-past-the-post/Plurality-at-large
- Last election: November 5, 2024
- Next election: November 3, 2026
- Redistricting: Legislative control

Meeting place
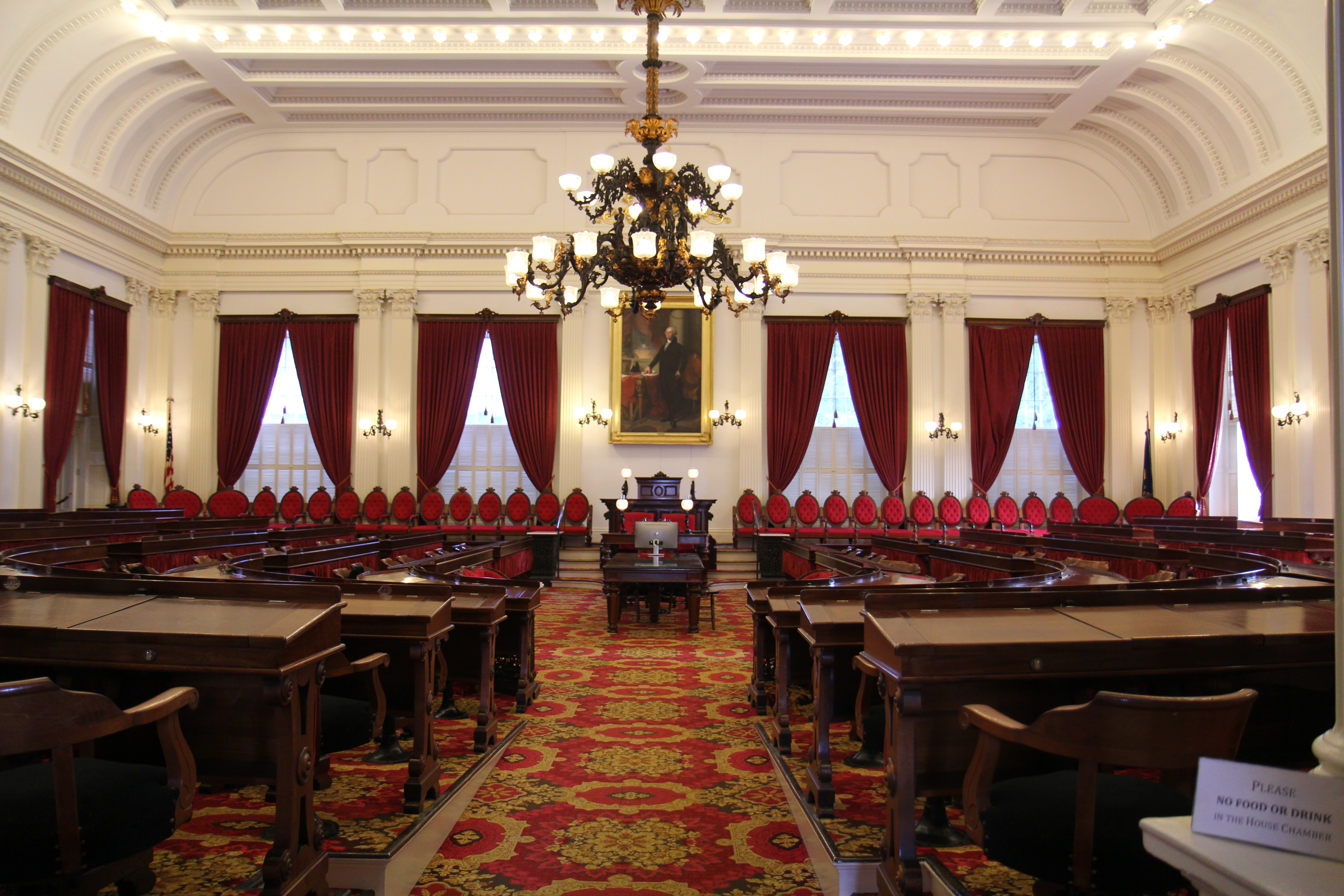
- State House Chamber, Vermont State House; Montpelier, Vermont, U.S.

The Vermont House of Representatives is the lower house of the Vermont General Assembly, the state legislature of Vermont. The House comprises 150 members, with each member representing around 4,100 citizens. Representatives are elected to two-year terms without term limits.

Vermont had a unicameral legislature until 1836. It added a senate by constitutional amendment. The House meets in Representatives Hall at the Vermont State House in Montpelier. It is the only U.S. state legislature whose debating chamber seating layout comes closer to that of the Westminster-style parliament found elsewhere, being similar to debating chambers in Australian state parliaments.

== One Town, One Vote ==
From 1777 to 1965, each city/town elected one representative to the Vermont House of Representatives, regardless of the population of the municipality. This changed with the U.S. Supreme Court's 1964 decree of "One Man, One Vote" in Reynolds v. Sims, which affected all state legislatures across the Union.

== Leadership ==
The Speaker of the House presides over the House of Representatives. The Speaker is elected by the full House by Australian Ballot. If there is only one candidate, the election is usually held by voice vote. In addition to presiding over the body, the Speaker controls committee assignments and the flow of legislation. Other House leaders, such as the majority and minority leaders and whips, are elected by their respective party caucuses relative to their party's strength in the chamber. There are three party caucuses in the Vermont House; the Democratic Caucus which is currently in the majority, and the Republican and Progressive Caucuses, each currently being in the minority. Independent members of the House may choose to caucus with a party or none at all.

Jill Krowinski (D-Burlington) is serving her second term as House Speaker.

=== Current leadership ===
Position	Name	Party	Residence	District
Speaker of the House	Jill Krowinski	Dem	Burlington	Chittenden-16
Majority Leader	Emily Long	Dem	Newfane	Windham-5
Minority Leader	Patricia McCoy	Rep	Poultney	Rutland-1

== Composition ==
Affiliation	Party (shading indicates majority caucus)					Total	Vacant
Affiliation	Democratic	Progressive	Independent	Republican	Libertarian	Total	Vacant
End 2012	94	5	3	47	0	150	0
Begin 2013	96	5	4	44	0	149	1
End 2014	96	5	4	45	0	150	0
2015–2016	85	6	6	53	0	150	0
2017-2018	83	7	7	53	0	150	0
2019-2020	95	7	5	43	0	150	0
2021–2022	92	7	5	46	0	150	0
Begin 2023	104	5	3	38	0	150	0
End 2024	105	4	3	37	1	150	0
Begin 2025	87	4	3	56	0	150	0
January 25, 2025 (Note: Troy Headrick changed his affiliation from Progressive to Independent.)	87	3	4	56	0	150	0
June 19, 2025 (Note: Mari Cordes resigned.)	86	3	4	56	0	149	1
September 29, 2025 (Note: Heather Surprenant resigned.)	85	3	4	56	0	148	2
October 22, 2025 (Note: Karen Lueders was appointed by Governor Phil Scott to succeed Cordes.)	86	3	4	56	0	149	1
December 2, 2025 (Note: Michael Hoyt was appointed by Governor Phil Scott to succeed Suprenant.)	87	3	4	56	0	150	0
January 16, 2026 (Note: Casey Toof resigned.)	87	3	4	55	0	149	1
February 20, 2026 (Note: Jack Brigham was appointed by Governor Phil Scott to succeed Toof.)	87	3	4	56	0	150	0
March 16, 2026 (Note: Robert Hooper resigned.)	86	3	4	56	0	149	1
March 27, 2026 (Note: Chris Taylor resigned.)	86	3	4	55	0	148	2
April 1, 2026 (Note: Kumulia Long was appointed by Governor Phil Scott to succeed Taylor.)	86	3	4	56	0	149	1
April 3, 2026 (Note: Francis McFaun resigned.)	86	3	4	55	0	148	2
April 9, 2026 (Note: David Soucy was appointed by Governor Phil Scott to succeed McFaun.)	86	3	4	56	0	149	1
April 16, 2026 (Note: Kevin Scully was appointed by Governor Phil Scott to succeed Hooper.)	87	3	4	56	0	150	0
Latest voting share	62.7%			37.3%	0%		

== Members ==
District	Representative	Party	Residence	First elected
Addison-1	Robin Scheu	Dem	Middlebury	2016
Addison-1	Amy Sheldon	Dem	Middlebury	2014
Addison-2	Peter Conlon	Dem	Cornwall	2016
Addison-3	Matt Birong	Dem	Vergennes	2018
Addison-3	Rob North	Rep	Vergennes	2024
Addison-4	Karen Lueders	Dem	Lincoln	2025↑
Addison-4	Herb Olson	Dem	Starksboro	2024
Addison-5	Jubilee McGill	Dem	Bridport	2022
Addison-Rutland	Jim Casey	Rep	Orwell	2024
Bennington-1	Jonathan Cooper	Dem	Pownal	2024
Bennington-2	Timothy Corcoran II	Dem	Bennington	2002
Bennington-2	Will Greer	Dem	North Bennington	2024
Bennington-3	David Durfee	Dem	Shaftsbury	2018
Bennington-4	Robert Hunter	Dem	Manchester	2024
Bennington-4	Kathleen James	Dem	Manchester	2018
Bennington-5	Mary A. Morrissey	Rep	Bennington	1996
Bennington-5	Michael Nigro	Dem	Bennington	2024 (2021–2023)
Bennington-Rutland	Sandra "Sandy" Pinsonault	Rep	Dorset	2024
Caledonia-1	Debra Powers	Rep	McIndoe Falls	2024
Caledonia-2	Michael Southworth	Rep	East Hardwick	2024
Caledonia-3	Martha Feltus	Rep	Lyndon	2024 (2013–2023)
Caledonia-3	Beth Quimby	Rep	Lyndon	2024↑
Caledonia-Essex	Scott Campbell	Dem	St. Johnsbury	2018
Caledonia-Essex	Deborah Cordz Dolgin	Rep	St. Johnsbury	2024
Caledonia-Washington	Greg Burtt	Rep	Danville	2024
Chittenden-1	Jana Brown	Dem	Richmond	2020
Chittenden-2	Angela Arsenault	Dem	Williston	2022
Chittenden-2	Erin Brady	Dem	Williston	2022
Chittenden-3	Edye Graning	Dem	Jericho	2022
Chittenden-3	Trevor Squirrell	Dem	Underhill	2016
Chittenden-4	Phil Pouech	Dem	Hinesburg	2022
Chittenden-5	Chea Waters Evans	Dem	Charlotte	2022
Chittenden-6	Kate Lalley	Dem	Shelburne	2022
Chittenden-7	Shawn Sweeney	Dem	Shelburne	2024
Chittenden-8	Bridget Burkhardt	Dem	South Burlington	2024
Chittenden-9	Emilie Krasnow	Dem	South Burlington	2022
Chittenden-10	Kate Nugent	Dem	South Burlington	2022
Chittenden-11	Brian Minier	Dem	South Burlington	2022
Chittenden-12	Martin LaLonde	Dem	South Burlington	2014
Chittenden-13	Tiff Bluemle	Dem	Burlington	2020
Chittenden-13	Bram Kleppner	Dem	Burlington	2024
Chittenden-14	Barbara Rachelson	Dem	Burlington	2012
Chittenden-14	Mary-Katherine Stone	Dem/Prog (Note: When two parties are listed, it means in the last election the representative received enough votes in two parties' primaries to be listed on the general election ballot as the nominee of both. The representative's primary party is listed first.)	Burlington	2022
Chittenden-15	Brian Cina	Prog/Dem	Burlington	2016
Chittenden-15	Troy Headrick	Ind	Burlington	2022
Chittenden-16	Jill Krowinski	Dem	Burlington	2012↑
Chittenden-16	Kate Logan	Prog/Dem	Burlington	2012
Chittenden-17	Abbey Duke	Dem	Burlington	2024↑
Chittenden-18	Carol Ode	Dem	Burlington	2016
Chittenden-18	Kevin Scully	Dem	Burlington	2026↑
Chittenden-19	Sarita Austin	Dem	Colchester	2018
Chittenden-19	Wendy Critchlow	Dem	Colchester	2024
Chittenden-20	Doug Bishop	Dem	Colchester	2024
Chittenden-20	Gayle Pezzo	Dem	Colchester	2024
Chittenden-21	Daisy Berbeco	Dem	Winooski	2022
Chittenden-21	Chloe Tomlinson	Prog/Dem	Winooski	2024
Chittenden-22	Karen Dolan	Dem	Essex Junction	2020
Chittenden-22	Lori Houghton	Dem	Essex Junction	2016
Chittenden-23	Leonora Dodge	Dem	Essex Town	2022
Chittenden-23	Rey Garofano	Dem	Essex Town	2021
Chittenden-24	Alyssa Black	Dem	Essex Town	2020
Chittenden-25	Brenda Steady	Rep	Milton	2024
Chittenden-Franklin	Kumulia Long	Rep	Milton	2026↑
Chittenden-Franklin	Anthony Micklus	Rep	Milton	2024
Essex-Caledonia	John Kascenska	Rep	East Burke	2024 (2022–2023)
Essex-Orleans	Larry Labor	Rep	Morgan	2022
Franklin-1	Ashley Bartley	Rep/Dem	Fairfax	2022
Franklin-1	Carolyn Branagan	Rep	Georgia	2022 (2003–2017)
Franklin-2	Eileen Dickinson	Rep	St. Albans Town	2008
Franklin-3	Joe Luneau	Rep	St. Albans City	2024
Franklin-4	Thomas Oliver	Rep/Dem	Sheldon	2022
Franklin-4	Matt Walker	Rep	Swanton	2022↑
Franklin-5	Lisa Hango	Rep	Berkshire	2019↑
Franklin-5	Wayne Laroche	Rep	Franklin	2022↑
Franklin-6	James Gregoire	Rep	Fairfield	2018
Franklin-7	Penny Demar	Rep	Enosburg	2022
Franklin-8	Jack Brigham	Rep	St. Albans Town	2026↑
Grand Isle-Chittenden	Leland Morgan	Rep	Milton	2024
Grand Isle-Chittenden	Michael Morgan	Rep	West Milton	2020
Lamoille-1	Jed Lipsky	Ind	Stowe	2022
Lamoille-2	Richard J. Bailey	Rep	Hyde Park	2024
Lamoille-2	Daniel Noyes	Dem	Wolcott	2016
Lamoille-3	Lucy Boyden	Dem	Cambridge	2022
Lamoille-Washington	Saudia LaMont	Dem	Morrisville	2022
Lamoille-Washington	David Yacovone	Dem	Morrisville	2024 (2017–2023)
Orange-1	Michael Tagliavia	Rep	Corinth	2024
Orange-2	Monique Priestley	Dem	Bradford	2022
Orange-3	Joshua Dobrovich	Rep	Williamstown	2024
Orange-Caledonia	Joseph Parsons	Rep	Newbury	2020
Orange-Washington-Addison	Jay Hooper	Dem	Randolph	2016
Orange-Washington-Addison	Larry Satcowitz	Dem	Brookfield	2020
Orleans-1	Richard M. Nelson	Rep	Derby	2024
Orleans-2	Woodman Page	Rep	Newport City	2018
Orleans-3	Ken Wells	Rep	Newport City	2024
Orleans-4	Leanne Harple	Dem	Glover	2024
Orleans-Lamoille	Mark Higley	Rep	Lowell	2008
Orleans-Lamoille	Michael Marcotte	Rep	Newport Town	2004
Rutland-1	Patricia McCoy	Rep	Poultney	2014
Rutland-2	David Bosch	Rep	Clarendon	2024
Rutland-2	Tom Burditt	Rep	West Rutland	2010
Rutland-3	Zachary Harvey	Rep	Castleton	2025↑
Rutland-4	Christopher Howland	Rep	Rutland Town	2024
Rutland-5	Eric Maguire	Rep	Rutland City	2022
Rutland-6	Mary Howard	Dem	Rutland City	2016
Rutland-7	Chris Keyser	Rep	Rutland City	2024
Rutland-8	Alicia Malay	Rep/Dem	Pittsford	2024
Rutland-9	Todd Nielsen	Rep	Brandon	2024
Rutland-10	Bill Canfield	Rep	Fair Haven	2004
Rutland-11	Valorie Taylor	Rep	Mendon	2026↑
Rutland-Bennington	Chris Pritchard	Rep	Pawlet	2024
Rutland-Windsor	Kevin C. Winter	Rep	Ludlow	2024
Washington-1	Anne Donahue	Ind	Northfield	2002
Washington-1	Kenneth Goslant	Rep	Berlin	2020
Washington-2	Dara Torre	Dem	Moretown	2022
Washington-2	Candice White	Dem	Waitsfield	2024
Washington-3	Michael Boutin	Rep	Barre City	2024
Washington-3	Edward Waszazak	Dem	Barre City	2024
Washington-4	Conor Casey	Dem	Montpelier	2022
Washington-4	Kate McCann	Dem	Montpelier	2022
Washington-5	Ela Chapin	Dem	East Montpelier	2022
Washington-6	Marc Mihaly	Dem	East Calais	2022
Washington-Chittenden	Tom Stevens	Dem	Waterbury	2008
Washington-Chittenden	Theresa Wood	Dem	Waterbury	2015↑
Washington-Orange	Gina Galfetti	Rep	Barre Town	2022
Washington-Orange	David Soucy	Rep	Barre Town	2026↑
Windham-1	Zon Eastes	Dem	Guilford	2024
Windham-2	Laura Sibilia	Ind	Dover	2014
Windham-3	Michelle Bos-Lun	Dem	Dummerston	2020
Windham-3	Leslie Goldman	Dem	Bellows Falls	2020
Windham-4	Mike Mrowicki	Dem	Putney	2008
Windham-5	Emily Long	Dem	Newfane	2014
Windham-6	Emily Carris-Duncan	Dem	Whitingham	2024
Windham-7	Emilie Kornheiser	Dem	Brattleboro	2018
Windham-8	Mollie Burke	Dem	Brattleboro	2008
Windham-9	Ian Goodnow	Dem	Brattleboro	2024
Windham-Windsor-Bennington	Christopher Morrow	Dem	Weston	2024
Windsor-1	John Bartholomew	Dem	Hartland	2010
Windsor-1	Elizabeth Burrows	Dem/Prog	West Windsor	2020
Windsor-2	VL Coffin	Rep	Cavendish	2024
Windsor-3	Alice Emmons	Dem	Springfield	1982
Windsor-3	Kristi Morris	Dem	Springfield	2019↑
Windsor-4	Michael Hoyt	Dem	West Hartford	2025↑
Windsor-5	Charles Kimbell	Dem	Woodstock	2024 (2017–2023)
Windsor-6	Kevin "Coach" Christie	Dem	Hartford	2010
Windsor-6	Esme Cole	Dem	Hartford	2022
Windsor-Addison	Kirk White	Dem	Bethel	2020
Windsor-Orange-1	John O'Brien	Dem	Tunbridge	2018
Windsor-Orange-2	Rebecca Holcombe	Dem	Norwich	2022
Windsor-Orange-2	Jim Masland	Dem	Thetford Center	1998
Windsor-Windham	Thomas F. Charlton	Rep	Chester	2024

- ↑: Member was originally appointed

== Past notable members ==
Nearly all of the Governors of the state and most of its U.S. representatives and U.S. senators were first members of this house. Other prominent members include:

- Consuelo N. Bailey, first woman elected lieutenant governor in the United States
- Edna Beard (1877–1928), first woman to be elected to the Vermont House, and the first elected to the Vermont Senate
- Francis William Billado, adjutant general of the Vermont National Guard
- Ray W. Collins, pitcher, Boston Red Sox (1909–1915)
- John Calvin Coolidge Sr., father of President Calvin Coolidge
- Donald E. Edwards, adjutant general of the Vermont National Guard
- Roger Enos, commander of the Vermont Militia during the American Revolution
- William H. Gilmore, adjutant general of the Vermont National Guard
- Lyman Enos Knapp, Governor of the District of Alaska (1889–1893)
- Bruce M. Lawlor, major general in the Army National Guard and one of the creators of the Department of Homeland Security
- Trenor W. Park, businessman and philanthropist
- Alden Partridge, founder of Norwich University
- Lewis Samuel Partridge, adjutant general of the Vermont National Guard
- Edward H. Ripley, Union Army officer in the American Civil War, businessman and horse breeder
- James Watson Webb II, businessman, philanthropist, and champion polo player
- William Seward Webb, businessman and philanthropist

== Operations ==
The house typically meets Tuesday through Friday during the session.

== See also ==
- Vermont State House
- Vermont General Assembly
- Speaker of the Vermont House of Representatives
- Vermont Senate
- Members of the Vermont House of Representatives, 2005–2006 session
- Members of the Vermont House of Representatives, 2007–2008 session
- Vermont Representative Districts, 2002–2012
- List of Vermont General Assemblies
