= 2022 Vermont House of Representatives election =

- November 8, 2022

All 150 seats in the Vermont House of Representatives 76 seats needed for a majority
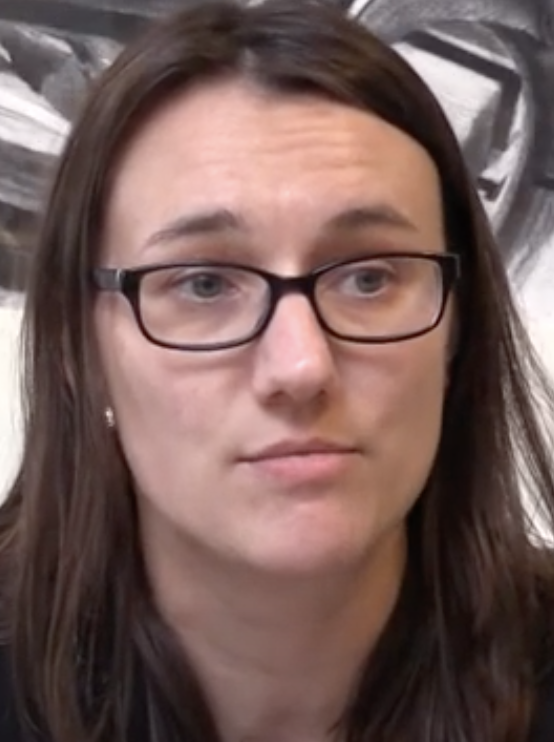

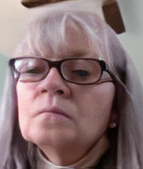

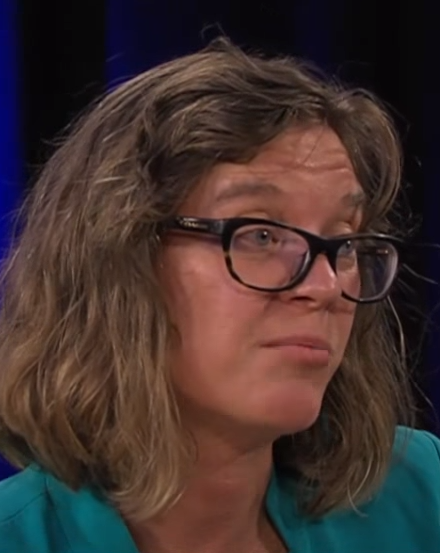

	Majority party	Minority party
Leader	Jill Krowinski	Patricia McCoy
Party	Democratic	Republican
Leader since	January 6, 2021	January 9, 2019
Leader's seat	Chittenden-16	Rutland-1
Seats before	92	46
Seats after	104	38
Seat change	▲12	▼8
Popular vote	229,296 (Note: Not counting Progressive and Republican candidates who were also nominated by the Democratic Party.)	115,456
Percentage	61.7%	31.1%
Swing	▲6.9%	▼3.4%
	Third party	Fourth party
Leader	Selene Colburn (retired)	none
Party	Progressive	Independent
Leader since	2021	N/A
Leader's seat	Chittenden-15	N/A
Seats before	7	5
Seats after	5	3
Seat change	▼2	▼2
Popular vote	9,740 (Note: Not counting Democratic candidates who were also nominated by the Progressive Party.)	12,586
Percentage	2.6%	3.4%
Swing	▼1.6	▼1.6
- Results: Republican hold Republican gain Democratic hold Democratic gain Progressive hold Progressive gain Independent hold Independent gain
Speaker before election
Jill Krowinski
Democratic
Elected Speaker
Jill Krowinski
Democratic

The 2022 Vermont House of Representatives election took place on November 8, 2022, as part of the biennial United States elections. The election coincided with elections for other offices including the U.S. Senate, U.S. House, Governor, and State Senate. Vermont voters elected all 150 state representatives from 109 districts, with each district electing between one and two representatives. State representatives served two-year terms. A primary election was held on August 9, 2022, and it determined which candidates appear on the November 8 general election ballot. All the members elected would serve in the Vermont General Assembly. This election was the first to use new districts adopted by the Vermont General Assembly to allocate for population changes across the state after the 2020 census.

Democrats won 104 seats in the Vermont House, attaining a veto-proof super-majority. This is the most seats Democrats had ever held in the chamber, and the most for either party since 1966.

== Results ==
District	Incumbent	Party	District	Elected representative	Party
Addison-1	Amy Sheldon	Dem	Addison-1	Amy Sheldon	Dem
Addison-1	Robin Scheu	Dem	Addison-1	Robin Scheu	Dem
Addison-2	Peter Conlon	Dem	Addison-2	Peter Conlon	Dem
Addison-3	Matt Birong	Dem	Addison-3	Matt Birong	Dem
Addison-3	Diane Lanpher	Dem	Addison-3	Diane Lanpher	Dem
Addison-4	Mari Cordes	Dem	Addison-4	Mari Cordes	Dem
Addison-4	Caleb Elder	Dem	Addison-4	Caleb Elder	Dem
Addison-5	Harvey Smith	Rep	Addison-5	Jubilee McGill	Dem
Addison-Rutland	Terry Norris	Ind	Addison-Rutland	Joseph Andriano	Dem
Bennington-1	Nelson Brownell	Dem	Bennington-1	Nelson Brownell	Dem
Bennington-2-1	Timothy Corcoran II	Dem	Bennington-2	Timothy Corcoran II	Dem
Bennington-2-1	Dane Whitman	Dem	Bennington-2	Dane Whitman	Dem
Bennington-3	David Durfee	Dem	Bennington-3	David Durfee	Dem
Bennington-4	Seth Bongartz	Dem	Bennington-4	Seth Bongartz	Dem
Bennington-4	Kathleen James	Dem	Bennington-4	Kathleen James	Dem
Bennington-2-2	Mary Morrissey	Rep	Bennington-5	Mary Morrissey	Rep
Bennington-2-2	Michael Nigro	Dem	Bennington-5	Jim Carroll	Dem
Bennington-Rutland	Linda Joy Sullivan	Dem/Rep	Bennington-Rutland	Mike Rice	Dem
Caledonia-1	Marcia Martel	Rep	Caledonia-1	Bobby Farlice-Rubio	Dem
Caledonia-2	Chip Troiano	Dem	Caledonia-2	Chip Troiano	Dem
Caledonia-4	Martha Feltus	Rep	Caledonia-3	Dennis LaBounty	Dem
Caledonia-4	John Kascenska (Note: Appointed in March 2022)	Rep	Caledonia-3	Charles Wilson	Rep
Caledonia-3	Scott Beck	Rep	Caledonia-Essex	Scott Beck	Rep
Caledonia-3	Scott Campbell	Dem	Caledonia-Essex	Scott Campbell	Dem
Caledonia-Washington	Henry Pearl	Dem	Caledonia-Washington	Henry Pearl	Dem
Chittenden-1	Jana Brown	Dem	Chittenden-1	Jana Brown	Dem
Chittenden-2	Erin Brady	Dem	Chittenden-2	Erin Brady	Dem
Chittenden-2	Jim McCullough	Dem	Chittenden-2	Angela Arsenault	Dem
Chittenden-3	Trevor Squirrell	Dem	Chittenden-3	Trevor Squirrell	Dem
Chittenden-3	George Till	Dem	Chittenden-3	Edye Graning	Dem
Chittenden-4-2	Bill Lippert	Dem	Chittenden-4	Phil Pouech	Dem
Chittenden-4-1	Mike Yantachka	Dem	Chittenden-5	Chea Waters Evans	Dem
Chittenden-5-1	Kate Webb	Dem	Chittenden-6	Kate Lalley	Dem
Chittenden-5-2	Jessica Brumsted	Dem	Chittenden-7	Jessica Brumsted	Dem
Chittenden-7-2	Ann Pugh	Dem	Chittenden-8	Noah Hyman	Dem
New Seat			Chittenden-9	Emilie Krasnow	Dem
Chittenden-7-4	Maida Townsend	Dem	Chittenden-10	Kate Nugent	Dem
Chittenden-7-3	John Killacky	Dem	Chittenden-11	Brian Minier	Dem
Chittenden-7-1	Martin LaLonde	Dem	Chittenden-12	Martin LaLonde	Dem
Chittenden-6-5	Tiff Bluemle	Dem	Chittenden-13	Tiff Bluemle	Dem
Chittenden-6-5	Gabrielle Stebbins	Dem	Chittenden-13	Gabrielle Stebbins	Dem
Chittenden-6-6	Barbara Rachelson	Dem/Prog	Chittenden-14	Barbara Rachelson	Dem/Prog
New Seat			Chittenden-14	Mary-Katherine Stone	Dem/Prog
Chittenden-6-4	Brian Cina	Prog/Dem	Chittenden-15	Brian Cina	Prog/Dem
Chittenden-6-4	Selene Colburn	Prog/Dem	Chittenden-15	Troy Headrick	Prog/Dem
Chittenden-6-3	Jill Krowinski	Dem	Chittenden-16	Jill Krowinski	Dem
Chittenden-6-3	Curt McCormack	Dem	Chittenden-16	Kate Logan	Prog/Dem
Chittenden-6-2	Emma Mulvaney-Stanak	Prog/Dem	Chittenden-17	Emma Mulvaney-Stanak	Prog/Dem
Chittenden-6-1	Carole Ode	Dem	Chittenden-18	Carol Ode	Dem
Chittenden-6-1	Robert Hooper	Dem	Chittenden-18	Robert Hooper	Dem
Chittenden-9-2	Sarita Austin	Dem	Chittenden-19	Sarita Austin	Dem
Chittenden-9-2	Patrick Brennan	Rep	Chittenden-19	Patrick Brennan	Rep
Chittenden-9-1	Curt Taylor	Dem	Chittenden-20	Curt Taylor	Dem
Chittenden-9-1	Seth Chase	Dem	Chittenden-20	Seth Chase	Dem
Chittenden-6-7	Hal Colston	Dem	Chittenden-21	Daisy Berbeco	Dem
Chittenden-6-7	Taylor Small	Prog/Dem	Chittenden-21	Taylor Small	Prog/Dem
Chittenden-8-2	Lori Houghton	Dem	Chittenden-22	Lori Houghton	Dem
Chittenden-8-2	Karen Dolan	Dem	Chittenden-22	Karen Dolan	Dem
Chittenden-8-1	Tanya Vyhovsky	Prog/Dem	Chittenden-23	Leonora Dodge	Dem
Chittenden-8-1	Rey Garofano (Note: Appointed in January 2022)	Dem	Chittenden-23	Rey Garofano	Dem
Chittenden-8-3	Alyssa Black	Dem	Chittenden-24	Alyssa Black	Dem
New Seat			Chittenden-25	Julia Andrews	Dem
Chittenden-10	Chris Mattos	Rep	Chittenden-Franklin	Chris Mattos	Rep
Chittenden-10	John Palasik	Rep	Chittenden-Franklin	Chris Taylor	Rep
Essex-Caledonia	Terri Lynn Williams	Rep	Essex-Caledonia	Terri Lynn Williams	Rep
Essex-Caledonia-Orleans	Paul Lefebvre	Ind	Essex-Orleans	Larry Labor	Rep
Franklin-1	Carl Rosenquist	Rep	Franklin-1	Ashley Bartley	Rep
Franklin-2	Barbara Murphy	Ind	Franklin-1	Carolyn Whitney Branagan	Rep
Franklin-3-2	Eileen Dickinson	Rep/Dem	Franklin-2	Eileen Dickinson	Rep/Dem
Franklin-3-1	Mike McCarthy	Dem	Franklin-3	Mike McCarthy	Dem
Franklin-4	Matthew Walker (Note: Appointed in February 2022)	Rep	Franklin-4	Matthew Walker	Rep/Dem
Franklin-4	Robert Norris	Rep	Franklin-4	Thomas Oliver	Rep/Dem
Franklin-5	Lisa Hango	Rep	Franklin-5	Lisa Hango	Rep/Dem
Franklin-5	Wayne Laroche	Rep	Franklin-5	Wayne Laroche	Rep/Dem
Franklin-6	James Gregoire	Rep/Dem	Franklin-6	James Gregoire	Rep
Franklin-7	Felisha Leffler	Rep	Franklin-7	Allen Demar	Rep
Franklin-3-1	Casey Toof	Rep	Franklin-8	Casey Toof	Rep
Grand Isle-Chittenden	Michael Morgan	Rep	Grand Isle-Chittenden	Michael Morgan	Rep
Grand Isle-Chittenden	Leland Morgan	Rep	Grand Isle-Chittenden	Josie Leavitt	Dem
Lamoille-1	Heidi Scheuermann	Rep	Lamoille-1	Jed Lipsky	Ind
Lamoille-2	Kate Donnally	Dem	Lamoille-2	Kate Donnally	Dem
Lamoille-2	Daniel Noyes	Dem	Lamoille-2	Daniel Noyes	Dem
Lamoille-3	Lucy Rogers	Dem	Lamoille-3	Lucy Boyden	Dem
Lamoille-Washington	David Yacovone	Dem	Lamoille-Washington	Saudia LaMont	Dem
Lamoille-Washington	Avram Patt	Dem	Lamoille-Washington	Avram Patt	Dem
Orange-1	Samantha Lefebvre	Rep	Orange-1	Carl Demrow	Dem
Orange-2	Sarah Copeland Hanzas	Dem	Orange-2	Monique Priestley	Dem
Orange-1	Rodney Graham	Rep	Orange-3	Rodney Graham	Rep
Orange-Caledonia	Joe Parsons	Rep	Orange-Caledonia	Joe Parsons	Rep
Orange-Washington-Addison	Jay Hooper	Dem	Orange-Washington-Addison	Jay Hooper	Dem
Orange-Washington-Addison	Larry Satcowitz	Dem	Orange-Washington-Addison	Larry Satcowitz	Dem
Orleans-1	Brian Smith	Rep/Dem	Orleans-1	Brian Smith	Rep
Orleans-1	Lynn Batchelor	Rep	Orleans-1	Brian Smith	Rep
Orleans-2	Woody Page	Rep/Dem	Orleans-2	Woody Page	Rep
New Seat			Orleans-3	Dave Templeman	Dem
Orleans-Caledonia	Katherine Sims	Dem	Orleans-4	Katherine Sims	Dem
Orleans-Caledonia	Vicki Strong	Rep	Orleans-4	Katherine Sims	Dem
Orleans-Lamoille	Mark Higley	Rep/Dem	Orleans-Lamoille	Mark Higley	Rep/Dem
Orleans-2	Michael Marcotte	Rep/Dem	Orleans-Lamoille	Michael Marcotte	Rep/Dem
Rutland-1	Patricia McCoy	Rep	Rutland-1	Patricia McCoy	Rep
Rutland-2	Tom Burditt	Rep	Rutland-2	Tom Burditt	Rep
Rutland-2	Arthur Peterson	Rep	Rutland-2	Arthur Peterson	Rep
Rutland-3	Robert Helm	Rep	Rutland-3	Jarrod Sammis	Rep
Rutland-4	Thomas Terenzini	Rep	Rutland-4	Paul Clifford	Rep
Rutland-5-1	Peter Fagan	Rep	Rutland-4	Paul Clifford	Rep
Rutland-5-2	Larry Cupoli	Rep	Rutland-5	Eric Maguire	Rep
Rutland-5-3	Mary Howard	Dem	Rutland-6	Mary Howard	Dem
Rutland-5-4	William Notte	Dem	Rutland-7	William Notte	Dem
Rutland-6	Butch Shaw	Rep/Dem	Rutland-8	Butch Shaw	Rep/Dem
Rutland-6	Stephanie Jerome	Dem	Rutland-9	Stephanie Jerome	Dem
Rutland-3	Bill Canfield	Rep	Rutland-10	Bill Canfield	Rep
Rutland-Windsor-1	Jim Harrison	Rep/Dem	Rutland-11	Jim Harrison	Rep/Dem
Rutland-Bennington	Sally Achey	Rep	Rutland-Bennington	Robin Chestnut-Tangerman	Dem
Rutland-Windsor-2	Logan Nicoll	Dem	Rutland-Windsor	Logan Nicoll	Dem
Washington-1	Anne Donahue	Rep	Washington-1	Anne Donahue	Rep
Washington-1	Kenneth Goslant	Rep	Washington-1	Kenneth Goslant	Rep
Washington-7	Kari Dolan	Dem	Washington-2	Kari Dolan	Dem
Washington-7	Maxine Grad	Dem	Washington-2	Dara Torre	Dem
Washington-3	Peter Anthony	Dem	Washington-3	Peter Anthony	Dem
Washington-3	Tommy Walz	Dem	Washington-3	Jonathan Williams	Dem
Washington-4	Mary Hooper	Dem	Washington-4	Kate McCann	Dem
Washington-4	Warren Kitzmiller	Dem	Washington-4	Conor Casey	Dem
Washington-5	Kimberly Jessup	Dem	Washington-5	Ela Chapin	Dem
Washington-6	Janet Ancel	Dem	Washington-6	Marc Mihaly	Dem
Washington-Chittenden	Theresa Wood	Dem	Washington-Chittenden	Theresa Wood	Dem
Washington-Chittenden	Tom Stevens	Dem	Washington-Chittenden	Tom Stevens	Dem
Washington-2	Topper McFaun	Rep	Washington-Orange	Topper McFaun	Rep
Washington-2	Rob LaClair	Rep	Washington-Orange	Gina Galfetti	Rep
Windham-1	Sara Coffey	Dem	Windham-1	Sara Coffey	Dem
Windham-Bennington	Laura Sibilia	Ind	Windham-2	Laura Sibilia	Ind
Windham-3	Leslie Goldman	Dem	Windham-3	Leslie Goldman	Dem
Windham-3	Carolyn Partridge	Dem	Windham-3	Leslie Goldman	Dem
Windham-4	Michelle Bos-Lun	Dem	Windham-3	Michelle Bos-Lun	Dem
Windham-4	Mike Mrowicki	Dem	Windham-4	Mike Mrowicki	Dem
Windham-5	Emily Long	Dem	Windham-5	Emily Long	Dem
Windham-6	John Gannon	Dem	Windham-6	Tristan Roberts	Dem
Windham-2-1	Emilie Kornheiser	Dem/Prog	Windham-7	Emilie Kornheiser	Dem
Windham-2-2	Mollie Burke	Prog/Dem	Windham-8	Mollie Burke	Dem
Windham-2-3	Tristan Toleno	Dem	Windham-9	Tristan Toleno	Dem
Windham-Bennington-Windsor	Kelly Pajala	Ind	Windham-Windsor-Bennigton	Kelly Pajala	Ind
Windsor-1	John Bartholomew	Dem	Windsor-1	John Bartholomew	Dem
Windsor-1	Elizabeth Burrows	Dem/Prog	Windsor-1	Elizabeth Burrows	Dem
Windsor-2	John Arrison	Dem	Windsor-2	John Arrison	Dem
Windsor-3-2	Alice Emmons	Dem	Windsor-3	Alice Emmons	Dem
Windsor-3-2	Kristi Morris	Dem	Windsor-3	Kristi Morris	Dem
Windsor-4-1	Heather Surprenant	Prog/Dem	Windsor-4	Heather Surprenant	Dem
Windsor-5	Charlie Kimbell	Dem	Windsor-5	Tesha Buss	Dem
Windsor-4-2	Kevin "Coach" Christie	Dem	Windsor-6	Kevin "Coach" Christie	Dem
Windsor-4-2	Rebecca White	Dem	Windsor-6	Esme Cole	Dem
Windsor-Rutland	Kirk White	Dem/Prog	Windsor-Addison	Kirk White	Dem
Windsor-Orange-1	John O'Brien	Dem	Windsor-Orange-1	John O'Brien	Dem
Windsor-Orange-2	Tim Briglin	Dem	Windsor-Orange-2	Rebecca Holcombe	Dem
Windsor-Orange-2	Jim Masland	Dem	Windsor-Orange-2	Jim Masland	Dem
Windsor-3-1	Thomas Bock	Dem	Windsor-Windham	Heather Chase	Dem

== Retiring incumbents ==
43 incumbent representatives (25 Democrats, 13 Republicans, 2 Progressives and 3 independents) had announced they would not seek reelection.

- Note: districts shown are pre-redistricting
1. Addison-5: Harvey Smith (R)
2. Addison-Rutland: Terry Norris (I)
3. Bennington-Rutland: Linda Joy Sullivan (D)
4. Caledonia-1: Marcia Martel (R)
5. Caledonia-4: Marty Feltus (R)
6. Chittenden-2: Jim McCullough (D)
7. Chittenden-3: George Till (D)
8. Chittenden-4-2: Bill Lippert (D)
9. Chittenden-5-1: Kate Webb (D)
10. Chittenden-6-3: Curt McCormack (D)
11. Chittenden-6-4: Selene Colburn (P/D)
12. Chittenden-6-7: Hal Colston (D)
13. Chittenden-7-2: Ann Pugh (D)
14. Chittenden-7-3: John Killacky (D)
15. Chittenden-7-4: Maida Townsend (D)
16. Chittenden-8-1: Tanya Vyhovsky (P/D) (ran for state senate)
17. Chittenden-10: John Palasik (R)
18. Essex-Caledonia-Orleans: Paul Lefebvre (I)
19. Franklin-1: Carl Rosenquist (R)
20. Franklin-2: Barbara Murphy (I)
21. Franklin-5: Robert Norris (R) (ran for state senate)
22. Franklin-7: Felisha Leffler (R)
23. Grand Isle-Chittenden: Leland Morgan (R) (ran for state senate)
24. Lamoille-1: Heidi Scheuermann (R)
25. Lamoille-3: Lucy Rogers (D)
26. Lamoille-Washington: David Yacovone (D)
27. Orange-2: Sarah Copeland Hanzas (D) (ran for Secretary of State)
28. Rutland-3: Bob Helm (R)
29. Rutland-5-1: Peter Fagan (R)
30. Rutland-5-2: Larry Cupoli (R)
31. Washington-2: Rob LaClair (R)
32. Washington-3: Tommy Walz (D)
33. Washington-4: Mary Hooper (D)
34. Washington-4: Warren Kitzmiller (D)
35. Washington-5: Kimberly Jessup (D)
36. Washington-6: Janet Ancel (D)
37. Washington-7: Maxine Grad (D)
38. Windham-3: Carolyn Partridge (D)
39. Windham-6: John Gannon (D)
40. Windsor-3-1: Thomas Bock (D)
41. Windsor-4: Becca White (D) (ran for state senate)
42. Windsor-5: Charlie Kimbell (D) (ran for Lieutenant Governor)
43. Windsor-Orange-2: Tim Briglin (D)

== Defeated incumbents ==
=== In the primary ===
Two incumbent representatives (1 Republican and 1 Democrat) sought reelection but were defeated in the August 9 primary.

1. Chittenden-5: Mike Yantachka (D)
2. Essex-Caledonia: John Kascenska (R)

=== In the general election ===
Four incumbent representatives (3 Republicans and 1 Democrat) sought reelection but were defeated in the November 3 general election.

1. Bennington-5: Michael Nigro (D)
2. Orange-1: Samantha Lefebvre (R)
3. Orleans-4: Vicki Strong (R)
4. Rutland-Bennington: Sally Achey (R)

== Predictions ==
Source	Ranking	As of
Sabato's Crystal Ball	Safe D	May 19, 2022

== Detailed results ==
Sources for election results:

=== Addison-1 ===
- Elects two representatives.

Democratic primary

Addison-1 Democratic primary, 2022
Party	Candidate	Votes	%
Democratic	Amy Sheldon (incumbent)	1,196	51.1
Democratic	Robin Scheu (incumbent)	1,141	48.7
Democratic	Write-ins	5	0.0
Total votes		2,342	100.0

Republican primary

Addison-1 Republican primary, 2022
Party	Candidate	Votes	%
Republican	Peter Caldwell (write-in)	32	36.4
Republican	Other write-ins	56	63.6
Total votes		88	100.0

General election

Addison-1 general election, 2022
Party	Candidate	Votes	%
Democratic	Amy Sheldon (incumbent)	2,329	44.0
Democratic	Robin Scheu (incumbent)	2,235	42.3
Republican	Peter Caldwell	705	13.3
Write-in	Write-ins	20	0.4
Total votes		5,289	100.0
Democratic hold			
Democratic hold			

=== Addison-2 ===
- Elects one representative.

Democratic primary

Addison-2 Democratic primary, 2022
Party	Candidate	Votes	%
Democratic	Peter Conlon (incumbent)	457	53.8
Democratic	Wendy Harlin	393	46.2
Total votes		850	100.0

- No other candidates filed to run in the district.

General election

Addison-2 general election, 2022
Party	Candidate	Votes	%
Democratic	Peter Conlon (incumbent)	1,617	93.3
Write-in	Write-ins	116	6.7
Total votes		1,733	100.0
Democratic hold			

=== Addison-3 ===
- Elects two representatives.

Democratic primary

Addison-3 Democratic primary, 2022
Party	Candidate	Votes	%
Democratic	Diane Lanpher (incumbent)	1,215	50.0
Democratic	Matt Birong (incumbent)	1,185	48.8
Democratic	Write-ins	29	1.2
Total votes		2,429	100.0

Republican primary

Addison-3 Republican primary, 2022
Party	Candidate	Votes	%
Republican	Rob North	489	60.7
Republican	James McClay	305	37.8
Republican	Write-ins	12	1.5
Total votes		806	100.0

General election

Addison-3 general election, 2022
Party	Candidate	Votes	%
Democratic	Diane Lanpher (incumbent)	2,540	31.1
Democratic	Matt Birong (incumbent)	2,520	30.9
Republican	Rob North	1,790	21.9
Republican	James McClay	1,298	15.9
Write-in	Write-ins	8	0.1
Total votes		8,156	100.0
Democratic hold			
Democratic hold			

=== Addison-4 ===
- Elects two representatives.

Democratic primary

Addison-4 Democratic primary, 2022
Party	Candidate	Votes	%
Democratic	Caleb Elder (incumbent)	1,545	49.6
Democratic	Mari Cordes (incumbent)	1,534	49.3
Democratic	Write-ins	33	1.1
Total votes		3,112	100.0

Republican primary

Addison-4 Republican primary, 2022
Party	Candidate	Votes	%
Republican	Valerie Mullin	366	50.1
Republican	Lynn Dike	351	48.0
Republican	Write-ins	14	1.9
Total votes		731	100.0

General election

Addison-4 general election, 2020
Party	Candidate	Votes	%
Democratic	Caleb Elder (incumbent)	2,769	33.0
Democratic	Mari Cordes (incumbent)	2,675	31.9
Republican	Lynn Dike	1,509	18.0
Republican	Valerie Mullin	1,429	17.0
Write-in	Write-ins	10	0.1
Total votes		8,392	100.0
Democratic hold			
Democratic hold			

=== Addison-5 ===
- Elects one representative.

Republican primary

Addison-5 Republican primary, 2022
Party	Candidate	Votes	%
Republican	Jon Christiano	163	54.7
Republican	Zachary Kent	134	134
Republican	Write-ins	1	0.3
Total votes		298	100.0

Democratic primary

Addison-5 Democratic primary, 2022
Party	Candidate	Votes	%
Democratic	Jubilee McGill	676	99.1
Democratic	Write-ins	6	0.9
Total votes		682	100.0

General election

Addison-5 general election, 2020
Party	Candidate	Votes	%
Democratic	Jubilee McGill	1,355	63.1
Republican	Jon Christiano	788	36.7
Write-in	Write-ins	3	0.1
Total votes		2,146	100.0
Democratic gain from Republican			

=== Addison-Rutland ===
- Elects one representative.

Democratic primary

Addison-Rutland Democratic primary, 2022
Party	Candidate	Votes	%
Democratic	Joseph Andriano	513	99.6
Democratic	Write-ins	2	0.4
Total votes		515	100.0

- No other candidates filed to run in the district.

General election

Addison-Rutland general election, 2022
Party	Candidate	Votes	%
Democratic	Joseph Andriano	1,473	94.0
Write-in	Write-ins	94	6.0
Total votes		1,567	100.0
Democratic gain from Independent			

=== Bennington-1 ===
- Elects one representative.

Democratic primary

Bennington-1 Democratic primary, 2022
Party	Candidate	Votes	%
Democratic	Nelson Brownell (incumbent)	379	95.5
Democratic	Write-ins	18	4.5
Total votes		397	100.0

Republican primary

Bennington-1 Republican primary, 2022
Party	Candidate	Votes	%
Republican	Bruce Busa (write-in)	68	100.0
Total votes		68	100.0

General election

Bennington-1 general election, 2022
Party	Candidate	Votes	%
Democratic	Nelson Brownell (incumbent)	974	50.4
Republican	Bruce Busa	948	49.0
Write-in	Write-ins	12	0.6
Total votes		1,934	100.0
Democratic hold			

=== Bennington-2 ===
- Elects two representatives.

Democratic primary

Bennington-2 Democratic primary, 2022
Party	Candidate	Votes	%
Democratic	Dane Whitman (incumbent)	728	50.9
Democratic	Timothy Corcoran II (incumbent)	701	49.1
Total votes		1,429	100.0

- No other candidates filed to run in this district.

General election

Bennington-2 general election, 2022
Party	Candidate	Votes	%
Democratic	Timothy Corcoran II (incumbent)	2,045	52.7
Democratic	Dane Whitman (incumbent)	1,772	45.6
Write-in	Write-ins	65	1.7
Total votes		3,882	100.0
Democratic hold			
Democratic hold			

=== Bennington-3 ===
- Elects one representative.

Democratic primary

Bennington-3 Democratic primary, 2022
Party	Candidate	Votes	%
Democratic	David Durfee (incumbent)	574	99.5
Democratic	Write-ins	3	0.5
Total votes		577	100.0

Republican primary

Bennington-3 Republican primary, 2022
Party	Candidate	Votes	%
Republican	Victor Harwood Jr.	186	97.4
Republican	Write-ins	5	2.6
Total votes		191	100.0

General election

Bennington-3 general election, 2022
Party	Candidate	Votes	%
Democratic	David Durfee (incumbent)	1,179	61.6
Republican	Victor Harwood Jr.	731	38.2
Write-in	Write-ins	5	0.3
Total votes		1,915	100.0
Democratic hold			

=== Bennington-4 ===
- Elects two representatives.

Democratic primary

Bennington-4 Democratic primary, 2022
Party	Candidate	Votes	%
Democratic	Kathleen James (incumbent)	1,030	51.4
Democratic	Seth Bongartz (incumbent)	957	47.8
Democratic	Write-ins	16	0.8
Total votes		2,003	100.0

Republican primary

Bennington-4 Republican primary, 2022
Party	Candidate	Votes	%
Republican	Joe Gervais (write-in)		
Total votes			100.0

General election

Bennington-4 general election, 2022
Party	Candidate	Votes	%
Democratic	Kathleen James (incumbent)	2,517	39.1
Democratic	Seth Bongartz (incumbent)	2,503	38.9
Republican	Joe Gervais	1,369	21.3
Write-in	Write-ins	46	0.7
Total votes		6,435	100.0
Democratic hold			
Democratic hold			

=== Bennington-5 ===
- Elects two representatives.

Democratic primary

Bennington-5 Democratic primary, 2022
Party	Candidate	Votes	%
Democratic	Jim Carroll	708	51.8
Democratic	Michael Nigro (incumbent)	656	48.0
Democratic	Write-ins	4	0.3
Total votes			100.0

Republican primary

Bennington-5 Republican primary, 2022
Party	Candidate	Votes	%
Republican	Mary A. Morrissey (incumbent)	322	97.3
Republican	Write-ins	9	2.7
Total votes			100.0

General election

Bennington-5 general election, 2022
Party	Candidate	Votes	%
Republican	Mary A. Morrissey (incumbent)	1,869	40.3
Democratic	Jim Carroll	1,427	30.8
Democratic	Michael Nigro (incumbent)	1,290	27.8
Write-in	Write-ins	49	1.1
Total votes		4,635	100.0
Republican hold			
Democratic hold			

=== Bennington-Rutland ===
- Elects one representative.

Democratic primary

Bennington-Rutland Democratic primary, 2022
Party	Candidate	Votes	%
Democratic	Mike Rice	556	94.6
Democratic	Write-ins	32	5.4
Total votes		588	100.0

Republican primary

Bennington-Rutland Republican primary, 2022
Party	Candidate	Votes	%
Republican	Michael Gaiotti	235	100.0
Total votes		235	100.0

General election

Bennington-Rutland general election, 2022
Party	Candidate	Votes	%
Democratic	Mike Rice	1,169	52.9
Republican	Michael Gaiotti	1,040	47.1
Write-in	Write-ins	1	0.0
Total votes		2,210	100.0
Democratic hold			

=== Caledonia-1 ===
- Elects one representative.

Democratic primary

Caledonia-1 Democratic primary, 2022
Party	Candidate	Votes	%
Democratic	Bobby Farlice-Rubio	455	99.6
Democratic	Write-ins	2	0.4
Total votes		457	100.0

- No other candidates filed to run in the district.

General election

Caledonia-1 general election, 2022
Party	Candidate	Votes	%
Democratic	Bobby Farlice-Rubio	1,478	93.0
Write-in	Write-ins	112	7.0
Total votes		1,590	100.0
Democratic gain from Republican			

=== Caledonia-2 ===
- Elects one representative.

Democratic primary

Caledonia-2 Democratic primary, 2022
Party	Candidate	Votes	%
Democratic	Chip Troiano (incumbent)	450	99.6
Democratic	Write-ins	2	0.4
Total votes		452	100.0

- No other candidates filed to run in the district.

General election

Caledonia-2 general election, 2022
Party	Candidate	Votes	%
Democratic	Chip Troiano (incumbent)	1,304	95.5
Write-in	Write-ins	61	4.5
Total votes		1,365	100.0
Democratic hold			

=== Caledonia-3 ===
- Elects two representatives.

Democratic primary

Caledonia-3 Democratic primary, 2022
Party	Candidate	Votes	%
Democratic	Eileen Boland	388	49.9
Democratic	Dennis Labounty	382	49.1
Democratic	Write-ins	8	1.0
Total votes		778	100.0

Republican primary

Caledonia-3 Republican primary, 2022
Party	Candidate	Votes	%
Republican	Charles Wilson	459	92.0
Republican	Write-ins	40	8.0
Total votes		499	100.0

General election

Caledonia-3 general election, 2022
Party	Candidate	Votes	%
Republican	Charles Wilson	1,683	35.7
Democratic	Dennis Labounty	1,674	35.5
Democratic	Eileen Boland	1,324	28.1
Write-in	Write-ins	36	0.8
Total votes		4,717	100.0
Republican hold			
Democratic hold			

=== Caledonia-Essex ===
- Elects two representatives.

Democratic primary

Caledonia-Essex Democratic primary, 2022
Party	Candidate	Votes	%
Democratic	Scott Campbell (incumbent)	773	82.8
Democratic	Brendan Hadash (write-in)	84	9.0
Democratic	Other write-ins	77	8.2
Total votes		934	100.0

Republican primary

Caledonia-Essex Republican primary, 2022
Party	Candidate	Votes	%
Republican	Scott Beck (incumbent)	349	53.3
Republican	Frank Empsall	297	45.3
Republican	Write-ins	9	1.4
Total votes		655	100.0

General election

Caledonia-Essex general election, 2022
Party	Candidate	Votes	%
Republican	Scott Beck (incumbent)	1,795	30.0
Democratic	Scott Campbell (incumbent)	1,783	29.8
Republican	Frank Empsall	1,239	20.7
Democratic	Brendan Hadash	1,157	19.3
Write-in	Write-ins	16	0.3
Total votes		5,991	100.0
Democratic hold			
Republican hold			

=== Caledonia-Washington ===
- Elects one representative.

Democratic primary

Caledonia-Washington Democratic primary, 2022
Party	Candidate	Votes	%
Democratic	Henry Pearl (incumbent)	821	98.8
Democratic	Write-ins	10	1.2
Total votes		831	100.0

General election

Caledonia-Washington general election, 2022
Party	Candidate	Votes	%
Democratic	Henry Pearl (incumbent)	1,574	67.1
Independent	Alison Despathy	750	32.0
Write-in	Write-ins	21	0.9
Total votes		2,345	100.0
Democratic hold			

=== Chittenden-1 ===
- Elects one representative.

Democratic primary

Chittenden-1 Democratic primary, 2022
Party	Candidate	Votes	%
Democratic	Jana Brown (incumbent)	1,000	99.8
Democratic	Write-ins	2	0.2
Total votes		1,002	100.0

- No other candidates filed to run in the district.

General election

Chittenden-1 general election, 2022
Party	Candidate	Votes	%
Democratic	Jana Brown (incumbent)	1,996	98.8
Write-in	Write-ins	24	1.2
Total votes		2,020	100.0
Democratic hold			

=== Chittenden-2 ===
- Elects two representatives.

Democratic primary

Chittenden-2 Democratic primary, 2022
Party	Candidate	Votes	%
Democratic	Erin Brady (incumbent)	1,760	54.2
Democratic	Angela Arsenault	1,467	45.2
Democratic	Write-ins	18	1.6
Total votes		3,245	100.0

Republican primary

Chittenden-2 Republican primary, 2022
Party	Candidate	Votes	%
Republican	Bruce Roy (write-in)	78	41.3
Republican	Tony O'Rourke (write-in)	71	37.6
Republican	Other write-ins	40	21.2
Total votes		189	100.0

General election

Chittenden-2 general election, 2022
Party	Candidate	Votes	%
Democratic	Erin Brady (incumbent)	3,335	34.9
Democratic	Angela Arsenault	2,972	31.1
Republican	Bruce Roy	1,663	17.4
Republican	Tony O'Rourke	1,577	16.5
Write-in	Write-ins	16	0.2
Total votes		9,563	100.0
Democratic hold			
Democratic hold			

=== Chittenden-3 ===
- Elects two representatives.

Democratic primary

Chittenden-3 Democratic primary, 2022
Party	Candidate	Votes	%
Democratic	Trevor Squirrell (incumbent)	1,626	52.0
Democratic	Edye Graning	1,482	47.4
Democratic	Write-ins	18	0.6
Total votes		3,126	100.0

- No other candidates filed to run in the district.

General election

Chittenden-3 general election, 2022
Party	Candidate	Votes	%
Democratic	Trevor Squirrell (incumbent)	3,492	49.9
Democratic	Edye Graning	3,394	48.5
Write-in	Write-ins	108	1.5
Total votes		6,994	100.0
Democratic hold			
Democratic hold			

=== Chittenden-4 ===
- Elects one representative.

Democratic primary

Chittenden-4 Democratic primary, 2022
Party	Candidate	Votes	%
Democratic	Phil Pouech	563	53.3
Democratic	Christina Deeley	493	46.7
Total votes		1,056	100.0

Republican primary

Chittenden-4 Republican primary, 2022
Party	Candidate	Votes	%
Republican	Sarah Toscano	117	96.7
Republican	Write-ins	4	3.3
Total votes		121	100.0

General election

Chittenden-4 general election, 2022
Party	Candidate	Votes	%
Democratic	Phil Pouech	1,683	71.7
Republican	Sarah Toscano	643	27.4
Write-in	Write-ins	20	0.9
Total votes		2,346	100.0
Democratic hold			

=== Chittenden-5 ===
- Elects one representative.

Democratic primary

Chittenden-5 Democratic primary, 2022
Party	Candidate	Votes	%
Democratic	Chea Waters Evans	701	52.3
Democratic	Mike Yantachka (incumbent)	640	47.7
Total votes		1,341	100.0

- No other candidates filed to run in the district.

General election

Chittenden-4 general election, 2022
Party	Candidate	Votes	%
Democratic	Chea Waters Evans	1,787	93.8
Write-in	Write-ins	119	6.2
Total votes		1,906	100.0
Democratic hold			

=== Chittenden-6 ===
- Elects one representative.

Democratic primary

Chittenden-6 Democratic primary, 2022
Party	Candidate	Votes	%
Democratic	Kate Lalley	1,135	99.2
Democratic	Write-ins	9	0.8
Total votes		1,144	100.0

- No other candidates filed to run in the district.

General election

Chittenden-6 general election, 2022
Party	Candidate	Votes	%
Democratic	Kate Lalley	1,678	98.3
Write-in	Write-ins	29	1.7
Total votes		1,707	100.0
Democratic hold			

=== Chittenden-7 ===
- Elects one representative.

Democratic primary

Chittenden-7 Democratic primary, 2022
Party	Candidate	Votes	%
Democratic	Jessica Brumsted (incumbent)	909	99.2
Democratic	Write-ins	7	0.8
Total votes		916	100.0

- No other candidates filed to run in the district.

General election

Chittenden-7 general election, 2022
Party	Candidate	Votes	%
Democratic	Jessica Brumsted (incumbent)	1,912	98.4
Write-in	Write-ins	32	1.6
Total votes		1,944	100.0
Democratic hold			

=== Chittenden-8 ===
- Elects one representative.

Democratic primary

Chittenden-8 Democratic primary, 2022
Party	Candidate	Votes	%
Democratic	Noah Hyman	782	99.9
Democratic	Write-ins	1	0.1
Total votes		783	100.0

- No other candidates filed to run in the district.

General election

Chittenden-8 general election, 2022
Party	Candidate	Votes	%
Democratic	Noah Hyman	1,761	97.6
Write-in	Write-ins	43	2.4
Total votes		1,804	100.0
Democratic hold			

=== Chittenden-9 ===
- Elects one representative.

Democratic primary

Chittenden-9 Democratic primary, 2022
Party	Candidate	Votes	%
Democratic	Emily Krasnow	693	100.0
Total votes		693	100.0

- No other candidates filed to run in the district.

General election

Chittenden-9 general election, 2022
Party	Candidate	Votes	%
Democratic	Emily Krasnow	1,575	98.9
Write-in	Write-ins	17	1.1
Total votes		1,592	100.0
Democratic hold			

=== Chittenden-10 ===
- Elects one representative.

Democratic primary

Chittenden-10 Democratic primary, 2022
Party	Candidate	Votes	%
Democratic	Kate Nugent	636	100.0
Total votes		363	100.0

- No other candidates filed to run in the district.

General election

Chittenden-10 general election, 2022
Party	Candidate	Votes	%
Democratic	Kate Nugent	1,489	97.7
Write-in	Write-ins	35	2.3
Total votes		1,524	100.0
Democratic hold			

=== Chittenden-11 ===
- Elects one representative.

Democratic primary

Chittenden-11 Democratic primary, 2022
Party	Candidate	Votes	%
Democratic	Brian Minier	577	100.0
Total votes		577	100.0

- No other candidates filed to run in the district.

General election

Chittenden-11 general election, 2022
Party	Candidate	Votes	%
Democratic	Brian Minier	1,385	99.1
Write-in	Write-ins	12	0.9
Total votes		1,397	100.0
Democratic hold			

=== Chittenden-12 ===
- Elects one representative.

Democratic primary

Chittenden-12 Democratic primary, 2022
Party	Candidate	Votes	%
Democratic	Martin LaLonde (incumbent)	1,031	100.0
Total votes		1,031	100.0

- No other candidates filed to run in the district.

General election

Chittenden-12 general election, 2022
Party	Candidate	Votes	%
Democratic	Martin LaLonde (incumbent)	1,997	99.2
Write-in	Write-ins	16	0.8
Total votes		2,013	100.0
Democratic hold			

=== Chittenden-13 ===
- Elects two representatives.

Democratic primary

Chittenden-13 Democratic primary, 2022
Party	Candidate	Votes	%
Democratic	Tiff Bluemle (incumbent)	1,795	50.4
Democratic	Gabrielle Stebbins (incumbent)	1,750	49.1
Democratic	Write-ins	20	0.6
Total votes		3,565	100.0

- No Republican candidates filed to run in the district.

General election

Chittenden-13 general election, 2022
Party	Candidate	Votes	%
Democratic	Tiff Bluemle (incumbent)	3,083	46.8
Democratic	Gabrielle Stebbins (incumbent)	2,863	43.5
Independent	Tom Licata	607	9.2
Write-in	Write-ins	35	0.5
Total votes		6,588	100.0
Democratic hold			
Democratic hold			

=== Chittenden-14 ===
- Elects two representatives.

Democratic primary

Chittenden-14 Democratic primary, 2022
Party	Candidate	Votes	%
Democratic	Barbara Rachelson (incumbent)	381	55.4
Democratic	Mary-Katherine Stone	298	43.3
Democratic	Write-ins	9	1.3
Total votes		688	100.0

- No other candidates filed to run in the district.

General election

Chittenden-14 general election, 2022
Party	Candidate	Votes	%
Democratic/Progressive	Barbara Rachelson (incumbent) (Note: Candidate received the nominations of both the Democratic and Progressive parties and will be listed on the ballot as "Democratic/Progressive" (candidate is primarily a Democrat).)	1,002	52.5
Democratic/Progressive	Mary-Katherine Stone	873	45.8
Write-in	Write-ins	32	1.7
Total votes		1,907	100.0
Democratic hold			
Democratic hold			

=== Chittenden-15 ===
- Elects two representatives.

Democratic primary

Chittenden-15 Democratic primary, 2022
Party	Candidate	Votes	%
Progressive	Brian Cina (incumbent) (Note: Registered Progressive candidate running for the Democratic nomination.)	834	54.5
Progressive	Troy Headrick	680	44.4
Democratic	Write-ins	17	1.1
Total votes		1,534	100.0

- No other candidates filed to run in the district.

General election

Chittenden-15 general election, 2022
Party	Candidate	Votes	%
Progressive/Democratic	Brian Cina (incumbent) (Note: Candidate received the nominations of both the Progressive and Democratic parties and will be listed on the ballot as "Progressive/Democratic" (candidate is primarily a Progressive).)	1,858	52.9
Progressive/Democratic	Troy Headrick	1,604	45.6
Write-in	Write-ins	53	1.5
Total votes		3,515	100.0
Progressive hold			
Progressive hold			

=== Chittenden-16 ===
- Elects two representatives.

Democratic primary

Chittenden-16 Democratic primary, 2022
Party	Candidate	Votes	%
Democratic	Jill Krowinski (incumbent)	934	46.6
Progressive	Kate Logan	708	35.3
Democratic	Ryan Addario	361	18.0
Total votes		2,003	100.0

- No other candidates filed to run in the district.

General election

Chittenden-16 general election, 2022
Party	Candidate	Votes	%
Democratic	Jill Krowinski (incumbent)	2,005	54.3
Progressive/Democratic	Kate Logan	1,660	45.0
Write-in	Write-ins	26	0.7
Total votes		3,691	100.0
Democratic hold			
Progressive hold			

=== Chittenden-17 ===
- Elects one representative.

Democratic primary

Chittenden-17 Democratic primary, 2022
Party	Candidate	Votes	%
Progressive	Emma Mulvaney-Stanak (incumbent)	930	98.3
Democratic	Write-ins	16	1.7
Total votes		946	100.0

- No other candidates filed to run in the district.

General election

Chittenden-17 general election, 2022
Party	Candidate	Votes	%
Progressive/Democratic	Emma Mulvaney-Stanak (incumbent)	1,755	96.9
Write-in	Write-ins	56	3.1
Total votes		1,811	100.0
Progressive hold			

=== Chittenden-18 ===
- Elects two representatives.

Democratic primary

Chittenden-18 Democratic primary, 2022
Party	Candidate	Votes	%
Democratic	Carol Ode (incumbent)	1,601	53.8
Democratic	Robert Hooper (incumbent)	1,356	45.6
Democratic	Write-ins	19	0.6
Total votes			100.0

- No other candidates filed to run in the district.

General election

Chittenden-18 general election, 2022
Party	Candidate	Votes	%
Democratic	Carol Ode (incumbent)	2,956	50.6
Democratic	Robert Hooper (incumbent)	2,756	47.4
Write-in	Write-ins	116	2.0
Total votes		5,828	100.0
Democratic hold			
Democratic hold			

=== Chittenden-19 ===
- Elects two representatives.

Democratic primary

Chittenden-19 Democratic primary, 2022
Party	Candidate	Votes	%
Democratic	Sarita Austin (incumbent)	1,131	95.4
Democratic	Write-ins	55	4.6
Total votes		1,186	100.0

Republican primary

Chittenden-19 Republican primary, 2022
Party	Candidate	Votes	%
Republican	Patrick Brennan (incumbent)	397	97.3
Republican	Write-ins	11	2.7
Total votes		408	100.0

General election

Chittenden-19 general election, 2022
Party	Candidate	Votes	%
Democratic	Sarita Austin (incumbent)	2,428	44.9
Republican	Patrick Brennan (incumbent)	2,317	42.9
Libertarian	Spencer Sherman	628	11.6
Write-in	Write-ins	30	0.6
Total votes		5,403	100.0
Democratic hold			
Republican hold			

=== Chittenden-20 ===
- Elects two representatives.

Democratic primary

Chittenden-20 Democratic primary, 2022
Party	Candidate	Votes	%
Democratic	Curt Taylor (incumbent)	697	55.3
Democratic	Seth Chase (incumbent)	564	44.7
Total votes		1,261	100.0

Republican primary

Chittenden-20 Republican primary, 2022
Party	Candidate	Votes	%
Republican	Doug Wood	209	89.3
Republican	Tom LeSage (write-in)	10	4.3
Republican	Other write-ins	15	6.4
Total votes		234	100.0

General election

Chittenden-20 general election, 2022
Party	Candidate	Votes	%
Democratic	Curt Taylor (incumbent)	1,776	33.4
Democratic	Seth Chase (incumbent)	1,624	30.5
Republican	Doug Wood	976	18.3
Republican	Tom LeSage	936	17.6
Write-in	Write-ins	7	0.1
Total votes		5,319	100.0
Democratic hold			
Democratic hold			

=== Chittenden-21 ===
- Elects two representatives.

Democratic primary

Chittenden-21 Democratic primary, 2022
Party	Candidate	Votes	%
Progressive	Taylor Small (incumbent)	1,011	53.0
Democratic	Daisy Berbeco	883	46.3
Democratic	Write-ins	13	0.7
Total votes		1,907	100.0

General election

Chittenden-21 general election, 2022
Party	Candidate	Votes	%
Democratic	Daisy Berbeco	1,813	43.6
Progressive/Democratic	Taylor Small (incumbent)	1,735	41.7
Independent	Jordan Matte	575	13.8
Write-in	Write-ins	38	0.9
Total votes		4,161	100.0
Democratic hold			
Progressive hold			

=== Chittenden-22 ===
- Elects two representatives.

Democratic primary

Chittenden-22 Democratic primary, 2022
Party	Candidate	Votes	%
Democratic	Lori Houghton (incumbent)	1,284	51.1
Democratic	Karen Dolan (incumbent)	1,216	48.4
Democratic	Write-ins	13	0.5
Total votes		2,513	100.0

Republican primary

Chittenden-22 Republican primary, 2022
Party	Candidate	Votes	%
Republican	Seth Manley	235	73.7
Republican	Write-ins	84	26.3
Total votes		319	100.0

General election

Chittenden-22 general election, 2022
Party	Candidate	Votes	%
Democratic	Lori Houghton (incumbent)	2,860	41.6
Democratic	Karen Dolan (incumbent)	2,709	39.4
Republican	Seth Manley	1,271	18.5
Write-in	Write-ins	34	0.5
Total votes		6,874	100.0
Democratic hold			
Democratic hold			

=== Chittenden-23 ===
- Elects two representatives.

Democratic primary

Chittenden-23 Democratic primary, 2022
Party	Candidate	Votes	%
Democratic	Leonora Dodge	1,038	51.1
Democratic	Rey Garofano (incumbent)	984	48.4
Democratic	Write-ins	10	0.5
Total votes		2,032	100.0

Republican primary

Chittenden-23 Republican primary, 2022
Party	Candidate	Votes	%
Republican	Maryse Dunbar (write-in)	86	51.2
Republican	Denis White (write-in)	32	19.0
Republican	Other write-ins	50	29.8
Total votes		168	100.0

General election

Chittenden-23 general election, 2022
Party	Candidate	Votes	%
Democratic	Leonora Dodge	2,370	34.2
Democratic	Rey Garofano (incumbent)	2,173	31.3
Republican	Maryse Dunbar	1,250	18.0
Republican	Denis White	1,133	16.3
Write-in	Write-ins	6	0.1
Total votes		6,932	100.0
Democratic hold			
Democratic hold			

=== Chittenden-24 ===
- Elects one representative.

Democratic primary

Chittenden-24 Democratic primary, 2022
Party	Candidate	Votes	%
Democratic	Alyssa Black (incumbent)	741	99.1
Democratic	Write-ins	7	0.9
Total votes		748	100.0

Republican primary

Chittenden-24 Republican primary, 2022
Party	Candidate	Votes	%
Republican	Roger Drury	162	94.2
Republican	Write-ins	10	5.8
Total votes		172	100.0

General election

Chittenden-24 general election, 2022
Party	Candidate	Votes	%
Democratic	Alyssa Black (incumbent)	1,400	63.6
Republican	Roger Drury	796	36.2
Write-in	Write-ins	4	0.2
Total votes		2,200	100.0
Democratic hold			

=== Chittenden-25 ===
- Elects one representative.

Democratic primary

Chittenden-25 Democratic primary, 2022
Party	Candidate	Votes	%
Democratic	Julia Andrews	521	97.9
Democratic	Write-ins	11	2.1
Total votes		532	100.0

Republican primary

Chittenden-25 Republican primary, 2022
Party	Candidate	Votes	%
Republican	Allison Duquette	217	97.3
Republican	Write-ins	6	2.3
Total votes		223	100.0

General election

Chittenden-25 general election, 2022
Party	Candidate	Votes	%
Democratic	Julia Andrews	1,124	54.4
Republican	Allison Duquette	941	45.5
Write-in	Write-ins	3	0.1
Total votes		2,068	100.0
Democratic hold			

=== Chittenden-Franklin ===
- Elects two representatives.

Republican primary

Chittenden-Franklin Republican primary, 2022
Party	Candidate	Votes	%
Republican	Chris Mattos (incumbent)	376	51.9
Republican	Chris Taylor	344	47.5
Republican	Write-ins	4	0.6
Total votes		724	100.0

Democratic primary

Chittenden-Franklin Democratic primary, 2022
Party	Candidate	Votes	%
Democratic	Emily Hecker (write-in)	25	18.2
Democratic	Other write-ins	112	81.8
Total votes		137	100.0

General election

Chittenden-Franklin general election, 2022
Party	Candidate	Votes	%
Republican	Chris Mattos (incumbent)	1,758	35.9
Republican	Chris Taylor	1,586	32.4
Democratic	Emily Hecker	1,533	31.3
Write-in	Write-ins	23	0.5
Total votes		4,902	100.0
Republican hold			
Republican hold			

=== Essex-Caledonia ===
- Elects one representative.

Republican primary

Essex-Caledonia Republican primary, 2022
Party	Candidate	Votes	%
Republican	Terri Lynn Williams (incumbent)	205	58.1
Republican	John Kascenska (incumbent)	137	38.8
Republican	Write-ins	11	3.1
Total votes		353	100.0

- No other candidates filed to run in the district.

General election

Essex-Caledonia general election, 2022
Party	Candidate	Votes	%
Republican	Terri Lynn Williams (incumbent)	1,335	96.2
Write-in	Write-ins	53	3.8
Total votes		1,388	100.0
Republican hold			

=== Essex-Orleans ===
- Elects one representative.

Democratic primary

Essex-Orleans Democratic primary, 2022
Party	Candidate	Votes	%
Democratic	Peggy Stevens	309	93.6
Democratic	Write-ins	21	6.4
Total votes		330	100.0

Republican primary

Essex-Orleans Republican primary, 2022
Party	Candidate	Votes	%
Republican	Larry Labor	310	81.8
Republican	Erin Testut	67	67
Republican	Write-ins	2	0.5
Total votes		379	100.0

General election

Essex-Orleans general election, 2022
Party	Candidate	Votes	%
Republican	Larry Labor	1,142	60.2
Democratic	Peggy Stevens	746	39.5
Write-in	Write-ins	3	0.2
Total votes		1,891	100.0
Republican gain from Independent			

=== Franklin-1 ===
- Elects two representatives.

Republican primary

Franklin-1 Republican primary, 2022
Party	Candidate	Votes	%
Republican	Carolyn Branagan	438	52.4
Republican	Ashley Bartley	392	46.9
Republican	Write-ins	6	0.7
Total votes		836	100.0

Democratic primary

Franklin-1 Democratic primary, 2022
Party	Candidate	Votes	%
Democratic	Al Maynard	711	54.9
Democratic	Devon Thomas	572	44.2
Democratic	Write-ins	12	0.9
Total votes		1,295	100.0

General election

Franklin-1 general election, 2022
Party	Candidate	Votes	%
Republican	Carolyn Branagan	2,249	30.0
Republican	Ashley Bartley	2,009	26.8
Democratic	Al Maynard	1,817	24.2
Democratic	Devon Thomas	1,409	18.8
Write-in	Write-ins	15	0.2
Total votes		7,499	100.0
Republican hold			
Republican hold			

=== Franklin-2 ===
- Elects one representative.

Republican primary

Franklin-2 Republican primary, 2022
Party	Candidate	Votes	%
Republican	Eileen Dickinson (incumbent)	219	98.2
Republican	Write-ins	4	1.8
Total votes		223	100.0

- No other candidates filed for the district.

General election

Franklin-2 general election, 2022
Party	Candidate	Votes	%
Republican/Democratic	Eileen Dickinson (incumbent) (Note: Candidate received the nominations of both the Republican and Democratic parties and was listed on the ballot as "Republican/Democratic" (candidate is primarily a Republican))	1,577	99.2
Write-in	Write-ins	13	0.8
Total votes		1,590	100.0
Republican hold			

=== Franklin-3 ===
- Elects one representative.

Democratic primary

Franklin-3 Democratic primary, 2022
Party	Candidate	Votes	%
Democratic	Mike McCarthy (incumbent)	412	95.2
Democratic	Write-ins	21	4.8
Total votes			100.0

Republican primary

Franklin-3 Republican primary, 2022
Party	Candidate	Votes	%
Republican	Joe Luneau	147	98.0
Republican	Write-ins	3	2.0
Total votes		150	100.0

General election

Franklin-3 general election, 2022
Party	Candidate	Votes	%
Democratic	Mike McCarthy (incumbent)	926	57.4
Republican	Joe Luneau	684	42.4
Write-in	Write-ins	3	0.2
Total votes		1,613	100.0
Democratic hold			

=== Franklin-4 ===
- Elects two representatives.

Republican primary

Franklin-4 Republican primary, 2022
Party	Candidate	Votes	%
Republican	Thomas Oliver	382	49.7
Republican	Matthew Walker (incumbent)	380	49.4
Republican	Write-ins	7	0.9
Total votes		769	100.0

Democratic primary

Franklin-4 Democratic primary, 2022
Party	Candidate	Votes	%
Republican	Thomas Oliver (write-in)	49	30.6
Republican	Matthew Walker (incumbent) (write-in)	41	25.6
Democratic	Other write-ins	70	43.8
Total votes		160	100.0

- No other candidates filed to run in the district.

General election

Franklin-4 general election, 2022
Party	Candidate	Votes	%
Republican/Democratic	Matthew Walker (incumbent)	2,249	49.9
Republican/Democratic	Thomas Oliver	2,193	48.7
Write-in	Write-ins	64	1.4
Total votes		4,507	100.0
Republican hold			
Republican hold			

=== Franklin-5 ===
- Elects two representatives.

Republican primary

Franklin-5 Republican primary, 2022
Party	Candidate	Votes	%
Republican	Lisa Hango (incumbent)	437	51.1
Republican	Wayne Laroche (incumbent)	408	47.7
Republican	Write-ins	11	1.3
Total votes		856	100.0

Democratic primary

Franklin-4 Democratic primary, 2022
Party	Candidate	Votes	%
Republican	Lisa Hango (incumbent) (write-in)	95	31.6
Republican	Wayne Laroche (incumbent) (write-in)	90	29.9
Democratic	Other write-ins	116	38.5
Total votes		301	100.0

- No other candidates filed to run in the district.

General election

Franklin-5 general election, 2022
Party	Candidate	Votes	%
Republican/Democratic	Lisa Hango (incumbent)	2,290	50.3
Republican/Democratic	Wayne Laroche (incumbent)	2,211	48.6
Write-in	Write-ins	52	1.1
Total votes		4,553	100.0
Republican hold			
Republican hold			

=== Franklin-6 ===
- Elects one representative.

Republican primary

Franklin-6 Republican primary, 2022
Party	Candidate	Votes	%
Republican	James Gregoire (incumbent)	221	94.4
Republican	Write-ins	13	5.6
Total votes		234	100.0

Democratic primary

Franklin-6 Democratic primary, 2022
Party	Candidate	Votes	%
Democratic	Brenda Churchill	425	96.4
Democratic	Write-ins	16	3.6
Total votes		441	100.0

General election

Franklin-6 general election, 2022
Party	Candidate	Votes	%
Republican	James Gregoire (incumbent)	1,223	58.5
Democratic	Brenda Churchill	861	41.2
Write-in	Write-ins	8	0.4
Total votes		2,092	100.0
Republican hold			

=== Franklin-7 ===
- Elects one representative.

Republican primary

Franklin-7 Republican primary, 2022
Party	Candidate	Votes	%
Republican	Allen Demar	273	90.4
Republican	Zacharia Messier	29	9.6
Total votes		302	100.0

Democratic primary

Franklin-7 Democratic primary, 2022
Party	Candidate	Votes	%
Progressive	Cindy Weed	278	90.6
Democratic	Write-ins	29	9.4
Total votes		307	100.0

General election

Franklin-7 general election, 2022
Party	Candidate	Votes	%
Republican	Allen Demar	936	55.2
Progressive/Democratic	Cindy Weed	616	36.3
Independent	Suzi Hull-Casavant	141	8.3
Write-in	Write-ins	4	0.2
Total votes		1,697	100.0
Republican hold			

=== Franklin-8 ===
- Elects one representative.

Republican primary

Franklin-8 Republican primary, 2022
Party	Candidate	Votes	%
Republican	Casey Toof (incumbent)	192	100.0
Total votes		192	100.0

Democratic primary

Franklin-8 Democratic primary, 2022
Party	Candidate	Votes	%
Democratic	Lauren Dees-Erickson	329	91.1
Democratic	Write-ins	32	8.9
Total votes		361	100.0

General election

Franklin-8 general election, 2022
Party	Candidate	Votes	%
Republican	Casey Toof (incumbent)	984	56.6
Democratic	Lauren Dees-Erickson	751	43.2
Write-in	Write-ins	3	0.2
Total votes		1,738	100.0
Republican hold			

=== Grand Isle-Chittenden ===
- Elects two representatives.

Republican primary

Grand Isle-Chittenden Republican primary, 2022
Party	Candidate	Votes	%
Republican	Michael Morgan (incumbent)	603	53.5
Republican	Andy Paradee	517	45.8
Republican	Write-ins	8	0.7
Total votes		1,128	100.0

Democratic primary

Grand Isle-Chittenden Democratic primary, 2022
Party	Candidate	Votes	%
Democratic	Josie Leavitt (write-in)	578	40.5
Democratic	Annie Brabazon (write-in)	577	40.5
Democratic	Other write-ins	271	19.0
Total votes		1,426	100.0

After the primary, Brabazon was removed from the ballot and replaced with Karin Ames. General election

Grand Isle-Chittenden general election, 2022
Party	Candidate	Votes	%
Republican	Michael Morgan (incumbent)	2,241	25.8
Democratic	Josie Leavitt	2,151	24.8
Republican	Andy Paradee	2,141	24.7
Democratic	Karin Ames	2,140	24.6
Write-in	Write-ins	10	0.1
Total votes		8,683	100.0
Republican hold			
Democratic gain from Republican			

=== Lamoille-1 ===
- Elects one representative.

Democratic primary

Lamoille-1 Democratic primary, 2022
Party	Candidate	Votes	%
Democratic	Scott Weathers	494	87.0
Democratic	Write-ins	74	13.0
Total votes		568	100.0

General election

Lamoille-1 general election, 2022
Party	Candidate	Votes	%
Independent	Jed Lipsky	1,386	61.0
Democratic	Scott Weathers	881	38.8
Write-in	Write-ins	5	0.2
Total votes		2,272	100.0
Independent gain from Republican			

=== Lamoille-2 ===
- Elects two representatives.

Democratic primary

Lamoille-2 Democratic primary, 2022
Party	Candidate	Votes	%
Democratic	Kate Donnally (incumbent)	727	50.5
Democratic	Daniel Noyes (incumbent)	698	48.5
Democratic	Write-ins	14	1.0
Total votes		1,439	100.0

Republican primary

Lamoille-2 Republican primary, 2022
Party	Candidate	Votes	%
Republican	Richard Bailey	267	54.8
Republican	Mac Teale	211	43.3
Republican	Write-ins	9	1.8
Total votes		487	100.0

General election

Lamoille-2 general election, 2022
Party	Candidate	Votes	%
Democratic	Kate Donnally (incumbent)	1,861	31.5
Democratic	Daniel Noyes (incumbent)	1,827	30.9
Republican/Libertarian	Richard Bailey (Note: Candidate received the nominations of both the Republican and Libertarian parties and was listed on the ballot as "Republican/Libertarian" (candidate is primarily a Republican))	1,252	21.2
Republican/Libertarian	Mac Teale	952	16.1
Write-in	Write-ins	14	0.2
Total votes		5,906	100.0

=== Lamoille-3 ===
- Elects two representatives.

Democratic primary

Lamoille-3 Democratic primary, 2022
Party	Candidate	Votes	%
Democratic	Lucy Boyden	588	97.5
Democratic	Write-ins	15	2.5
Total votes		603	100.0

Republican primary

Lamoille-3 Republican primary, 2022
Party	Candidate	Votes	%
Republican	Rebecca Pitre	202	97.1
Republican	Write-ins	6	2.9
Total votes		208	100.0

General election

Lamoille-3 general election, 2022
Party	Candidate	Votes	%
Democratic	Lucy Boyden	1,470	70.0
Republican/Libertarian	Rebecca Pitre	624	29.7
Write-in	Write-ins	6	0.3
Total votes		2,100	100.0
Democratic hold			

=== Lamoille-Washington ===
- Elects two representatives.

Democratic primary

Lamoille-Washington Democratic primary, 2022
Party	Candidate	Votes	%
Democratic	Avram Patt (incumbent)	1,095	52.1
Democratic	Saudia Lamont	972	46.3
Democratic	Write-ins	34	1.6
Total votes		2,101	100.0

Republican primary

Lamoille-Washington Republican primary, 2022
Party	Candidate	Votes	%
Republican	Ben Olsen	268	50.8
Republican	Nichole Loati	245	46.4
Republican	Write-ins	15	2.8
Total votes		528	100.0

General election

Lamoille-Washington general election, 2022
Party	Candidate	Votes	%
Democratic	Saudia Lamont	2,487	33.5
Democratic	Avram Patt (incumbent)	2,446	33.0
Republican	Ben Olsen	1,318	17.8
Republican/Libertarian	Nichole Loati	1,145	15.4
Write-in	Write-ins	26	0.4
Total votes		7,422	100.0
Democratic hold			
Democratic hold			

=== Orange-1 ===
- Elects one representative.

Republican primary

Orange-1 Republican primary, 2022
Party	Candidate	Votes	%
Republican	Samantha Lefebvre (incumbent)	238	98.8
Republican	Write-ins	3	1.2
Total votes		241	100.0

Democratic primary

Orange-1 Democratic primary, 2022
Party	Candidate	Votes	%
Democratic	Carl Demrow	502	98.4
Democratic	Write-ins	8	1.6
Total votes		510	100.0

General election

Orange-1 general election, 2022
Party	Candidate	Votes	%
Democratic	Carl Demrow	1,071	53.4
Republican	Samantha Lefebvre (incumbent)	934	46.6
Write-in	Write-ins	1	0.0
Total votes		2,006	100.0
Democratic gain from Republican			

=== Orange-2 ===
- Elects one representative.

Democratic primary

Orange-2 Democratic primary, 2022
Party	Candidate	Votes	%
Democratic	Monique Priestly	515	73.6
Democratic	Lance Mills	185	26.4
Total votes		700	100.0

Republican primary

Orange-2 Republican primary, 2022
Party	Candidate	Votes	%
Republican	Zachary Lang	180	96.3
Republican	Write-ins	7	3.7
Total votes		187	100.0

General election

Orange-2 general election, 2022
Party	Candidate	Votes	%
Democratic	Monique Priestly	1,218	62.8
Republican	Zachary Lang	718	37.0
Write-in	Write-ins	4	0.2
Total votes		1,940	100.0
Democratic hold			

=== Orange-3 ===
- Elects one representative.

Republican primary

Orange-3 Republican primary, 2022
Party	Candidate	Votes	%
Republican	Rodney Graham (incumbent)	223	96.5
Republican	Write-ins	8	3.5
Total votes			100.0

Democratic primary

Orange-3 Democratic primary, 2022
Party	Candidate	Votes	%
Democratic	Seth Keighley	281	97.9
Democratic	Write-ins	6	2.1
Total votes		287	100.0

General election

Orange-3 general election, 2022
Party	Candidate	Votes	%
Republican	Rodney Graham (incumbent)	1,052	60.6
Democratic	Seth Keighley	677	39.0
Write-in	Write-ins	6	0.3
Total votes		1,735	100.0
Republican hold			

=== Orange-Caledonia ===
- Elects one representative.

Republican primary

Orange-Caledonia Republican primary, 2022
Party	Candidate	Votes	%
Republican	Joe Parsons (incumbent)	216	98.6
Republican	Write-ins	3	1.4
Total votes		219	100.0

Democratic primary

Orange-Caledonia Democratic primary, 2022
Party	Candidate	Votes	%
Democratic	Kelsey Root-Winchester	441	97.8
Democratic	Write-ins	10	2.2
Total votes		451	100.0

General election

Orange-Caledonia general election, 2022
Party	Candidate	Votes	%
Republican	Joe Parsons (incumbent)	1,016	52.9
Democratic	Kelsey Root-Winchester	902	47.0
Write-in	Write-ins	2	0.1
Total votes		1,920	100.0
Republican hold			

=== Orange-Washington-Addison ===
- Elects two representatives.

Democratic primary

Orange-Washington-Addison Democratic primary, 2022
Party	Candidate	Votes	%
Democratic	Jay Hooper (incumbent)	1,085	53.4
Democratic	Larry Satcowitz (incumbent)	923	45.4
Democratic	Write-ins	23	1.1
Total votes		2,031	100.0

Republican primary

Orange-Washington-Addison Republican primary, 2022
Party	Candidate	Votes	%
Republican	Wayne Townsend	295	58.2
Republican	Jackie Klar	207	40.8
Republican	Write-ins	5	1.0
Total votes			100.0

General election

Orange-Washington-Addison general election, 2022
Party	Candidate	Votes	%
Democratic	Jay Hooper (incumbent)	2,644	36.6
Democratic	Larry Satcowitz (incumbent)	2,060	28.5
Republican	Wayne Townsend	1,325	18.3
Republican	Jackie Klar	1,181	16.3
Write-in	Write-ins	14	0.2
Total votes		7,224	100.0
Democratic hold			
Democratic hold			

=== Orleans-1 ===
- Elects one representative.

Republican primary

Orleans-1 Republican primary, 2022
Party	Candidate	Votes	%
Republican	Brian Smith (incumbent)	273	98.9
Republican	Write-ins	3	1.1
Total votes		276	100.0

Democratic primary

Orleans-1 Democratic primary, 2022
Party	Candidate	Votes	%
Democratic	Aimee Alexander (write-in)	76	69.7
Republican	Brian Smith (incumbent) (write-in)	25	22.9
Democratic	Other write-ins	8	7.3
Total votes		109	100.0

General election

Orleans-1 general election, 2022
Party	Candidate	Votes	%
Republican	Brian Smith (incumbent)	1,141	59.9
Democratic	Aimee Alexander	760	39.9
Write-in	Write-ins	5	0.3
Total votes		1,906	100.0
Republican hold			

=== Orleans-2 ===
- Elects one representative.

Republican primary

Orleans-2 Republican primary, 2022
Party	Candidate	Votes	%
Republican	Woody Page (incumbent)	166	98.8
Republican	Write-ins	2	1.2
Total votes		168	100.0

- No other candidates filed to run in the district.

General election

Orleans-2 general election, 2022
Party	Candidate	Votes	%
Republican	Woody Page (incumbent)	1,034	96.3
Write-in	Write-ins	40	3.7
Total votes		1,074	100.0
Republican hold			

=== Orleans-3 ===
- Elects one representative.

Democratic primary

Orleans-3 Democratic primary, 2022
Party	Candidate	Votes	%
Democratic	David Templeman (write-in)	82	93.2
Democratic	Other write-ins	6	6.8
Total votes		88	100.0

- No other candidates filed for the seat.

General election

Orleans-3 general election, 2022
Party	Candidate	Votes	%
Democratic	David Templeman	990	93.3
Write-in	Write-ins	71	6.7
Total votes		1,061	100.0
Democratic gain from Republican			

=== Orleans-4 ===
- Elects one representative.

Democratic primary

Orleans-4 Democratic primary, 2022
Party	Candidate	Votes	%
Democratic	Katherine Sims (incumbent)	638	98.3
Democratic	Write-ins	11	1.7
Total votes		649	100.0

Republican primary

Orleans-4 Republican primary, 2022
Party	Candidate	Votes	%
Republican	Vicki Strong (incumbent)	202	87.4
Republican	Write-ins	29	12.6
Total votes			100.0

General election

Orleans-4 general election, 2022
Party	Candidate	Votes	%
Democratic	Katherine Sims (incumbent)	1,241	61.0
Republican	Vicki Strong (incumbent)	791	38.9
Write-in	Write-ins	3	0.1
Total votes		2,035	100.0
Democratic hold			
Republican loss (seat eliminated)			

=== Orleans-Lamoille ===
- Elects two representatives.

Republican primary

Orleans-Lamoille Republican primary, 2022
Party	Candidate	Votes	%
Republican	Mark Higley (incumbent)	413	53.8
Republican	Michael Marcotte (incumbent)	348	45.3
Republican	Write-ins	7	0.9
Total votes		768	100.0

Democratic primary

Orleans-Lamoille Democratic primary, 2022
Party	Candidate	Votes	%
Republican	Mark Higley (incumbent) (write-in)	64	27.0
Republican	Michael Marcotte (incumbent) (write-in)	51	21.5
Democratic	Other write-ins	122	51.5
Total votes		237	100.0

General election

Orleans-Lamoille general election, 2022
Party	Candidate	Votes	%
Republican/Democratic	Mark Higley (incumbent)	2,360	50.8
Republican/Democratic	Michael Marcotte (incumbent)	2,216	47.7
Write-in	Write-ins	69	1.5
Total votes		4,645	100.0
Republican hold			
Republican hold			

=== Rutland-1 ===
- Elects one representative.

Republican primary

Rutland-1 Republican primary, 2022
Party	Candidate	Votes	%
Republican	Patricia McCoy (incumbent)	281	100.0
Total votes		281	100.0

- No other candidates filed to run in the district.

General election

Rutland-1 general election, 2022
Party	Candidate	Votes	%
Republican	Patricia McCoy (incumbent)	1,493	97.6
Write-in	Write-ins	36	2.4
Total votes		1,529	100.0
Republican hold			

=== Rutland-2 ===
- Elects two representatives.

Republican primary

Rutland-2 Republican primary, 2022
Party	Candidate	Votes	%
Republican	Arthur Peterson (incumbent)	559	51.1
Republican	Tom Burditt (incumbent)	527	48.2
Republican	Write-ins	8	0.7
Total votes		1,094	100.0

Democratic primary

Rutland-2 Democratic primary, 2022
Party	Candidate	Votes	%
Democratic	Dave Potter	709	53.0
Democratic	Ken Fredette	618	46.2
Democratic	Write-ins	10	0.7
Total votes		1,337	100.0

General election

Rutland-2 general election, 2022
Party	Candidate	Votes	%
Republican	Tom Burditt (incumbent)	2,079	27.1
Republican	Arthur Peterson (incumbent)	1,952	25.5
Democratic	Dave Potter	1,945	25.4
Democratic	Ken Fredette	1,687	22.0
Write-in	Write-ins	1	0.0
Total votes		7,664	100.0
Republican hold			
Republican hold			

=== Rutland-3 ===
- Elects one representative.

Republican primary

Rutland-3 Republican primary, 2022
Party	Candidate	Votes	%
Republican	Jarrod Sammis	267	100.0
Total votes		267	100.0

Democratic primary

Rutland-3 Democratic primary, 2022
Party	Candidate	Votes	%
Democratic	Mary Droege	292	99.3
Democratic	Write-ins	2	0.7
Total votes		294	100.0

General election

Rutland-3 general election, 2022
Party	Candidate	Votes	%
Republican	Jarrod Sammis	836	51.2
Democratic	Mary Droege	793	48.5
Write-in	Write-ins	5	0.3
Total votes		1,632	100.0
Republican hold			

=== Rutland-4 ===
- Elects one representative.

Republican primary

Rutland-4 Republican primary, 2022
Party	Candidate	Votes	%
Republican	Paul Clifford	258	98.1
Republican	Write-ins	5	1.9
Total votes		268	100.0

- No other candidates filed to run in the district.

General election

Rutland-4 general election, 2022
Party	Candidate	Votes	%
Republican	Paul Clifford	1,530	94.0
Write-in	Write-ins	98	6.0
Total votes		1,628	100.0
Republican hold			

=== Rutland-5 ===
- Elects one representative.

Republican primary

Rutland-5 Republican primary, 2022
Party	Candidate	Votes	%
Republican	Eric Maguire	229	98.7
Republican	Write-ins	3	1.3
Total votes		232	100.0

- No other candidates filed to run in the district.

General election

Rutland-5 general election, 2022
Party	Candidate	Votes	%
Republican	Eric Maguire	1,368	95.7
Write-in	Write-ins	62	4.3
Total votes		1,430	100.0
Republican hold			

=== Rutland-6 ===
- Elects one representative.

Democratic primary

Rutland-6 Democratic primary, 2022
Party	Candidate	Votes	%
Democratic	Mary Howard (incumbent)	237	98.8
Democratic	Write-ins	3	1.2
Total votes		240	100.0

Republican primary

Rutland-6 Republican primary, 2022
Party	Candidate	Votes	%
Republican	Cindy Laskevich	117	97.5
Republican	Write-ins	3	2.5
Total votes		120	100.0

General election

Rutland-6 general election, 2022
Party	Candidate	Votes	%
Democratic	Mary Howard (incumbent)	727	59.8
Republican	Cindy Laskevich	484	39.8
Write-in	Write-ins	4	0.3
Total votes		1,214	100.0
Democratic hold			

=== Rutland-7 ===
- Elects one representative.

Democratic primary

Rutland-7 Democratic primary, 2022
Party	Candidate	Votes	%
Democratic	William Notte (incumbent)	307	98.1
Democratic	Write-ins	6	1.9
Total votes		313	100.0

- No other candidates filed to run in the district

General election

Rutland-7 general election, 2022
Party	Candidate	Votes	%
Democratic	William Notte (incumbent)	1,094	87.6
Write-in	Write-ins	155	12.4
Total votes		1,249	100.0
Democratic hold			

=== Rutland-8 ===
- Elects one representative.

Republican primary

Rutland-8 Republican primary, 2022
Party	Candidate	Votes	%
Republican	Butch Shaw (incumbent)	274	98.6
Republican	Write-ins	4	1.4
Total votes		278	100.0

Democratic primary

Rutland-8 Democratic primary, 2022
Party	Candidate	Votes	%
Republican	Butch Shaw (incumbent) (write-in)	28	66.7
Democratic	Other write-ins	14	33.3
Total votes		42	100.0

General election

Rutland-8 general election, 2022
Party	Candidate	Votes	%
Republican/Democratic	Butch Shaw (incumbent)	1,751	97.4
Write-in	Write-ins	46	2.6
Total votes		1,797	100.0
Republican hold			

=== Rutland-9 ===
- Elects one representative.

Democratic primary

Rutland-9 Democratic primary, 2022
Party	Candidate	Votes	%
Democratic	Stephanie Jerome (incumbent)	421	99.5
Democratic	Write-ins	2	0.5
Total votes		423	100.0

- No other candidates filed to run in the district.

General election

Rutland-9 general election, 2022
Party	Candidate	Votes	%
Democratic	Stephanie Jerome (incumbent)	1,303	95.3
Write-in	Write-ins	64	4.7
Total votes		1,367	100.0
Democratic hold			

=== Rutland-10 ===
- Elects one representative.

Republican primary

Rutland-10 Republican primary, 2022
Party	Candidate	Votes	%
Republican	Bill Canfield (incumbent)	245	98.4
Republican	Write-ins	4	1.6
Total votes		249	100.0

- No other candidates filed to run in the district.

General election

Rutland-10 general election, 2022
Party	Candidate	Votes	%
Republican	Bill Canfield (incumbent)	1,282	97.3
Write-in	Write-ins	36	2.7
Total votes		1,318	100.0
Republican hold			

=== Rutland-11 ===
- Elects one representative.

Republican primary

Rutland-11 Republican primary, 2022
Party	Candidate	Votes	%
Republican	Jim Harrison (incumbent)	286	99.3
Republican	Write-ins	2	0.7
Total votes		288	100.0

Democratic primary

Rutland-11 Democratic primary, 2022
Party	Candidate	Votes	%
Republican	Jim Harrison (incumbent) (write-in)	25	65.8
Democratic	Other write-ins	13	34.2
Total votes		38	100.0

General election

Rutland-11 general election, 2022
Party	Candidate	Votes	%
Republican/Democratic	Jim Harrison (incumbent)	1,935	97.3
Write-in	Write-ins	22	2.7
Total votes		1,957	100.0
Republican hold			

=== Rutland-Bennington ===
- Elects one representative.

Republican primary

Rutland-Bennington Republican primary, 2022
Party	Candidate	Votes	%
Republican	Sally Achey (incumbent)	270	98.2
Republican	Write-ins	5	1.8
Total votes		275	100.0

Democratic primary

Rutland-Bennington Democratic primary, 2022
Party	Candidate	Votes	%
Democratic	Christopher Hoyt	525	97.8
Democratic	Write-ins	12	2.2
Total votes		537	100.0

After winning the Democratic nomination, Hoyt withdrew his candidacy for personal reasons. He was replaced on the ballot with former Progressive Rep. Robin Chestnut-Tangerman. General election

Rutland-Bennington general election, 2022
Party	Candidate	Votes	%
Democratic	Robin Chestnut-Tangerman	1,179	53.5
Republican	Sally Achey (incumbent)	1,019	46.2
Write-in	Write-ins	7	0.3
Total votes		2,205	100.0
Democratic gain from Republican			

=== Rutland-Windsor ===
- Elects one representative.

Democratic primary

Rutland-Windsor Democratic primary, 2022
Party	Candidate	Votes	%
Democratic	Logan Nicoll (incumbent)	553	98.9
Democratic	Write-ins	6	1.1
Total votes		559	100.0

- No other candidates filed for the seat.

General election

Rutland-Windsor general election, 2022
Party	Candidate	Votes	%
Democratic	Logan Nicoll (incumbent)	1,648	94.0
Write-in	Write-ins	106	6.0
Total votes		1,754	100.0
Democratic hold			

=== Washington-1 ===
- Elects two representatives.

Republican primary

Washington-1 Republican primary, 2022
Party	Candidate	Votes	%
Republican	Kenneth Goslant (incumbent)	310	51.2
Republican	Anne Donahue (incumbent)	288	47.6
Republican	Write-ins	7	1.2
Total votes		605	100.0

Democratic primary

Washington-1 Democratic primary, 2022
Party	Candidate	Votes	%
Democratic	Laura Hill-Eubanks (write-in)	146	56.2
Republican	Anne Donahue (incumbent) (write-in)	32	12.3
Democratic	Other write-ins	82	31.5
Total votes		260	100.0

General election

Washington-1 general election, 2022
Party	Candidate	Votes	%
Republican/Democratic	Anne Donahue (incumbent)	1,910	38.1
Republican	Kenneth Goslant (incumbent)	1,590	31.7
Democratic/Progressive	Laura Hill-Eubanks	1,484	29.6
Write-in	Write-ins	33	0.7
Total votes		5,017	100.0
Republican hold			
Republican hold			

=== Washington-2 ===
- Elects two representatives.

Democratic primary

Washington-2 Democratic primary, 2022
Party	Candidate	Votes	%
Democratic	Kari Dolan (incumbent)	1,588	53.3
Democratic	Dara Torre	1,333	44.8
Democratic	Write-ins	56	1.9
Total votes		2,977	100.0

General election

Washington-2 general election, 2022
Party	Candidate	Votes	%
Democratic	Kari Dolan (incumbent)	3,109	39.9
Democratic	Dara Torre	2,282	29.3
Independent	Rebecca Baruzzi	1,710	21.9
Independent	Gene Bifano	663	8.5
Write-in	Write-ins	27	0.3
Total votes		7,791	100.0
Democratic hold			
Democratic hold			

=== Washington-3 ===
- Elects two representatives.

Democratic primary

Washington-3 Democratic primary, 2022
Party	Candidate	Votes	%
Democratic	Peter Anthony (incumbent)	695	51.9
Democratic	Jonathan Williams	645	48.1
Total votes		1,340	100.0

Republican primary

Washington-3 Republican primary, 2022
Party	Candidate	Votes	%
Republican	Tom Kelly	279	41.6
Republican	Brian Judd	194	29.0
Republican	Michael Deering II	189	28.2
Republican	Write-ins	8	1.2
Total votes		670	100.0

General election

Washington-3 general election, 2022
Party	Candidate	Votes	%
Democratic	Peter Anthony (incumbent)	1,637	32.9
Democratic	Jonathan Williams	1,314	26.4
Republican	Tom Kelly	1,091	21.9
Republican	Brian Judd	926	18.6
Write-in	Write-ins	10	0.2
Total votes		4,978	100.0
Democratic hold			
Democratic hold			

=== Washington-4 ===
- Elects two representatives.

Democratic primary

Washington-4 Democratic primary, 2022
Party	Candidate	Votes	%
Democratic	Kate McCann	1,275	27.3
Democratic	Conor Casey	1,114	23.9
Democratic	Ethan Parke	873	18.7
Democratic	Ken Jones	822	17.6
Democratic	Merrick Modun	581	12.5
Total votes		4,665	100.0

Republican primary

Washington-4 Republican primary, 2022
Party	Candidate	Votes	%
Republican	Gene Leon (write-in)	12	34.3
Republican	Other write-ins	23	65.7
Total votes		35	100.0

Progressive primary

Washington-4 Progressive primary, 2022
Party	Candidate	Votes	%
Progressive	Glennie Sewell	10	83.3
Progressive	Write-ins	2	16.7
Total votes		12	100.0

General election

Washington-4 general election, 2022
Party	Candidate	Votes	%
Democratic	Kate McCann	2,780	36.4
Democratic	Conor Casey	2,714	35.6
Independent	Dona Bate	1,004	13.2
Republican	Gene Leon	590	7.7
Progressive	Glennie Sewell	512	6.7
Write-in	Write-ins	33	0.4
Total votes		7,633	100.0
Democratic hold			
Democratic hold			

=== Washington-5 ===
- Elects one representative.

Democratic primary

Washington-5 Democratic primary, 2022
Party	Candidate	Votes	%
Democratic	Ela Chapin	746	61.2
Democratic	Theo Kennedy	242	19.9
Democratic	Zachary Sullivan	227	18.6
Democratic	Write-ins	3	0.2
Total votes		1,218	100.0

- No other candidates filed to run in the district.

General election

Washington-5 general election, 2022
Party	Candidate	Votes	%
Democratic	Ela Chapin	2,012	97.3
Write-in	Write-ins	55	2.7
Total votes		2,067	100.0
Democratic hold			

=== Washington-6 ===
- Elects one representative.

Democratic primary

Washington-6 Democratic primary, 2022
Party	Candidate	Votes	%
Democratic	Marc Mihaly	637	56.4
Democratic	Bram Towbin	488	43.2
Democratic	Write-ins	5	0.4
Total votes		1,130	100.0

Republican primary

Washington-6 Republican primary, 2022
Party	Candidate	Votes	%
Republican	Tina Golon	151	93.8
Republican	Write-ins	10	6.2
Total votes		161	100.0

General election

Washington-6 general election, 2022
Party	Candidate	Votes	%
Democratic	Marc Mihaly	1,549	68.0
Republican	Tina Golon	704	30.9
Write-in	Write-ins	25	1.1
Total votes		2,278	100.0
Democratic hold			

=== Washington-Chittenden ===
- Elects two representatives.

Democratic primary

Washington-Chittenden Democratic primary, 2022
Party	Candidate	Votes	%
Democratic	Theresa Wood (incumbent)	1,768	52.7
Democratic	Tom Stevens (incumbent)	1,570	46.8
Democratic	Write-ins	19	0.6
Total votes		3,357	100.0

Republican primary

Washington-Chittenden Republican primary, 2022
Party	Candidate	Votes	%
Republican	Kathi Tarrant	274	95.8
Republican	Write-ins	12	4.2
Total votes		286	100.0

General election

Washington-Chittenden general election, 2022
Party	Candidate	Votes	%
Democratic	Theresa Wood (incumbent)	3,364	41.9
Democratic	Tom Stevens (incumbent)	3,012	37.6
Republican	Kathi Tarrant	1,048	13.1
Independent	William McGorry	593	7.4
Write-in	Write-ins	4	0.0
Total votes		8,017	100.0
Democratic hold			
Democratic hold			

=== Washington-Orange ===
- Elects two representatives.

Republican primary

Washington-Orange Republican primary, 2022
Party	Candidate	Votes	%
Republican	Topper McFaun (incumbent)	572	51.1
Republican	Gina Galfetti	528	47.2
Republican	Write-ins	19	1.7
Total votes		1,119	100.0

Democratic primary

Washington-Orange Democratic primary, 2022
Party	Candidate	Votes	%
Democratic	Melissa Battah	822	83.4
Republican	Topper McFaun (incumbent) (write-in)	77	7.8
Democratic	Write-ins	87	8.8
Total votes		986	100.0

General election

Washington-Orange general election, 2022
Party	Candidate	Votes	%
Republican/Democratic	Topper McFaun (incumbent)	2,385	37.6
Republican	Gina Galfetti	2,287	36.0
Democratic	Melissa Battah	1,645	25.9
Write-in	Write-ins	28	0.4
Total votes		6,345	100.0
Republican hold			
Republican hold			

=== Windham-1 ===
- Elects one representative.

Democratic primary

<

Windham-1 Democratic primary, 2022
Party	Candidate	Votes	%
Democratic	Sara Coffey (incumbent)	652	99.5
Democratic	Write-ins	3	0.5
Total votes		657	100.0

Republican primary

Windham-1 Republican primary, 2022
Party	Candidate	Votes	%
Republican	Nancy Gassett	169	95.5
Republican	Write-ins	8	4.5
Total votes		177	100.0

General election

Windham-1 general election, 2022
Party	Candidate	Votes	%
Democratic	Sara Coffey (incumbent)	1,335	65.8
Republican	Nancy Gassett	690	34.0
Write-in	Write-ins	3	0.1
Total votes		2,028	100.0
Democratic hold			

=== Windham-2 ===
- Elects one representative.
- No major party candidate filed for the seat.

General election

Windham-2 general election, 2022
Party	Candidate	Votes	%
Independent	Laura Sibilia (incumbent)	1,068	70.0
Independent	George Wilson	454	29.8
Write-in	Write-ins	3	0.2
Total votes		1,525	100.0
Independent hold			

=== Windham-3 ===
- Elects two representatives.

Democratic primary

Windham-3 Democratic primary, 2022
Party	Candidate	Votes	%
Democratic	Michelle Bos-Lun (incumbent)	1,043	50.9
Democratic	Leslie Goldman (incumbent)	996	48.6
Democratic	Write-ins	11	0.5
Total votes		2,050	100.0

Republican primary

Windham-3 Republican primary, 2022
Party	Candidate	Votes	%
Republican	Tyler Austin	169	54.3
Republican	Bonnie Depino	129	41.5
Republican	Write-ins	13	4.2
Total votes		311	100.0

General election

Windham-3 general election, 2022
Party	Candidate	Votes	%
Democratic	Leslie Goldman (incumbent)	2,300	36.4
Democratic	Michelle Bos-Lun (incumbent)	2,139	33.9
Republican	Tyler Austin	831	13.2
Republican	Bonnie Depino	683	10.8
Independent	Ryan Coyne	346	5.5
Write-in	Write-ins	12	0.2
Total votes		6,311	100.0
Democratic hold			
Democratic hold			

=== Windham-4 ===
- Elects one representative.

Democratic primary

Windham-4 Democratic primary, 2022
Party	Candidate	Votes	%
Democratic	Mike Mrowicki (incumbent)	1,060	99.3
Democratic	Write-ins	7	0.7
Total votes		1,067	100.0

Republican primary

Windham-4 Republican primary, 2022
Party	Candidate	Votes	%
Republican	Lynn Kuralt	103	99.0
Republican	Write-ins	1	1.0
Total votes		104	100.0

General election

Windham-4 general election, 2022
Party	Candidate	Votes	%
Democratic	Mike Mrowicki (incumbent)	1,761	79.6
Republican	Lynn Kuralt	450	20.3
Write-in	Write-ins	2	0.1
Total votes		2,213	100.0
Democratic hold			

=== Windham-5 ===
- Elects one representative.

Democratic primary

Windham-5 Democratic primary, 2022
Party	Candidate	Votes	%
Democratic	Emily Long (incumbent)	772	99.0
Democratic	Write-ins	8	1.0
Total votes		780	100.0

- No other candidates filed for the seat.

General election

Windham-5 general election, 2022
Party	Candidate	Votes	%
Democratic	Emily Long (incumbent)	1,634	97.0
Write-in	Write-ins	51	3.0
Total votes		1,685	100.0
Democratic hold			

=== Windham-6 ===
- Elects one representative.

Democratic primary

Windham-6 Democratic primary, 2022
Party	Candidate	Votes	%
Democratic	Tristan Roberts	471	98.3
Democratic	Write-ins	8	1.7
Total votes		479	100.0

Republican primary

Windham-6 Republican primary, 2022
Party	Candidate	Votes	%
Republican	John Lyddy	201	94.8
Republican	Write-ins	11	5.2
Total votes		212	100.0

General election

Windham-6 general election, 2022
Party	Candidate	Votes	%
Democratic	Tristan Roberts	1,203	64.4
Republican	John Lyddy	658	35.2
Write-in	Write-ins	8	0.4
Total votes		1,869	100.0
Democratic hold			

=== Windham-7 ===
- Elects one representative.

Democratic primary

Windham-7 Democratic primary, 2022
Party	Candidate	Votes	%
Democratic	Emilie Kornheiser (incumbent)	670	100.0
Total votes		670	100.0

Republican primary

Windham-7 Republican primary, 2022
Party	Candidate	Votes	%
Republican	Terry Martin (write-in)	2	18.2
Republican	Other write-ins	9	81.8
Total votes		11	100.0

General election

Windham-7 general election, 2022
Party	Candidate	Votes	%
Democratic	Emilie Kornheiser (incumbent)	1,211	73.6
Republican	Terry Martin	433	26.3
Write-in	Write-ins	1	0.1
Total votes		1,645	100.0
Democratic hold			

=== Windham-8 ===
- Elects one representative.

Democratic primary

Windham-8 Democratic primary, 2022
Party	Candidate	Votes	%
Democratic	Mollie Burke (incumbent)	816	100.0
Total votes		816	100.0

Republican primary

Windham-8 Republican primary, 2022
Party	Candidate	Votes	%
Republican	Rikki Risatti (write-in)	1	10.0
Republican	Other write-ins	9	90.0
Total votes		10	100.0

General election

Windham-8 general election, 2022
Party	Candidate	Votes	%
Democratic	Mollie Burke (incumbent)	1,447	89.6
Republican	Rikki Risatti	164	10.2
Write-in	Write-ins	4	0.2
Total votes		1,615	100.0
Democratic gain from Progressive			

=== Windham-9 ===
- Elects one representative.

Democratic primary

Windham-9 Democratic primary, 2022
Party	Candidate	Votes	%
Democratic	Tristan Toleno (incumbent)	838	100.0
Total votes		838	100.0

- No other candidates filed for the seat.

General election

Windham-9 general election, 2022
Party	Candidate	Votes	%
Democratic	Tristan Toleno (incumbent)	1,543	98.0
Write-in	Write-ins	31	2.0
Total votes		1,574	100.0
Democratic hold			

=== Windham-Windsor-Bennington ===
- Elects one representative.
- No major party candidate filed for the seat.

General election

Windham-Windsor-Bennington general election, 2022
Party	Candidate	Votes	%
Independent	Kelly Pajala (incumbent)	1,746	98.3
Write-in	Write-ins	30	1.7
Total votes		1,776	100.0
Independent hold			

=== Windsor-1 ===
- Elects two representatives.

Democratic primary

Windsor-1 Democratic primary, 2022
Party	Candidate	Votes	%
Democratic	John Bartholomew (incumbent)	918	37.7
Democratic	Elizabeth Burrows (incumbent)	917	37.7
Democratic	Paul Belaski	599	24.6
Total votes		2,434	100.0

- No other candidates filed in the district.

General election

Windsor-1 general election, 2022
Party	Candidate	Votes	%
Democratic	John Bartholomew (incumbent)	2,767	50.4
Democratic	Elizabeth Burrows (incumbent)	2,521	45.9
Write-in	Write-ins	200	3.6
Total votes		5,488	100.0
Democratic hold			
Democratic hold			

=== Windsor-2 ===
- Elects one representative.

Democratic primary

Windsor-2 Democratic primary, 2022
Party	Candidate	Votes	%
Democratic	John Arrison (incumbent)	474	98.8
Democratic	Write-ins	6	1.2
Total votes		480	100.0

General election

Windsor-2 general election, 2022
Party	Candidate	Votes	%
Democratic	John Arrison (incumbent)	1,199	56.1
Independent	Stuart Lindberg	924	43.2
Write-in	Write-ins	14	0.7
Total votes		2,137	100.0
Democratic hold			

=== Windsor-3 ===
- Elects one representative.

Democratic primary

Windsor-3 Democratic primary, 2022
Party	Candidate	Votes	%
Democratic	Alice Emmons (incumbent)	805	50.5
Democratic	Kristi Morris (incumbent)	773	48.5
Democratic	Write-ins	15	0.9
Total votes		1,593	100.0

Republican primary

Windsor-3 Republican primary, 2022
Party	Candidate	Votes	%
Republican	Judy Stern	371	92.3
Republican	Write-ins	31	7.7
Total votes		402	100.0

General election

Windsor-3 general election, 2022
Party	Candidate	Votes	%
Democratic	Kristi Morris (incumbent)	1,925	36.6
Democratic	Alice Emmons (incumbent)	1,861	35.4
Republican	Judy Stern	1,424	27.1
Write-in	Write-ins	53	1.0
Total votes		5,263	100.0
Democratic hold			
Democratic hold			

=== Windsor-4 ===
- Elects one representative.

Democratic primary

Windham-8 Democratic primary, 2022
Party	Candidate	Votes	%
Democratic	Heather Surprenant (incumbent)	712	99.7
Democratic	Write-ins	2	0.3
Total votes		714	100.0

- No other candidates filed for the seat.

General election

Windsor-4 general election, 2022
Party	Candidate	Votes	%
Democratic	Heather Surprenant (incumbent)	1,902	96.4
Write-in	Write-ins	71	3.6
Total votes		1,973	100.0
Democratic gain from Progressive			

=== Windsor-5 ===
- Elects one representative.

Democratic primary

Windsor-5 Democratic primary, 2022
Party	Candidate	Votes	%
Democratic	Tesha Buss	901	99.8
Democratic	Write-ins	2	0.2
Total votes		903	100.0

General election

Windsor-5 general election, 2022
Party	Candidate	Votes	%
Democratic	Tesha Buss	1,648	72.4
Independent	Keith Capellini	619	27.2
Write-in	Write-ins	8	0.4
Total votes		2,275	100.0
Democratic hold			

=== Windsor-6 ===
- Elects two representatives.

Democratic primary

Windsor-6 Democratic primary, 2022
Party	Candidate	Votes	%
Democratic	Esme Cole	992	41.3
Democratic	Kevin "Coach" Christie (incumbent)	959	40.0
Democratic	Nicholas Bramlage	449	18.7
Total votes		2,400	100.0

- No other candidates filed for the seat.

General election

Windsor-6 general election, 2022
Party	Candidate	Votes	%
Democratic	Kevin "Coach" Christie (incumbent)	2,904	49.8
Democratic	Esme Cole	2,801	48.0
Write-in	Write-ins	127	2.2
Total votes		5,832	100.0
Democratic hold			
Democratic hold			

=== Windsor-Addison ===
- Elects one representative.

Democratic primary

Windsor-Addison Democratic primary, 2022
Party	Candidate	Votes	%
Democratic	Kirk White (incumbent)	587	98.8
Write-in	Write-ins	7	1.2
Total votes		594	100.0

- No other candidates filed for the seat.

General election

Windsor-Addison Democratic primary, 2022
Party	Candidate	Votes	%
Democratic	Kirk White (incumbent)	1,548	95.0
Write-in	Write-ins	82	5.0
Total votes		1,630	100.0
Democratic hold			

=== Windsor-Orange-1 ===
- Elects one representative.

Democratic primary

Windsor-Orange-1 Democratic primary, 2022
Party	Candidate	Votes	%
Democratic	John O'Brien (incumbent)	469	97.5
Write-in	Write-ins	12	2.5
Total votes		481	100.0

- No other candidates filed for the seat.

General election

Windsor-Orange-1 general election, 2022
Party	Candidate	Votes	%
Democratic	John O'Brien (incumbent)	1,484	93.3
Write-in	Write-ins	106	6.7
Total votes		1,590	100.0
Democratic hold			

=== Windsor-Orange-2 ===
- Elects two representatives.

Democratic primary

Windsor-Orange-2 Democratic primary, 2022
Party	Candidate	Votes	%
Democratic	Rebecca Holcombe	1,983	42.0
Democratic	Jim Masland (incumbent)	1,662	35.2
Democratic	Dee Gish	1,072	22.7
Total votes		4,717	100.0

Republican primary

Windsor-Orange-2 Republican primary, 2022
Party	Candidate	Votes	%
Republican	Bill Huff	235	72.3
Republican	Matt Stralka (write-in)	77	24.9
Republican	Other write-ins	13	4.2
Total votes		309	100.0

General election

Windsor-Orange-2 general election, 2022
Party	Candidate	Votes	%
Democratic	Rebecca Holcombe	3,921	42.3
Democratic	Jim Masland (incumbent)	3,817	41.2
Republican	Bill Huff	885	9.6
Republican	Matt Stralka	618	6.7
Write-in	Write-ins	21	0.2
Total votes		9,262	100.0
Democratic hold			
Democratic hold			

=== Windsor-Windham ===
- Elects one representative.

Democratic primary

Windsor-Windham Democratic primary, 2022
Party	Candidate	Votes	%
Democratic	Heather Chase	658	98.9
Democratic	Write-ins	7	1.1
Total votes		665	100.0

Republican primary

Windsor-Windham Republican primary, 2022
Party	Candidate	Votes	%
Republican	Eva Ryan	216	95.2
Republican	Write-ins	11	4.8
Total votes		227	100.0

General election

Windsor-Windham general election, 2022
Party	Candidate	Votes	%
Democratic	Heather Chase	1,312	61.8
Republican	Eva Ryan	809	38.1
Write-in	Write-ins	2	0.1
Total votes		2,123	100.0
Democratic hold			

== See also ==
- 2022 Vermont elections
- 2022 United States elections
- 2022 United States House of Representatives election in Vermont
- 2022 Vermont gubernatorial election
