= Robin Scheu =

Robin Scheu may refer to:

- Robin Scheu (footballer)
- Robin Scheu (politician)
