= Carl Demrow =

American politician from Vermont

Carl C Demrow

Member of the Vermont House of Representatives from the Orange 1 district
- In office January 4, 2023 – January 8, 2025
- Preceded by: Samantha Lefebvre
- Succeeded by: Michael Tagliavia
- In office January 9, 2019 – January 6, 2021 Serving with Rodney Graham
- Preceded by: Robert Frenier
- Succeeded by: Samantha Lefebvre

Personal details
- Born: Boston, Massachusetts
- Party: Democratic
- Education: University of Massachusetts Amherst

Carl Demrow is an American politician from Vermont. He served as a Democratic member of the Vermont House of Representatives for the Orange 1 District from 2019 to 2021, and 2023 to 2025. He served as Ranking Member of the Ways and Means Committee from 2023 to 2025. He resides in the town of Corinth, Vermont.
