= Angela Arsenault =

American politician from Vermont

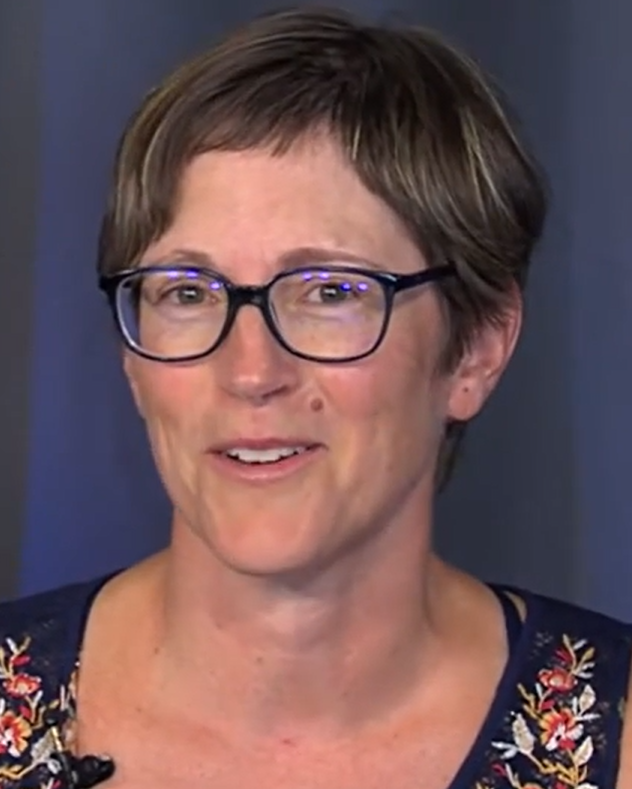
- Arsenault in 2022

Member of the Vermont House of Representatives from the Chittenden-2 district
- Incumbent
- Assumed office January 4, 2023 Serving with Erin Brady

Personal details
- Born: Burlington, Vermont
- Party: Democratic
- Education: University of Massachusetts

Angela Arsenault is an American politician from Vermont. She has been a Democratic member of the Vermont House of Representatives for the Chittenden-2 District since 2023. She was elected in 2022 and re-elected in 2024.

She was elected chair of the Champlain Valley School District board in 2021.
