= LaBounty =

LaBounty is a surname.

== List of people with the surname ==
- Bill LaBounty, American musician
- Dennis LaBounty, American politician from Vermont
- Kelly Blair LaBounty (born 1970), American track and field athlete
- Matt LaBounty (born 1969), American football player

== See also ==
- L.A. Bounty, 1989 film
