= Melanie Carpenter (politician) =

American politician from Vermont

Member of the Vermont House of Representatives from the Lamoille-2 District district
- Incumbent
- Assumed office March 21, 2023
- Preceded by: Kate Donnally

Personal details
- Party: Democratic
- Education: University of Vermont; Johnson State College

Melanie Carpenter is an American Democratic politician who represents the Lamoille-2 District in the Vermont House of Representatives.
