= Stephanie Jerome =

American politician from Vermont

Member of the Vermont House of Representatives from the Rutland-9 District district
- Incumbent
- Assumed office January 4, 2023

Personal details
- Born: Burlington, Vermont
- Party: Democratic
- Education: University of Vermont; University of Massachusetts Amherst

Stephanie Jerome is an American politician from Vermont. She has been a Democratic member of the Vermont House of Representatives for the Rutland-9 District since 2023.

Jerome was born in Burlington and grew up in Mendon.
