= Katarina Lisaius =

American politician

Member-elect of the Vermont House of Representatives from the Washington-Chittenden district
- Assuming office January 2027
- Succeeding: Tom Stevens

Personal details
- Party: Democratic

Katarina Lisaius is an American politician. A member of the Democratic Party, she is the member-elect for the Washington-Chittenden district of the Vermont House of Representatives.
