= Kate Donnally =

American politician

Member of the Vermont House of Representatives from the Lamoille-2 district
- In office January 6, 2021 – January 27, 2023
- Preceded by: Matthew Hill
- Succeeded by: Melanie Carpenter

Personal details
- Born: Vermont, U.S.
- Children: 2
- Education: New York University (MSW)

Kate Donnally is an American politician who served as a member of the Vermont House of Representatives for the Lamoille-2 district. A member of the Democratic Party, and serves with Representative Daniel Noyes. Donnally was elected in November 2020, and assumed office on January 6, 2021. She was re-elected in 2022.

== Early life and education ==
Born and raised in Vermont, Donnally graduated from Burlington High School in 1999. She earned a Master of Social Work from the New York University Silver School of Social Work. Donnally and her wife have two children and live in Hyde Park, Vermont.

== Career ==
Donnally worked at the Ali Forney Center, a community center for LGBT homeless youth in New York City. Outside of politics, she is a licensed social worker and counselor. Donnally was elected to the Vermont House of Representatives in November 2020 and assumed office on January 6, 2021.
