= Elizabeth Allen-Pennebaker =

American politician

Member-elect of the Vermont House of Representatives from the Chittenden-14 district
- Assuming office January 2027
- Succeeding: Barbara Rachelson

Personal details
- Party: Democratic

Elizabeth Allen-Pennebaker is an American politician. A member of the Democratic Party, she is the member-elect for the Chittenden-14 district of the Vermont House of Representatives.
