= John Kascenska =

American politician

Member of the Vermont House of Representatives from the Essex–Caledonia district
- Incumbent
- Assumed office January 8, 2025
- Preceded by: Terri Lynn Williams

Member of the Vermont House of Representatives from the Caledonia-4 district
- In office March 8, 2022 – January 2023 Serving with Martha Feltus
- Preceded by: Patrick Seymour

Personal details
- Party: Republican
- Education: Lyndon State College

John Kascenska is an American Republican politician who represents the Essex–Caledonia district in the Vermont House of Representatives. He previously represented the Caledonia 4 district from March 8, 2022 to 2023. He was appointed by Phil Scott on March 7, 2022. In August 2022, he was defeated in the primary by fellow Republican incumbent Terri Lynn Williams.
