= Michelle Bos-Lun =

American educator, activist, and politician

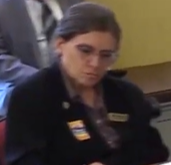
- Bos-Lun in 2024
- In office 2022-2024

Member of the Vermont House of Representatives from the Windham 3 district
- Incumbent
- Assumed office 2021
- Preceded by: Carolyn Partridge

Member of the Vermont House of Representatives from the Windham 4 district
- Preceded by: Nader Hashim

Personal details
- Party: Democratic

Michelle Bos-Lun is an American educator who also works in social services and restorative justice. She has been a politician since being elected in 2020. She is a state representative initially elected to Windham-4 for her first term, but after redistricting, now serving Windham-3 district of Vermont.

== Career ==
Bos-Lun moved to Vermont in 2003 to attend graduate school at the School for International Training Graduate Institute. Since that time she has worked in both education and social services. She has worked for many years developing, leading and supervising service learning programs: both bringing students from countries like Iraq and Belarus to meet and learn with young Americans, and also bringing Americans abroad to places including India, Nepal and Morocco. For five years, she worked at Youth Services in the area of youth housing and career development. She has designed, taught and supervised programs for the Governor's Institute of Vermont for many years. Prior to election to the Vermont General Assembly Bos-Lun taught social studies and language arts at a secondary school level for seven years. She has taught English and US and World History online for many years as well. The final year before her election Bos-Lun worked at the Brattleboro Community Justice Center in restorative justice, supporting reentry for people recently released from incarceration. In 2023 after the legislature adjourned, Bos-Lun served as an interim case manager at Groundworks, supporting individuals who lacked permanent housing. Bos-Lun is co- founder and co-director of Bihar Educational Change Foundation, a nonprofit organization which supports educational and nutritional programs at three schools in Bihar, India. Bos-Lun also serves on the Board of Greater Falls Connections, a youth prevention organization based in Bellows Falls, Vermont.

== State House of Representatives campaign ==
In May 2020, Bos-Lun attended Emerge VT, a program that trains Democratic women to run for office in Vermont. On May 13, 2020, Bos-Lun declared her candidacy for the state House of Representatives seat vacated in the two-seat Windham-4 district by outgoing representative Nader Hashim. On July 11, outgoing state representative Nader Hashim endorsed Bos-Lun and incumbent state representative Mike Mrowicki. On August 11, Bos-Lun came in second in the Democratic primary, which was enough to win the Democratic nomination in the two-seat district. She beat Matt Ingram, Robert DePino, and David Ramos. The other Democratic nominee was Mike Mrowicki. On November 3, Bos-Lun and Mrowicki won the general election with no on-ballot opposition. After redistricting in 2022, Bos-Lun ran for reelection in Windham-3 including the towns of Westminster, Rockingham, Brookline.

== Tenure ==
=== Committee assignments ===
First two terms: House Corrections and Institutions: addressing policy for the VT Department of Corrections and for infrastructure spending for the Capital budget including housing projects, court house upgrades, state park infrastructure and more.

Third term: joined the Agriculture, Food Resiliency & Forestry Committee working on Farms, food security, working lands and sustainable forestry. She hopes to continue on the Agriculture Committee in the 2027 session.

=== Caucus memberships ===
Democratic caucus

Climate Solutions Caucus

Women's caucus

Public health caucus

=== Policy positions ===
Rep. Bos-Lun has introduced legislation and supported policy changes in varied areas. Bos-Lun has been a lead sponsor of bills addressing housing, justice reform, mental health services & trapping. She has introduced two bills with VT students: one addressing anti-racism, and the other designating a Vermont State Mushroom. She has co-sponsored 63 bills in the 2023-2024 session focusing on child care, housing, climate, youth issues, and restorative justice.

== Electoral history ==
Vermont State House of Representatives Windham-4 Primary Election, 2020
Party	Candidate	Votes	%
Democratic	Mike Mrowicki	1,633	45.99
Democratic	Michelle Bos-Lun	1,515	42.66
Democratic	Matt Ingram	197	5.54
Democratic	David Ramos	135	3.80
Democratic	Robert DePino	71	1.66
Total votes		3,551	100

Vermont State House of Representatives Windham-4 General Election, 2020
Party	Candidate	Votes	%
Democratic	Mike Mrowicki	3,357	50.74
Democratic	Michelle Bos-Lun	3,259	49.26
Total votes		6,616	100

Vermont State House of Representatives Windham-3 General Election, 2022
Party	Candidate	Votes	%
Democratic	Leslie Goldman	2,300	35.6%
Democratic	Michelle Bos-Lun	2,139	34.0%
Republican	Tyler Austin	831	13.2%
Republican	Bonnie DePino	683	10.8%
Independent	Ryan Coyne	346	5.5%
Total votes		6,299	100%
