= Adam Franz (politician) =

American politician

Member-elect of the Vermont House of Representatives from the Chittenden-14 district
- Assuming office January 2027
- Succeeding: Mary-Katherine Stone

Personal details
- Party: Democratic; Progressive

Adam Franz is an American politician. A member of the Democratic Party and the Progressive Party, he is the member-elect for the Chittenden-14 district of the Vermont House of Representatives.
