= Samantha Lefebvre =

American politician

Samantha Lefebvre is an American politician. She served the Orange-1 district in the Vermont House of Representatives. In the 2022 Vermont House of Representatives election she was succeeded by Carl Demrow.

A Republican, she served on the House Committee on Government Operations and Government Accountability Committee.

== Biography ==
She graduated from Mount Mansfield Union High School and the Center for Technology.
