= Mary Sullivan (politician) =

American politician and member of the Vermont State House of Representatives

Member of the Vermont House of Representatives from the Chittenden 6-5 district
- In office 2014–2020
- Succeeded by: Tiff Bluemle

Personal details
- Born: Marlborough, MA
- Party: Democratic
- Education: Trinity College of Vermont (BA) Boston University (MS, Journalism)

Mary Sullivan is an American politician who served in the Vermont House of Representatives from 2014 to 2020.
