= Gabrielle Stebbins =

American politician from Vermont

Member of the Vermont House of Representatives from the Chittenden-13 district
- In office January 4, 2023 – January 8, 2025 Serving with Tiffany Bluemle
- Succeeded by: Bram Kleppner

Personal details
- Born: Newton, Massachusetts
- Party: Democratic
- Education: Nelson Mandela University; Rice University

Gabrielle Stebbins is an American politician from Vermont. She was a Democratic member of the Vermont House of Representatives for the Chittenden-13 District from 2023 to 2025.
