= Theresa Wood =

American politician from Vermont

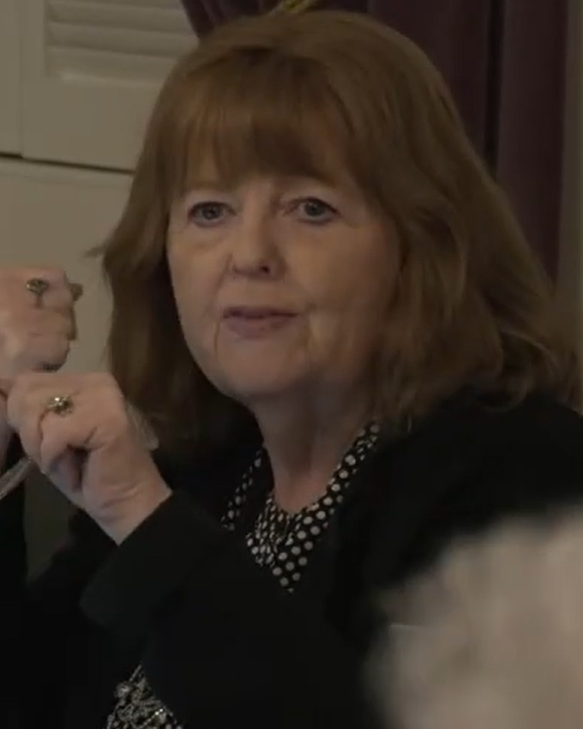
- Wood in 2026

Member of the Vermont House of Representatives from the Washington-Chittenden District district
- Incumbent
- Assumed office 2015 Serving with Tom Stevens

Personal details
- Party: Democratic

Theresa Wood is an American politician from Vermont. She has been a Democratic member of the Vermont House of Representatives for the Washington-Chittenden District since 2015.
