= Terri Lynn Williams =

American politician

Terri Lynn Williams (born November 1956) is an American Republican politician who has represented Essex-Caledonia in the Vermont House of Representatives since 2020.

In 2022, she defeated fellow Republican incumbent John Kascenska in the primary. She contested the 2022 general election unopposed.
