= Mary-Katherine Stone =

American politician from Vermont

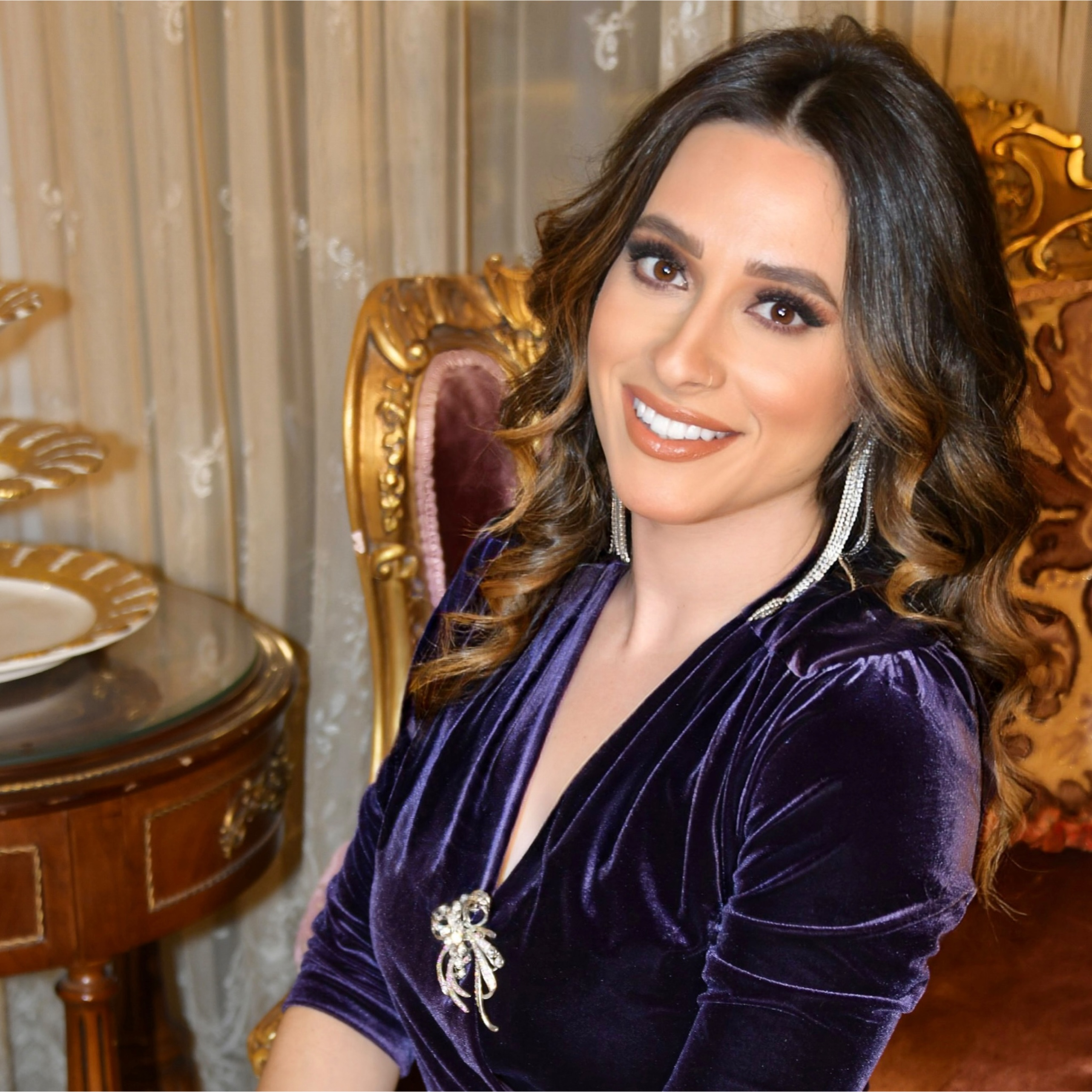

Member of the Vermont House of Representatives from the Chittenden-14 district
- Incumbent
- Assumed office January 4, 2023
- Preceded by: Constituency established
- Succeeded by: Adam Franz (elect)

Personal details
- Born: Alabama, USA
- Party: Democratic
- Education: University of Alabama

Mary-Katherine Stone is an American politician from Vermont. She has been a Democratic member of the Vermont House of Representatives for the Chittenden-14 District since 2023.

== Personal life ==
Stone is the daughter of an Egyptian immigrant father and an Alabamian mother.
