= Karen Dolan =

American politician

Member of the Vermont House of Representatives from the Chittenden-8-2 district
- Incumbent
- Assumed office January 6, 2021
- Preceded by: Dylan Giambatista

Personal details
- Party: Democratic
- Children: 2
- Education: University of Vermont (BA)

Karen Dolan is an American politician serving as a member of the Vermont House of Representatives for the Chittenden-8-2 district. Elected in November 2020, she assumed office on January 6, 2021.

== Early life and education ==
A native of Vermont, Dolan was raised in the Northeast Kingdom region. She earned a bachelor's degree from the University of Vermont.

== Career ==
Prior to entering politics, Dolan worked as a restorative justice specialist for the Essex Community Justice Center. She was elected to the Vermont House of Representatives in November 2020 and assumed office on January 6, 2021.
