= Tiffany Bluemle =

American politician

Member of the Vermont House of Representatives from the Chittenden 6-5 district
- Incumbent
- Assumed office January 6, 2021 Serving with Gabrielle Stebbins
- Preceded by: Mary Sullivan and Joey Donovan

Personal details
- Party: Democratic
- Children: 2
- Education: Princeton University (BA); Harvard Kennedy School (MPA)

Tiffany (Tiff) Bluemle is an American politician and a member of the Democratic Party who has served in the Vermont House of Representatives since 2021.

Bluemle serves on the House Committee on General, Housing, and Military Affairs and as the Chair of the House Sexual Harassment Prevention Panel.
