= Barbara Rachelson =

American politician and member of the Vermont State House of Representatives

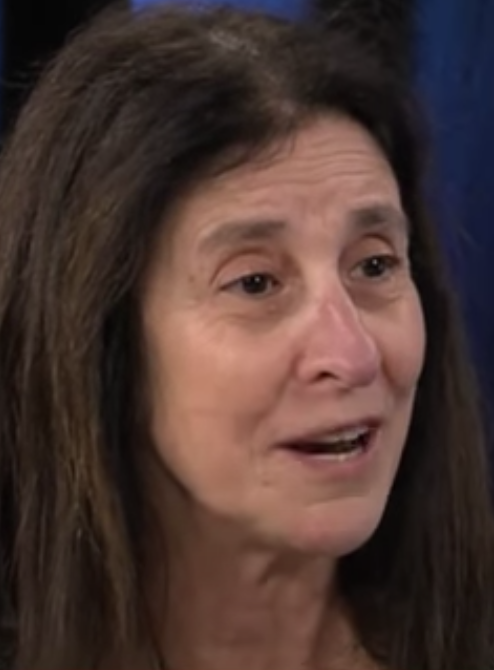
- Portrait of Barbara

Member of the Vermont House of Representatives from the Chittenden 14 district
- Incumbent
- Assumed office 2013
- Succeeded by: Elizabeth Allen-Pennebaker (elect)

Personal details
- Born: Glen Ridge, New Jersey, U.S.
- Party: Democratic
- Education: Brandeis University (BA); University of Michigan (MSW)

Barbara Rachelson is an American politician who has served in the Vermont House of Representatives since 2013.

Rachelson was born in Glen Ridge, New Jersey. Raised in North Caldwell, New Jersey, she graduated from West Essex High School. She earned an undergraduate degree from Brandeis University and a graduate degree from the University of Michigan. She is a nonreligious Jew.
