= Anne Donahue =

American politician (born 1956)

Member of the Vermont House of Representatives from the Washington-1 district Washington-2 (2003–2013)
- In office January 2003 – December 2026

Personal details
- Born: March 20, 1956 (age 70) Burlington, Vermont, U.S.
- Party: Republican (before 2024); Independent (2024–present)
- Education: Boston College (BA); Georgetown University (JD)
- Website: http://annedonahue.blogspot.com

Anne de la Blanchetai Donahue is an American politician from the state of Vermont. She has served as a member of the Vermont House of Representatives since 2003, representing the Washington-1 district, which includes the Washington County towns of Berlin and Northfield. Donahue represented Washington-2 until 2013, when she was redistricted. She was also editor of Counterpoint, a quarterly mental health publication distributed for free throughout Vermont, until retiring in 2023.

== Education and early career ==
Anne Donahue was born on March 20, 1956, in Burlington, Vermont. She attended the Cours de Civilisation Française de la Sorbonne in Paris in 1976. Donahue earned a bachelor's degree in political science and philosophy from Boston College in 1978, and received a Juris Doctor degree at Georgetown University Law Center in 1981.

Starting in 1981, Donahue worked as a program director for the New York City location of Covenant House, the largest privately funded childcare agency in the United States providing shelter and service to homeless and runaway youths. She served as senior staff attorney for the New York location until 1986 and stayed on to develop a street outreach program until 1988, when she left to become the founding executive director of the Covenant Center location in Los Angeles. Donahue served as the California location's executive director until 1990. That year, she received the Jefferson Lifetime Achievement Award for Greatest Public Service by an Individual 35 Years or Younger.

In 1990, Donahue moved to Northfield, Vermont, where her family has roots going back five generations. From 1991 to 1996, Donahue worked as a junior high school teacher in Winooski, Vermont. In 1998, she became editor of Counterpoint, a quarterly mental health publication published by Vermont Psychiatric Survivors, Inc., which is distributed free throughout Vermont and has a circulation of about 7,000. Donahue retired from that position in 2023.

Donahue has served on a number of non-legislative committees, including the Act 129 Parity Committee (2000–2004); the State Standing Committee for Adult Mental Health (2000–2004); the Fletcher Allen Health Care (later renamed the University of Vermont Medical Center) Psychiatric Program Quality Committee (2001–2026); the State Hospital Futures Committee (2004); and the Corrections Stakeholder Mental Health Committee (2004). She has also served on the U.S. Secretary of Health and Human Services Advisory Committee on Human Research Protections' Subcommittee on Inclusion of Individuals with Impaired Decision-making in Research (SIIIDR), and has been a member of Rotary International since 2003.

== Vermont House ==
Anne Donahue, a Republican, has been serving as a representative on the Vermont House of Representatives since 2003. She represents the Washington-1 district, which includes the Washington County towns of Northfield, and Berlin. Donahue served on the Mental Health Oversight Committee (2003-2006), as has been described in the Rutland Herald as "one of the Legislature's strongest mental health advocates". Donahue has served as the ranking member of the House Human Services Committee and as Vice-Chair of the House Health Care Committee, as well as on the House Rules Committee.

On April 2, 2009, Donahue was one of five Vermont House Republicans who voted in favor of a bill allowing same-sex marriages in the state; the bill passed with an overall vote of 95–52. Donahue was instrumental in amending the bill to clarify a distinction between civil and religious marriage. The Log Cabin Republicans, a gay and lesbian political organization, awarded their annual Uncommon Courage Award in April 2009 to Donahue and seven other Vermont Republican lawmakers for their votes in favor of gay marriage.

Donahue ran for and won re-election in 2024 as an independent.

== Personal life ==
Donahue is Roman Catholic, and is a member, lector and extraordinary minister of Holy Communion at the St. John the Evangelist RC Church in Northfield. Her favorite movies are Life is Beautiful and Romero, and her favorite books are The Yearling by Marjorie Kinnan Rawlings, Little Men by Louisa May Alcott and To Kill a Mockingbird by Harper Lee.
