= Trevor Squirrell =

American politician and member of the Vermont State House of Representatives

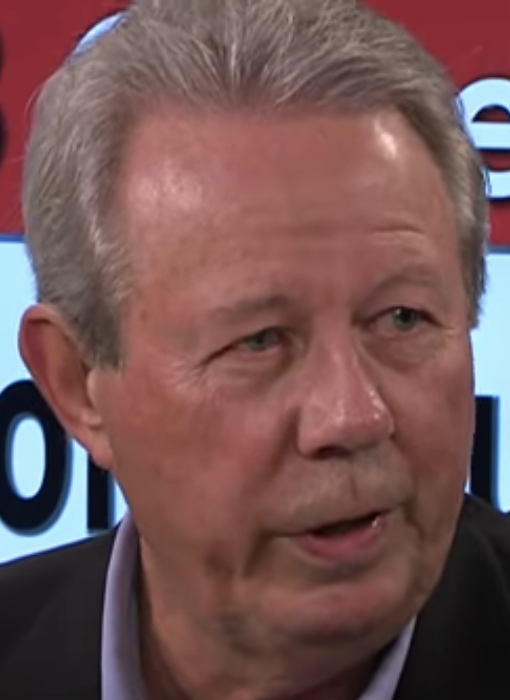
- Squirrell in 2018

Member of the Vermont House of Representatives from the Chittenden-3 District
- Incumbent
- Assumed office 2017

Personal details
- Born: Ipswich, England
- Party: Democratic
- Education: State University of New York at Oswego (BS, Experimental Psychology) Green Mountain College (MS in Environmental Studies)

Trevor Squirrell is an American politician who has served in the Vermont House of Representatives since 2017.
