= Marcia Martel =

American politician and member of the Vermont State House of Representatives

Member of the Vermont House of Representatives from the Caledonia-1 district
- In office January 7, 2015 – January 2023
- Succeeded by: Bobby Farlice-Rubio

Personal details
- Born: Concord, Vermont, U.S.
- Party: Republican
- Children: 2

Marcia Robinson Martel is an American politician who has served in the Vermont House of Representatives from 2015 to 2023.
