= Mike McCarthy (Vermont politician) =

American politician and member of the Vermont State House of Representatives

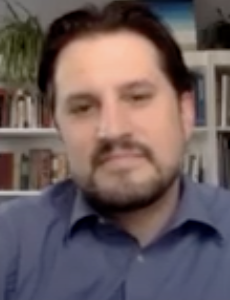
- McCarthy in 2021

Member of the Vermont House of Representatives from the Franklin 3-1
- In office 2012 – January 8, 2025
- Succeeded by: Joe Luneau

Personal details
- Born: Lewes, Delaware, U.S.
- Party: Democratic
- Children: 1 Mike McCarthy's voice McCarthy opens a meeting of the committee of Government operations and military affairs, which he chairs Recorded February 27, 2024
- Education: St. Michael’s College (BA)

Mike McCarthy is an American politician who served in the Vermont House of Representatives from 2012 to 2025.
