= Tom Burditt =

American politician (born 1956)

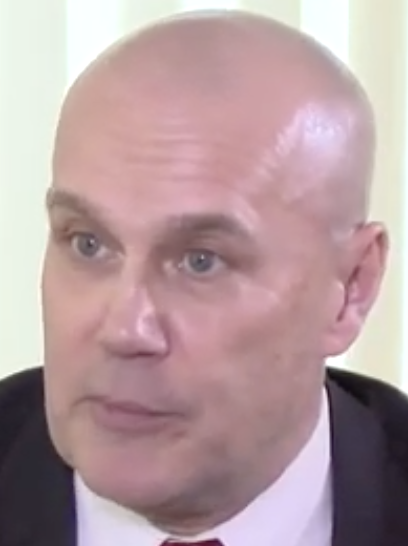
Burditt in 2017

Tom Burditt (born August 18, 1956) is an American politician and a Republican member of the Vermont House of Representatives representing District 2 of Rutland County. He is a former selectmen for the town of West Rutland.
