= Tristan Toleno =

American politician, chef, and businessman

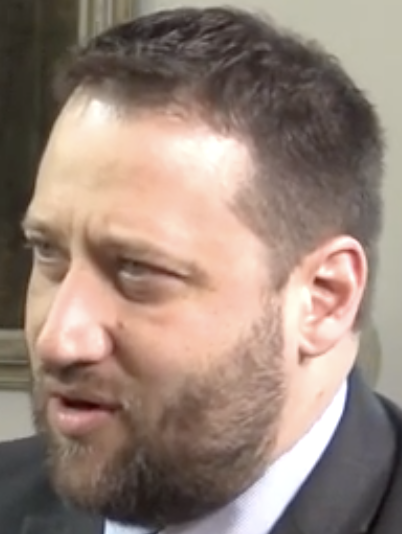
- Toleno in 2017

Member of the Vermont House of Representatives from the Windham-2-3 district
- Incumbent
- Assumed office 2012
- Succeeded by: Ian Goodnow (elect)

Personal details
- Party: Democratic
- Spouse: Susie
- Children: 2
- Education: Wesleyan University (BA); New England Culinary Institute (AA); Marlboro College (MBA)

Tristan Toleno is an American politician, chef, and businessman serving as a member of the Vermont House of Representatives from the Windham-2-3 district.

== Early life and education ==
A native of Marlboro, Vermont, Toleno graduated from Brattleboro Union High School. After earning a Bachelor of Arts degree in philosophy and religious studies at Wesleyan University, Toleno earned an Associate's degree in culinary arts from the New England Culinary Institute and decided to pursue a culinary career.

== Career ==
After graduating from culinary school, Toleno moved to New York City and worked as a chef. Toleno and his wife, Susie, eventually returned to Marlboro, where Toleno earned his Master of Business Administration from Marlboro College and began managing restaurants. Toleno later established two catering companies. Toleno was elected to the Vermont House of Representatives in 2012. He also serves as Assistant Majority Leader of the House.

Toleno has also worked as a professor of management at Marlboro College. He served as the interim director of the Marlboro College Graduate School.
