= Nelson Brownell =

American politician from Vermont

Nelson Brownell is an American politician from Vermont. He has been a Democratic member of the Vermont House of Representatives for the Bennington-1 District since 2019.

Brownell is not running for re-election in 2024.

Vermont House of Representatives
Preceded by Bill Botzow	Member of the Vermont House of Representatives from the Bennington 1st district 2019–2025	Succeeded by Jonathan Cooper
