= Bobby Farlice-Rubio =

American politician from Vermont

Member of the Vermont House of Representatives from the Caledonia-1 district
- In office January 4, 2023 – January 8, 2025
- Preceded by: Marcia Martel
- Succeeded by: Debra Powers

Personal details
- Born: San Francisco, California, U.S.
- Party: Democratic

Bobby Farlice-Rubio is an American politician from Vermont. He was a Democratic member of the Vermont House of Representatives for the Caledonia-1 District from 2023 to 2025. He was born in the Mission District of San Francisco.
