= Dennis LaBounty =

American politician from Vermont

Member of the Vermont House of Representatives from the Caledonia-3 District district
- Incumbent
- Assumed office January 4, 2023 Serving with Charles Wilson

Personal details
- Born: Newport, Vermont
- Party: Democratic

Dennis LaBounty is an American politician from Vermont. He has been a Democratic member of the Vermont House of Representatives for the Caledonia-3 District since 2023.
