= Joseph Parsons (Vermont politician) =

American politician from Vermont

Member of the Vermont House of Representatives from the Orange-Caledonia District district
- Incumbent
- Assumed office January 6, 2021

Personal details
- Party: Republican

Joseph Parsons is an American politician from Vermont. He has been a Republican member of the Vermont House of Representatives for the Orange-Caledonia District since 2021.
