= Sarita Austin =

American politician

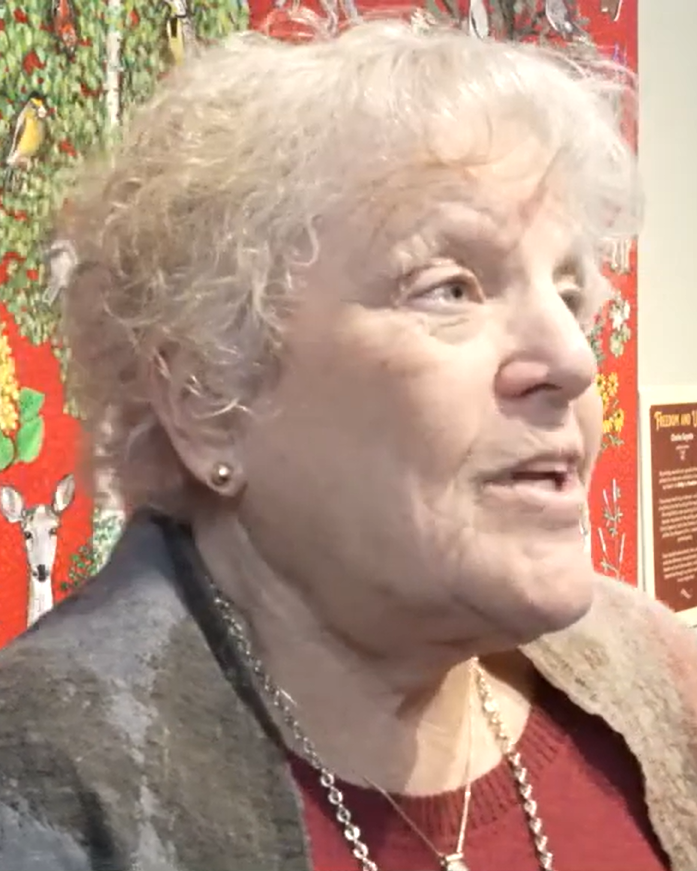
- Austin in 2025

Member of the Vermont House of Representatives from the Chittenden-9-2 district
- Incumbent
- Assumed office 2019

Personal details
- Born: Boston, Massachusetts, U.S.
- Party: Democratic

Sarah "Sarita" Austin is an American Democratic politician who represents Chittenden-9-2 in the Vermont House of Representatives. Austin ran as the incumbent for the seat in 2020.
