= Charles Wilson (Vermont politician) =

American politician

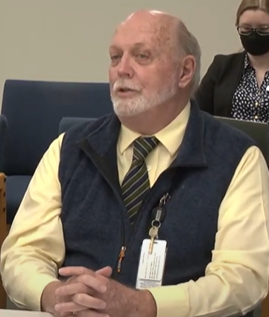
- Wilson in 2024

Member of the Vermont House of Representatives from the Caledonia-3 district
- In office 2023 – March 2024
- Succeeded by: Beth Quimby

Personal details
- Party: Republican
- Charles Wilson's voice Charles Wilson introducing himself in a meeting of the House Agricultural committee Recorded February 21, 2024

Charles Wilson is an American politician from Vermont. He was a Republican member of the Vermont House of Representatives for the Caledonia 3 District from 2023 until his resignation due to ill health on 2 March 2024.

Wilson was born in Allentown, Pennsylvania.
