= Daniel Noyes =

American politician and member of the Vermont State House of Representatives

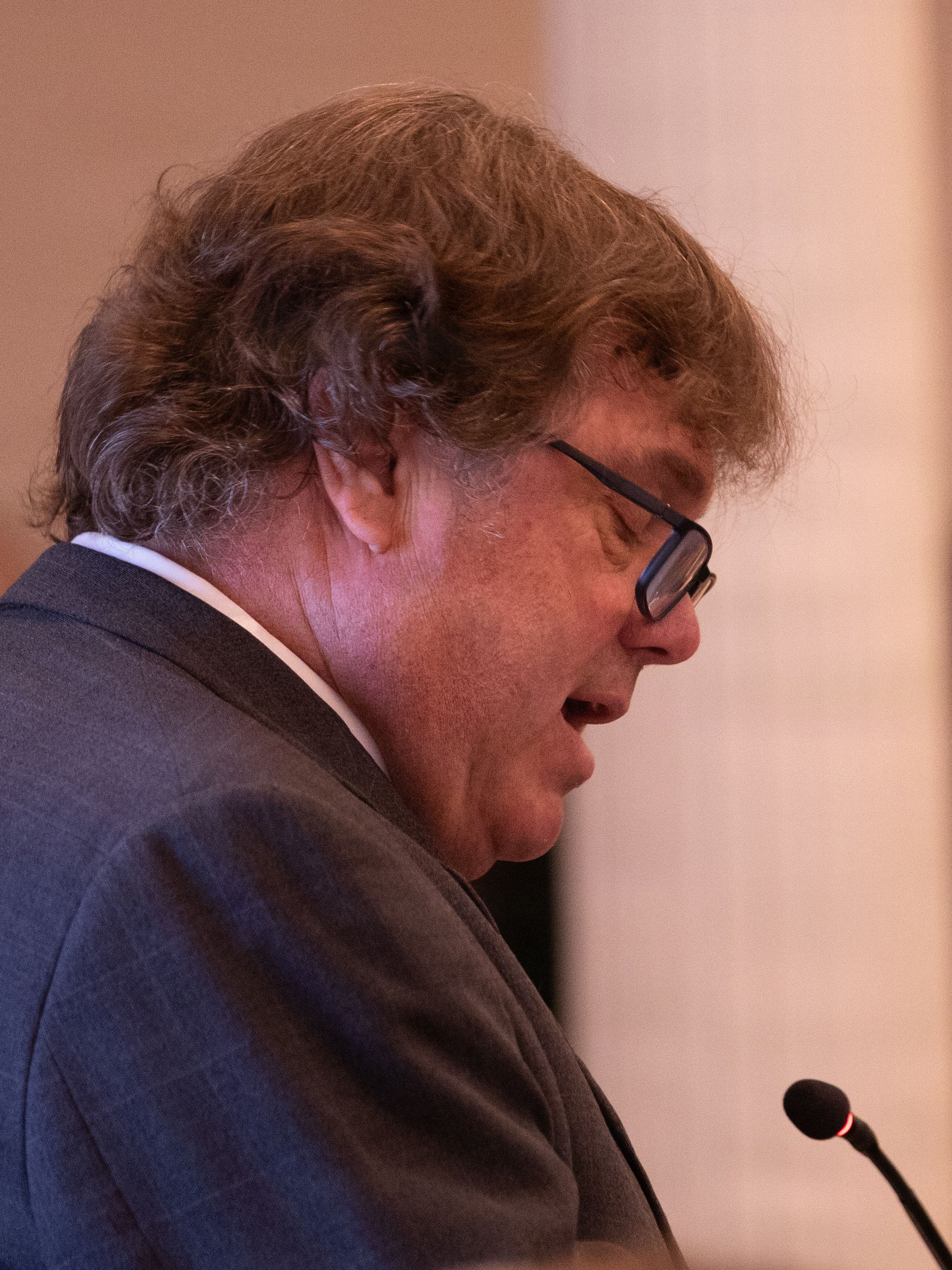
- Noyes speaking in 2026

Member of the Vermont House of Representatives from the Lamoille-2 District
- Incumbent
- Assumed office 2017

Personal details
- Born: Johnson, Vermont, U.S.
- Party: Democratic
- Education: Johnson State College (BA) Marlboro College Certified, Nonprofit Management

Daniel Noyes is an American politician who has served in the Vermont House of Representatives since 2017.
