= Robin Scheu (politician) =

American politician and member of the Vermont State House of Representatives

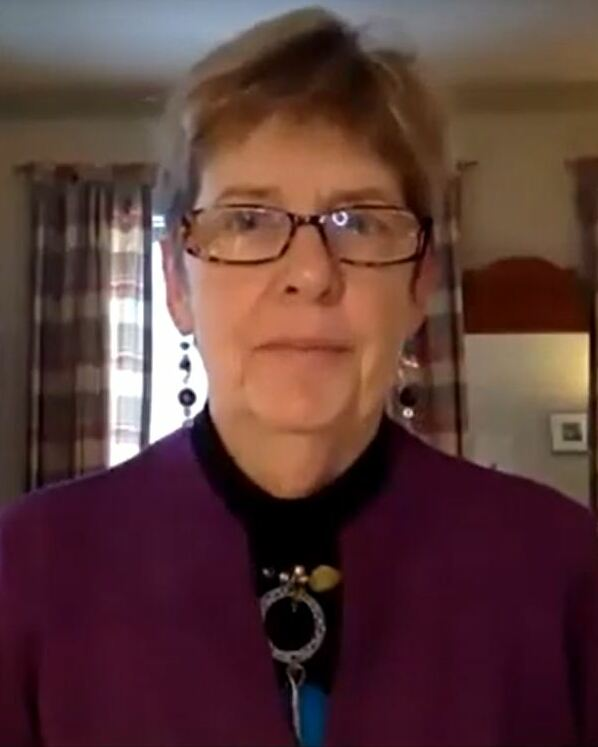
- Scheu in 2021

Member of the Vermont House of Representatives from the Addison-1 district
- Incumbent
- Assumed office 2017

Personal details
- Born: Simsbury, Connecticut, U.S.
- Party: Democratic
- Children: 2
- Education: Smith College (BA) Antioch University New England (MS)

Robin Poole Scheu is an American politician who has served in the Vermont House of Representatives since 2017.
