= Rodney Graham (politician) =

American politician and member of the Vermont State House of Representatives

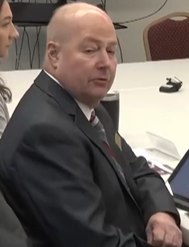
- Graham in 2024

Member of the Vermont House of Representatives
- In office 2014 – January 8, 2025
- Succeeded by: Joshua Dobrovich
- Constituency: Orange-1 District (2014-2022); Orange-3 District (2022-2025)

Personal details
- Born: Williamstown, Vermont, U.S.
- Party: Republican

Rodney Graham is an American politician who served in the Vermont House of Representatives from 2014 to 2025.

== Career ==
He is a dairy farmer and producer of maple sugar. He is a member of the Vermont Farm Bureau, the Vermont Sugar Makers Association, Agri-Mark/Cabot Coop, and the Organic Valley Coop.
