= Erin Brady (politician) =

American politician

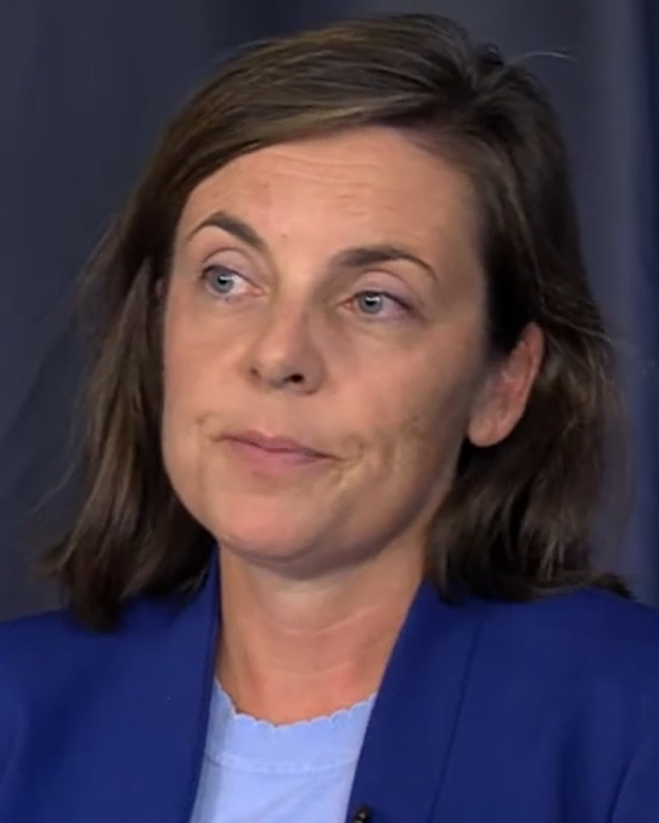
- Brady in 2022

Member of the Vermont House of Representatives from the Chittenden-2 district
- Incumbent
- Assumed office January 4, 2021

Personal details
- Party: Democratic

Erin Brady is an American politician who has represented Chittenden District 2 in the Vermont House of Representatives since 2021. She graduated from Colorado College and Harvard Graduate School of Education.
