= Tom Stevens (Vermont politician) =

American politician and member of the Vermont State House of Representatives

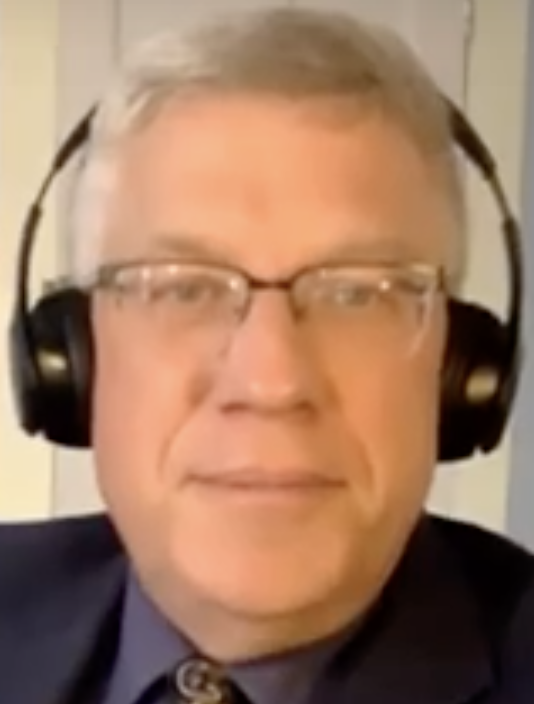
- Stevens in 2021

Member of the Vermont House of Representatives from the Washington-Chittenden district
- Incumbent
- Assumed office 2009
- Succeeded by: Katarina Lisaius (elect)

Personal details
- Born: New Haven, Connecticut, U.S.
- Party: Democratic
- Children: 3
- Education: Boston University (BA)

Tom Stevens is an American politician who has served in the Vermont House of Representatives since 2009.
