= Mike Mrowicki =

American politician and member of the Vermont State House of Representatives

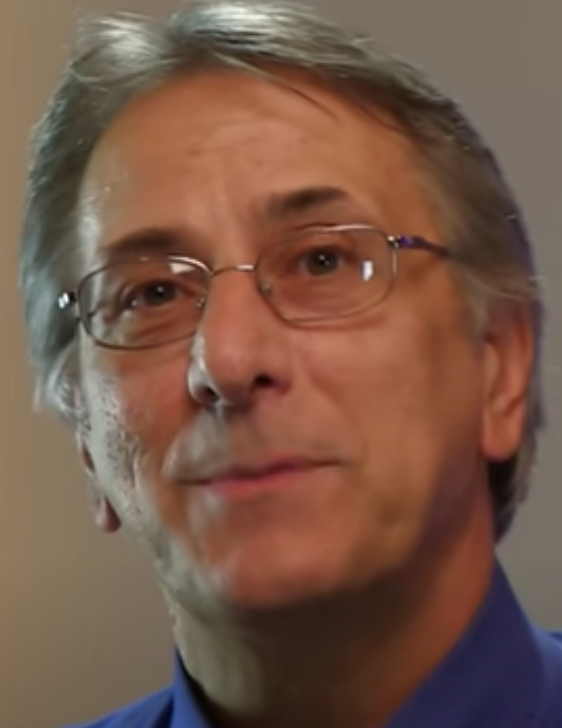
- Mrowicki in 2013

Member of the Vermont House of Representatives from the Windham 4 district
- Incumbent
- Assumed office 2009

Personal details
- Born: Jersey City, New Jersey, U.S.
- Party: Democratic
- Children: 2

Mike Mrowicki is an American politician who has served in the Vermont House of Representatives since 2009.
