= 2026 Vermont Senate election =

- November 5, 2026

All 30 seats in the Vermont Senate 16 seats needed for a majority
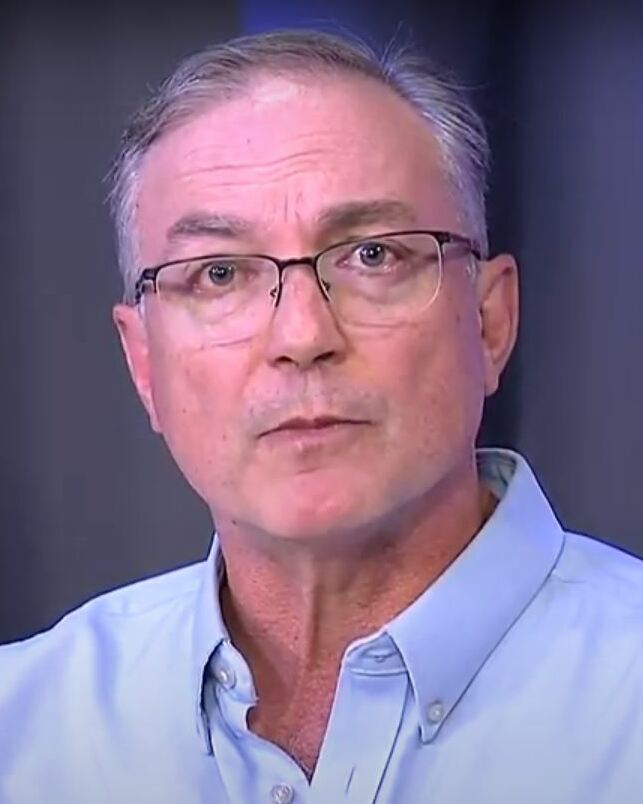

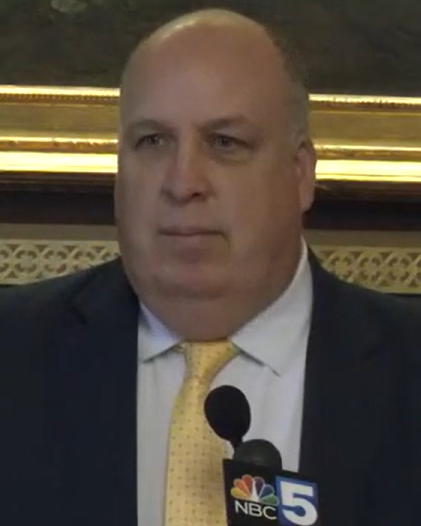

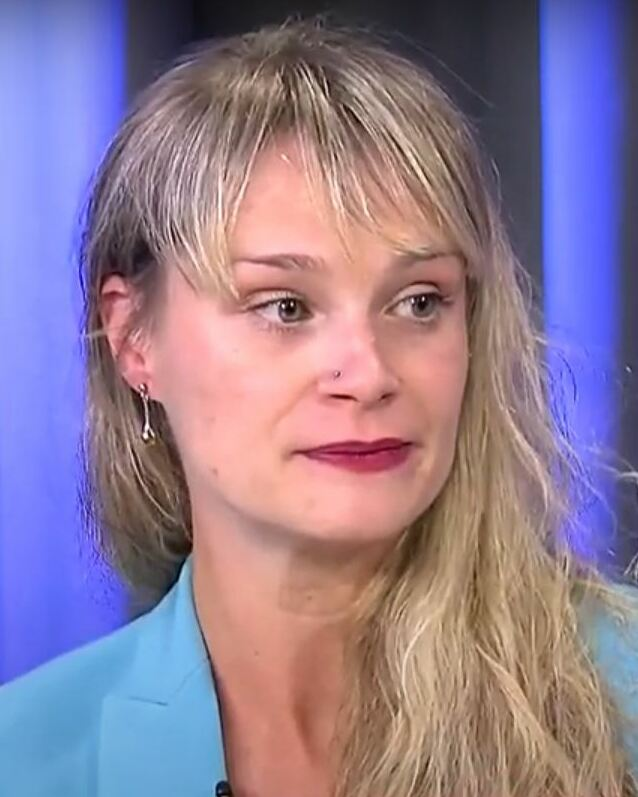
	Majority party	Minority party
Leader	Philip Baruth (retiring)	Scott Beck
Party	Democratic	Republican
Leader since	November 13, 2022	November 26, 2024
Leader's seat	Chittenden Central	Caledonia
Last election	16 seats	13 seats
Seats before	16	13
Seats won	20	8
Swing	▲4	▼5
	Third party	Fourth party
Leader	Tanya Vyhovsky (de facto)	None
Party	Progressive	Independent
Leader since	January 6, 2023	N/A
Leader's seat	Chittenden Central	N/A
Last election	1 seat	0 seats
Seats before	1	0
Seats won	1	1
Swing	Steady	▲1
President pro tempore before election
Philip Baruth
Democratic/Progressive
Elected President pro tempore
TBD

The 2026 Vermont Senate election was held on November 3, 2026, alongside the other 2026 United States elections. Primary elections were held on August 11. Vermont voters elected members of the Vermont State Senate in all 125 of the U.S. state of Vermont's legislative districts to serve a two-year term.

Voters elected all 30 state senators from 16 districts, with each district electing between one and three senators. Districts that elect more than one senator use plurality block voting; in districts that elect two senators, each voter can select up to two candidates on their ballot, and in districts that elect three senators, voters can select up to three candidates. Under Vermont's electoral fusion system, candidates can receive the nomination of more than one party, with all their nominations being listed on the ballot.

== Retirements ==
=== Democrats ===
1. Bennington: Philip Baruth is retiring.
2. Windsor: Alison Clarkson is retiring.

=== Republicans ===
1. Chittenden-North: Chris Mattos is retiring.

== Predictions ==
Source	Ranking	As of
Sabato's Crystal Ball	Safe D	January 22, 2026
State Navigate	Safe D	October 24, 2026

== Addison ==
2026 Vermont Senate Addison district election
- November 3, 2026
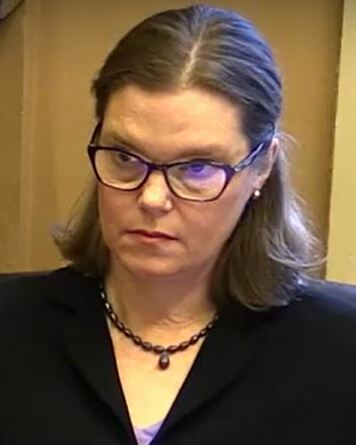

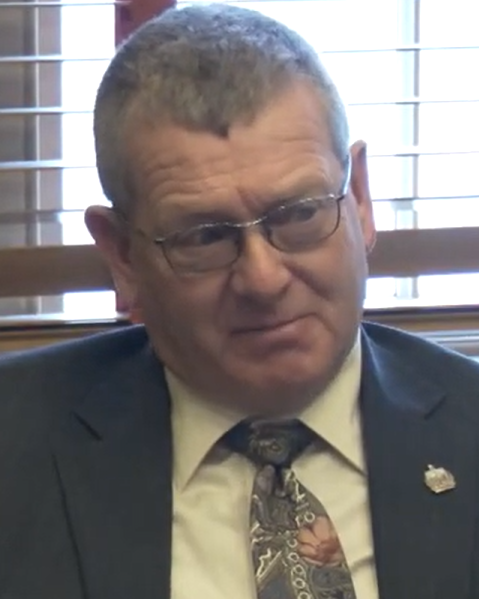
Nominee	Hannah Sessions	Ruth Hardy
Party	Democratic	Democratic
Nominee	Steven Heffernan	Andrew Klein
Party	Republican	Republican
Senators before election
Ruth Hardy (Dem)
Steven Heffernan (Rep)
Elected Senators
Ruth Hardy (Dem)
Hannah Sessions (Dem)

- Elects two senators.

The incumbents were Democrat Ruth Hardy and Republican Steven Heffernan, who won with 27.5% and 27.3% of the vote in 2024, respectively. Hardy and Heffernan ran for re-election.

=== Democratic primary ===
==== Declared ====
- Ruth Hardy, incumbent senator
- Hannah Sessions, former member of the Vermont Housing and Conservation Board

==== Endorsements ====
Ruth Hardy

Organizations

- Sierra Club Vermont (co-endorsement with Sessions)
- Vermont Conservation Voters
Hannah Sessions

Organizations

- Sierra Club Vermont (co-endorsement with Hardy)
- Vermont Progressive Party

==== Results ====
Addison Senate district Democratic primary election, 2026
Party	Candidate	Votes	%
Democratic	Hannah Sessions	5,649	50.66
Democratic	Ruth Hardy (incumbent)	5,439	48.78
Write-in		62	0.56
Total votes		11,150	100.0

=== Republican primary ===
==== Declared ====
- Steven Heffernan, incumbent senator
- Andrew Klein, former member of the Middlebury Planning & Zoning Commission
- Andrea Treadway, chair of the Orwell Selectboard

==== Results ====
Addison Senate district Republican primary election, 2026
Party	Candidate	Votes	%
Republican	Steven Heffernan (incumbent)	1,638	48.40
Republican	Andrew Klein	1,132	33.45
Republican	Andrea Treadway	585	17.29
Write-in		26	0.77
Total votes		3,384	100.0

=== General election ===
==== Results ====
Addison Senate district general election, 2026
Party	Candidate	Votes	%
Democratic	Hannah Sessions		
Democratic	Ruth Hardy (incumbent)		
Republican	Steven Heffernan (incumbent)		
Republican	Andrew Klein		
Write-in			
Total votes			100.0
Democratic hold			
Democratic gain from Republican			

== Bennington ==
2026 Vermont Senate Bennington district election
- November 3, 2026
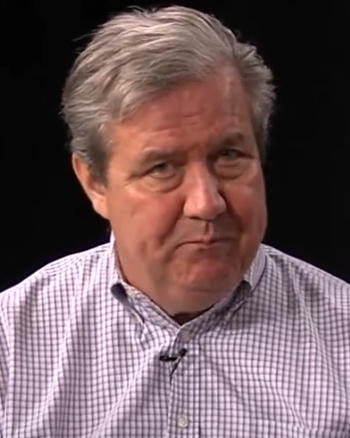

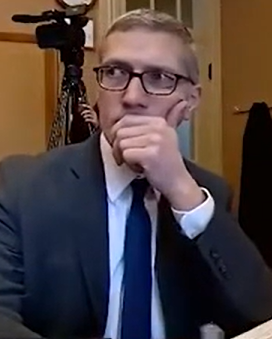
Nominee	Seth Bongartz	Rob Plunkett
Party	Democratic	Democratic
Nominee	Lawrence Whitmire	Josh Williams
Party	Republican	Republican
Senators before election
Seth Bongartz (Dem)
Rob Plunkett (Dem)
Elected Senators
Seth Bongartz (Dem)
Rob Plunkett (Dem)

- Elects two senators.

The incumbents were Democrats Seth Bongartz and Rob Plunkett, who won with 27.4% and 24.9% of the vote in 2024, respectively (52.3% combined). Bongartz and Plunkett ran for re-election.

=== Democratic primary ===
==== Declared ====
- Seth Bongartz, incumbent senator
- Amy Moore, former member of the Bennington County Regional Commission
- Rob Plunkett, incumbent senator

==== Endorsements ====
Seth Bongartz

Organizations

- Sierra Club Vermont
- Vermont Conservation Voters (co-endorsement with Plunkett)
- Vermont State Employees' Association (co-endorsement with Plunkett)
Rob Plunkett

Organizations

- Vermont Conservation Voters (co-endorsement with Bongartz)
- Vermont State Employees' Association (co-endorsement with Bongartz)

==== Results ====
Bennington Senate district Democratic primary election, 2026
Party	Candidate	Votes	%
Democratic	Seth Bongartz (incumbent)	2,830	38.09
Democratic	Rob Plunkett (incumbent)	2,712	36.50
Democratic	Amy Moore	1,808	24.33
Write-in		76	1.0%
Total votes		7,430	100.0

=== Republican primary ===
==== Declared ====
- Lawrence Whitmire, construction contractor and independent candidate for this district in 2024
- Josh Williams, real estate agent

==== Results ====
Bennington Senate district Republican primary election, 2026
Party	Candidate	Votes	%
Republican	Lawrence Whitmire	1,207	58.94
Republican	Josh Williams	806	39.36
Write-in		32	1.56
Total votes		2,048	100.0

=== Progressive primary ===
==== Declared ====
- Rachel Shaw, sales and marketing professional

==== Endorsements ====
Rachel Shaw

Organizations

- Vermont Progressive Party

==== Results ====
Bennington Senate district Progressive primary election, 2026
Party	Candidate	Votes	%
Progressive	Rachel Shaw	27	71.05
Write-in		11	28.95
Total votes		38	100.0

=== General election ===
==== Results ====
Bennington Senate district general election, 2026
Party	Candidate	Votes	%
Democratic	Seth Bongartz (incumbent)		
Democratic	Rob Plunkett (incumbent)		
Progressive	Rachel Shaw		
Republican	Lawrence Whitmire		
Republican	Josh Williams		
Write-in			
Total votes			100.0
Democratic hold			
Democratic hold			

== Caledonia ==
2026 Vermont Senate Caledonia district election
- November 3, 2026
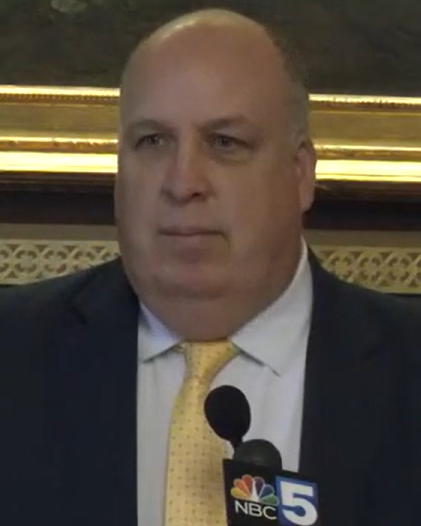

Nominee	Scott Beck	David Roth
Party	Republican	Democratic
Senator before election
Scott Beck
Republican
Elected Senator
Scott Beck
Republican

The incumbent was Republican Scott Beck, who won with 58.3% of the vote in 2024. Beck ran for re-election.

=== Republican primary ===
==== Declared ====
- Scott Beck, incumbent senator

==== Results ====
Caledonia Senate district Republican primary election, 2026
Party	Candidate	Votes	%
Republican	Scott Beck (incumbent)	1,096	98.65
Write-in		15	1.35
Total votes		1,211	100.0

=== Democratic primary ===
==== Declared ====
- David Roth, former member of the Vermont Future of Agriculture Commission

==== Results ====
Caledonia Senate district Democratic primary election, 2026
Party	Candidate	Votes	%
Democratic	David Roth	1,997	96.38
Write-in		75	3.62
Total votes		2,072	100.0

=== General election ===
==== Results ====
Caledonia Senate district general election, 2026
Party	Candidate	Votes	%
Republican	Scott Beck (incumbent)		
Democratic	David Roth		
Write-in			
Total votes			100.0
Republican hold			

== Chittenden Central ==
2026 Vermont Senate Chittenden Central district election
- November 3, 2026
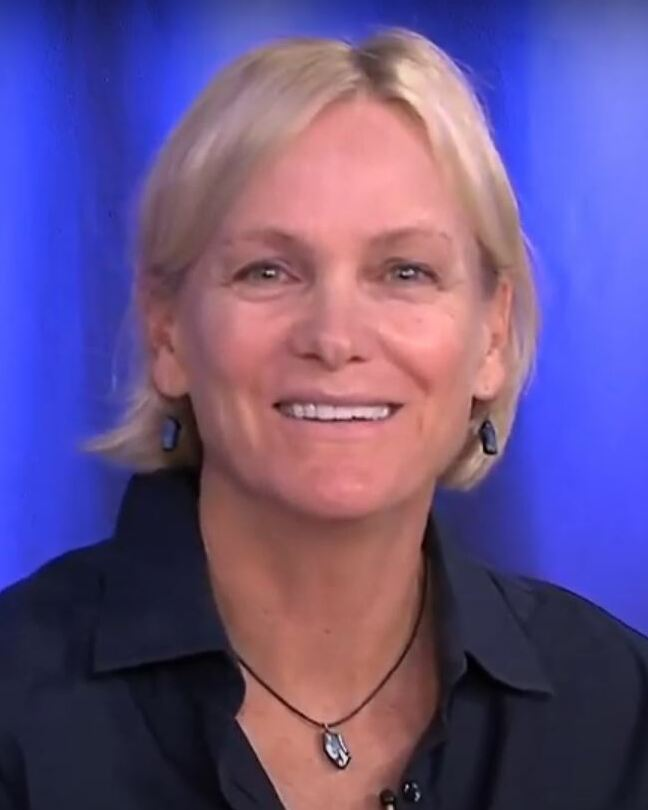

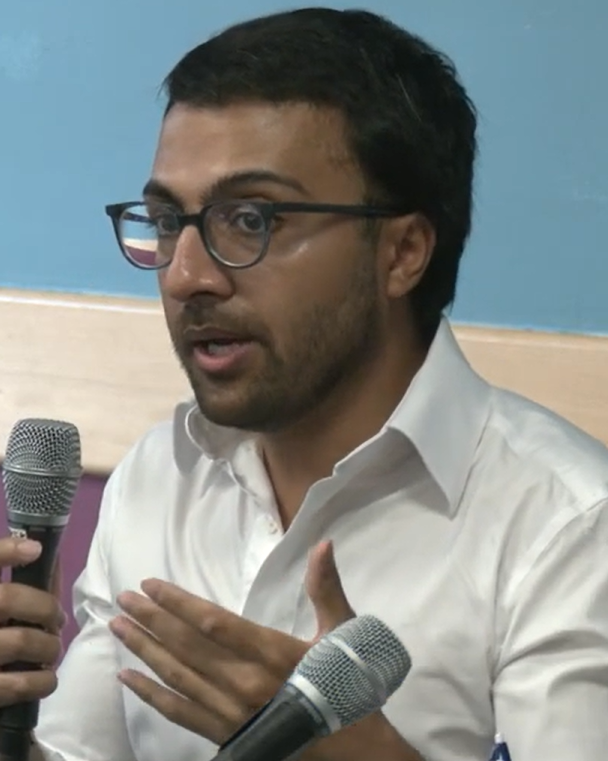

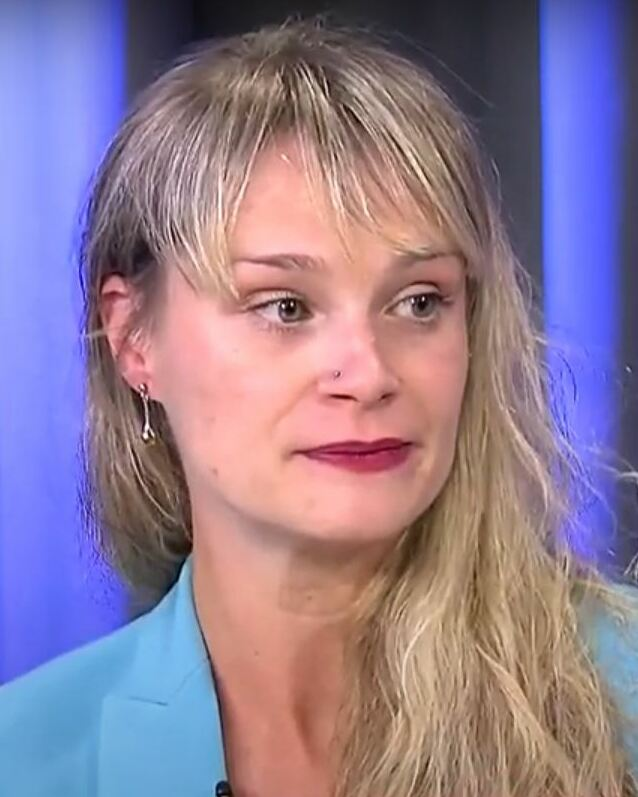
Nominee	Martine Gulick	Nikhil Goyal
Party	Democratic	Democratic
Alliance		Progressive
Nominee	Tanya Vyhovsky	Louie Manno
Party	Progressive	Republican
Alliance	Democratic
Senators before election
Martine Gulick (Dem)
Philip Baruth (Dem/Prog)
Tanya Vyhovsky (Prog/Dem)
Elected Senators
Nikhil Goyal (Dem/Prog)
Martine Gulick (Dem)
Tanya Vyhovsky (Prog/Dem)

- Elects three senators.

The incumbents were Democrats Philip Baruth and Martine Gulick and Progressive Tanya Vyhovsky, who won unopposed in 2024. Gulick and Vyhovsky ran for re-election, while Baruth is not.

=== Democratic primary ===
==== Declared ====
- Nikhil Goyal, former senior policy adviser to U.S. Senator Bernie Sanders
- Martine Gulick, incumbent senator
- Elaine Haney, Essex Junction city councilor
- Tanya Vyhovsky, incumbent senator

==== Declined ====
- Philip Baruth, incumbent senator and president pro tempore

==== Endorsements ====
Nikhil Goyal

Organizations

- Vermont Progressive Party (co-endorsement with Vyhovsky)
- Vermont State Employees' Association (co-endorsement with Gulick and Vyhovsky)
Martine Gulick

Organizations

- Sierra Club Vermont (co-endorsement with Vyhovsky)
- Vermont Conservation Voters (co-endorsement with Vyhovsky)
- Vermont State Employees' Association (co-endorsement with Goyal and Vyhovsky)
Tanya Vyhovsky

Organizations

- Green Mountain Democratic Socialists of America
- Sierra Club Vermont (co-endorsement with Gulick)
- Vermont Conservation Voters (co-endorsement with Gulick)
- Vermont Progressive Party (co-endorsement with Goyal)
- Vermont State Employees' Association (co-endorsement with Goyal and Gulick)

==== Results ====
Chittenden Central Senate district Democratic primary election, 2026
Party	Candidate	Votes	%
Democratic	Nikhil Goyal	6,598	27.50
Democratic	Martine Gulick (incumbent)	6,256	26.07
Democratic	Tanya Vyhovsky (incumbent)	5,830	24.30
Democratic	Elaine Haney	5,157	21.49
Write-in		143	0.60
Total votes		23,996	100.0

=== Republican primary ===
==== Nominated after primary ====
- Louie Manno, grocery store owner and former radio host

=== General election ===
==== Results ====
Chittenden Central Senate district general election, 2026
Party	Candidate	Votes	%
Democratic	Martine Gulick (incumbent)		
Democratic/Progressive	Nikhil Goyal		
Progressive/Democratic	Tanya Vyhovsky (incumbent)		
Republican	Louie Manno		
Write-in			
Total votes			100.0
Democratic hold			
Democratic hold			
Progressive hold			

== Chittenden North ==
2026 Vermont Senate Chittenden North district election
- November 3, 2026
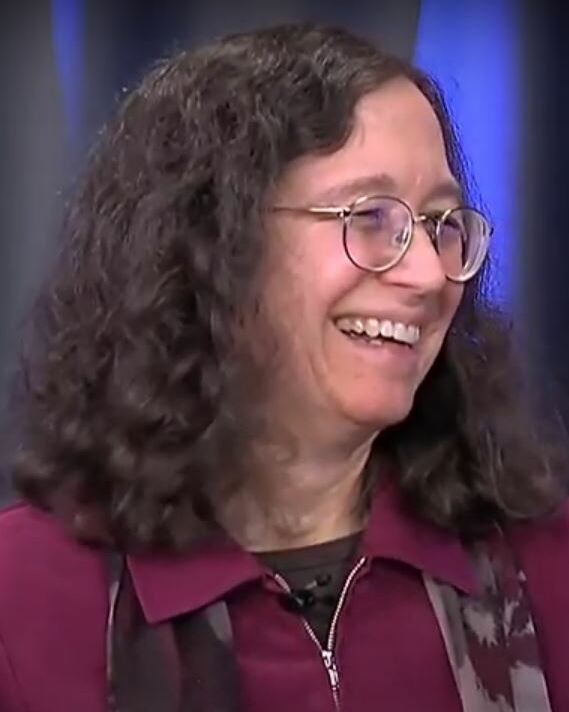

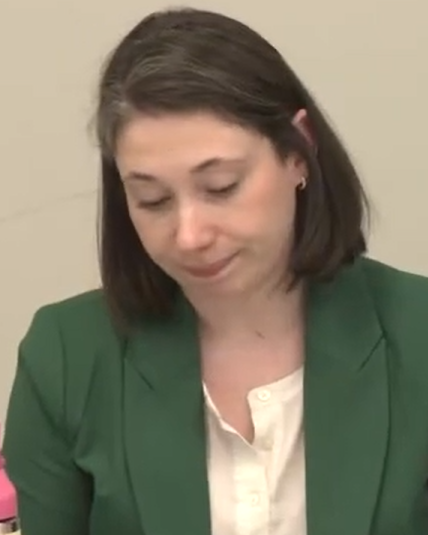
Nominee	Irene Wrenner	Ashley Bartley
Party	Democratic	Republican
Senator before election
Chris Mattos
Republican
Elected Senator
Irene Wrenner
Democratic

The incumbent was Republican Chris Mattos, who won with 56.0% of the vote in 2024. Mattos is not running for re-election.

=== Republican primary ===
==== Declared ====
- Ashley Bartley, state representative

==== Declined ====
- Chris Mattos, incumbent senator

==== Results ====
Chittenden North Senate district Republican primary election, 2026
Party	Candidate	Votes	%
Republican	Ashley Bartley	757	98.18
Write-in		14	1.82
Total votes		771	100.0

=== Democratic primary ===
==== Declared ====
- Irene Wrenner, former state senator

==== Results ====
Chittenden North Senate district Democratic primary election, 2026
Party	Candidate	Votes	%
Democratic	Irene Wrenner	2,184	94.63
Write-in		124	5.37
Total votes		2,308	100.0

=== General election ===
==== Results ====
Chittenden North Senate district general election, 2026
Party	Candidate	Votes	%
Democratic	Irene Wrenner		
Republican	Ashley Bartley		
Write-in			
Total votes			100.0
Democratic gain from Republican			

== Chittenden Southeast ==
2026 Vermont Senate Chittenden Southeast district election
- November 3, 2026
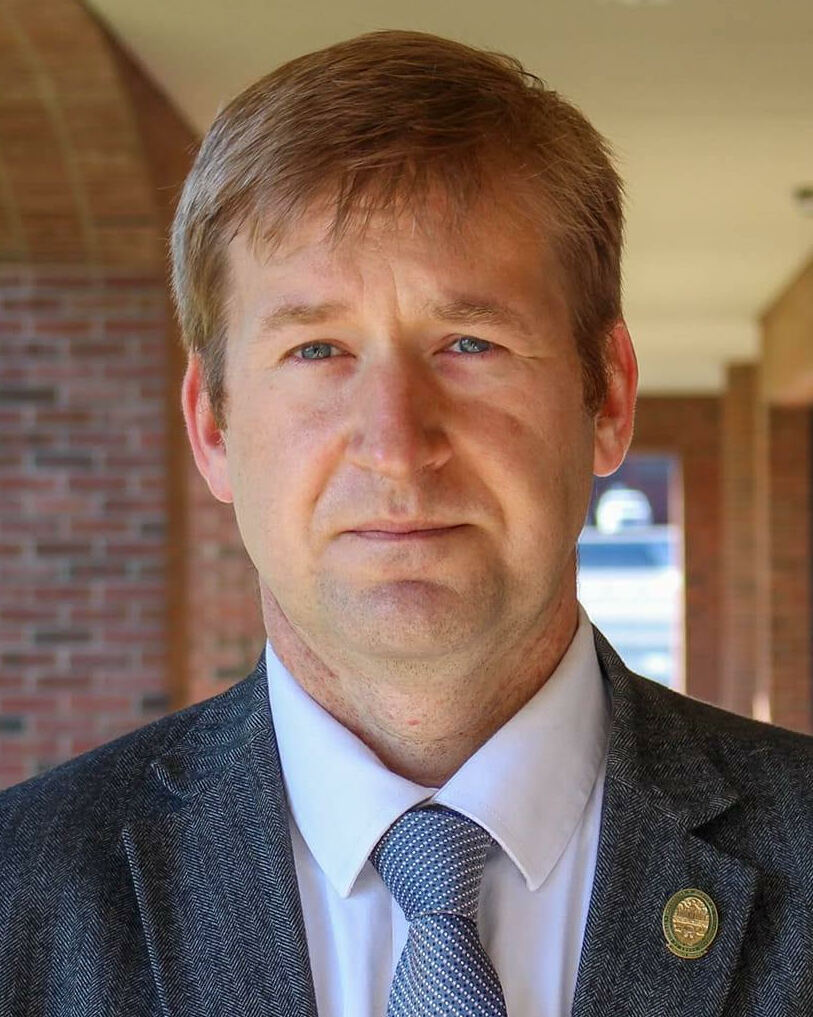

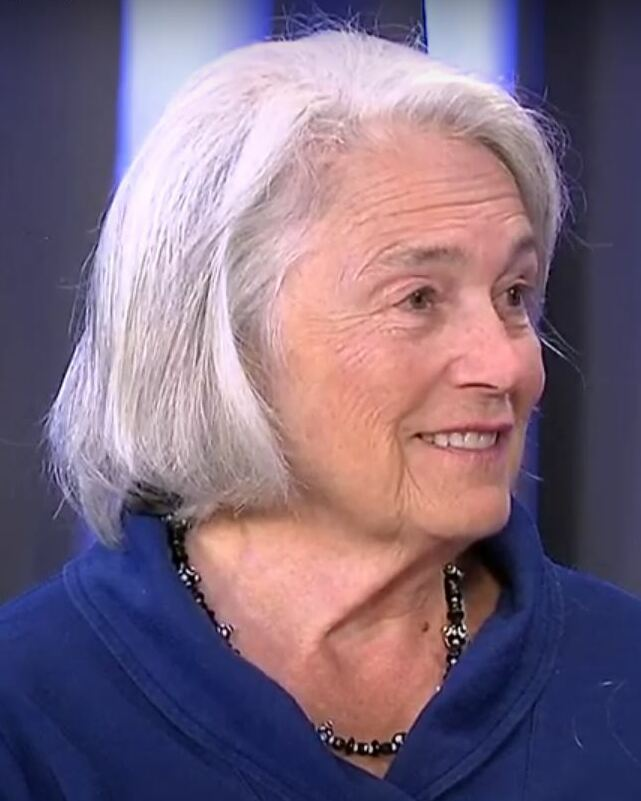

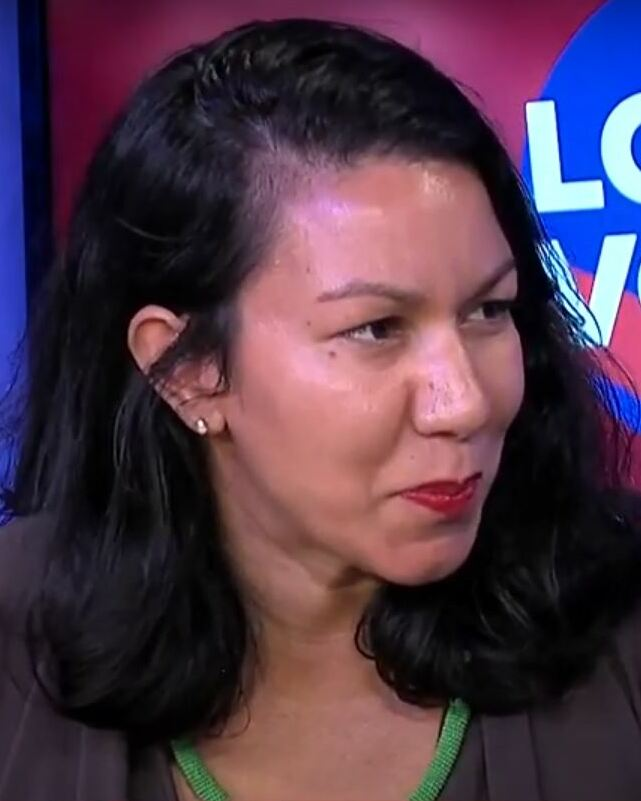

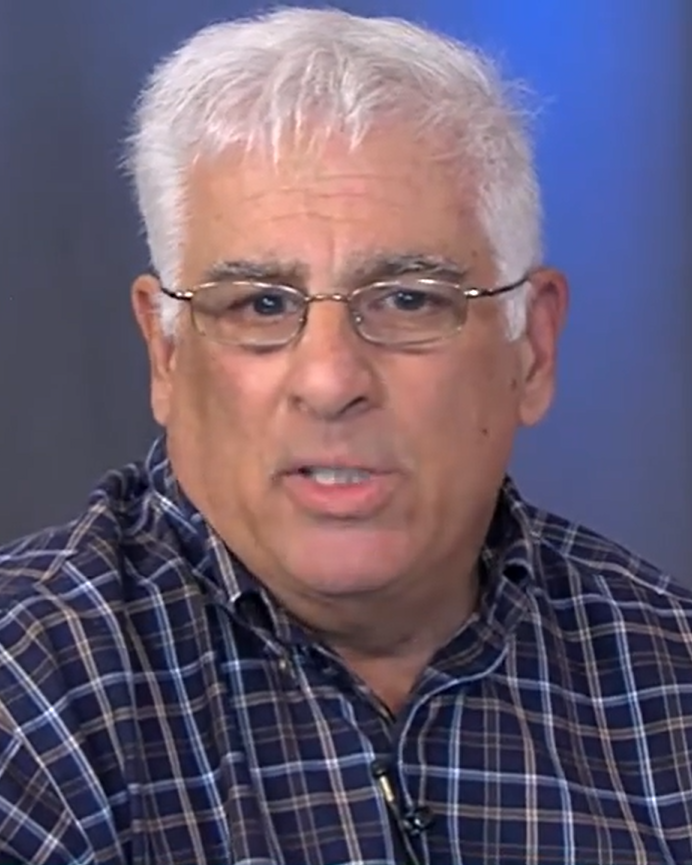
Nominee	Thomas Chittenden	Ginny Lyons	Kesha Ram Hinsdale
Party	Democratic	Democratic	Democratic
Nominee	Bruce Roy	Javen Sears	Rohan St. Marthe
Party	Republican	Republican	Republican
Senators before election
Thomas Chittenden (Dem)
Kesha Ram Hinsdale (Dem/Prog)
Ginny Lyons (Dem)
Elected Senators
Thomas Chittenden (Dem)
Kesha Ram Hinsdale (Dem/Prog)
Ginny Lyons (Dem)

- Elects three senators.

The incumbents were Democrats Thomas Chittenden, Kesha Ram Hinsdale, and Ginny Lyons, who won with 26.9%, 20.1%, and 23.3% of the vote in 2024, respectively (70.3% combined). All three incumbents ran for re-election.

=== Democratic primary ===
==== Declared ====
- Thomas Chittenden, incumbent senator
- Joanna Grossman, former chair of the Chittenden County Democratic Party
- Kesha Ram Hinsdale, incumbent senator
- Elizabeth Hunt, pediatrician
- Ginny Lyons, incumbent senator

==== Endorsements ====
Thomas Chittenden

Organizations

- Vermont State Employees' Association (co-endorsement with Hinsdale and Lyons)
Kesha Ram Hinsdale

Organizations

- Vermont Conservation Voters (co-endorsement with Lyons)
- Vermont State Employees' Association (co-endorsement with Chittenden and Lyons)
Ginny Lyons

Organizations

- Vermont Conservation Voters (co-endorsement with Hinsdale)
- Vermont State Employees' Association (co-endorsement with Chittenden and Hinsdale)

==== Results ====
Chittenden Southeast Senate district Democratic primary election, 2026
Party	Candidate	Votes	%
Democratic	Thomas Chittenden (incumbent)	9,332	24.04
Democratic	Kesha Ram Hinsdale (incumbent)	9,160	23.60
Democratic	Ginny Lyons (incumbent)	8,428	21.71
Democratic	Elizabeth Hunt	6,571	16.93
Democratic	Joanna Grossman	5,131	13.22
Write-in		208	0.54
Total votes		38,821	100.0

=== Republican primary ===
==== Declared ====
- Bruce Roy, former Essex Junction school board member and nominee for this district in 2024
- Javen Sears, high school track and debate coach
- Rohan St. Marthe, store manager and nominee for this district in 2022 and 2024 (write-in)

==== Results ====
Chittenden Southeast Senate district Republican primary election, 2026
Party	Candidate	Votes	%
Republican	Bruce Roy	1,187	54.85
Republican	Javen Sears	773	35.72
Republican	Rohan St. Marthe (write-in)	83	3.84
Write-in		103	4.76
Total votes		2,164	100.0

==== Results ====
Chittenden Southeast Senate district Republican primary election, 2026
Party	Candidate	Votes	%
Democratic	Thomas Chittenden (incumbent)		
Democratic	Ginny Lyons (incumbent)		
Democratic	Kesha Ram Hinsdale (incumbent)		
Republican	Bruce Roy		
Republican	Javen Sears		
Republican	Rohan St. Marthe		
Write-in			
Total votes			100.0
Democratic hold			
Democratic hold			
Democratic hold			

== Essex ==
2026 Vermont Senate Essex district election
- November 3, 2026
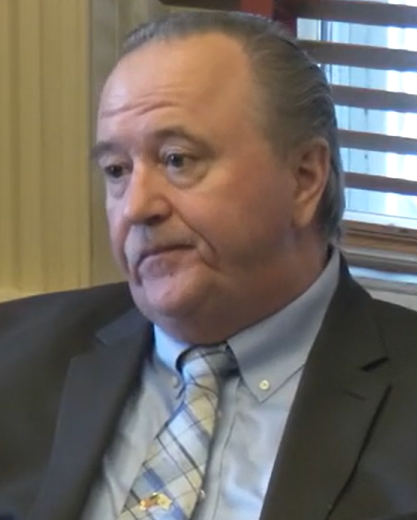
Nominee	Russ Ingalls
Party	Republican
Senator before election
Russ Ingalls
Republican
Elected Senator
Russ Ingalls
Republican

The incumbent was Republican Russ Ingalls, who won with only write-in opposition in 2024. Ingalls ran for re-election.

=== Republican primary ===
==== Declared ====
- Russ Ingalls, incumbent senator

==== Results ====
Essex Senate district Republican primary election, 2026
Party	Candidate	Votes	%
Republican	Russ Ingalls (incumbent)	1,121	98.85
Write-in		13	1.15
Total votes		1,134	100.0

=== General election ===
==== Results ====
Essex Senate district general election, 2026
Party	Candidate	Votes	%
Republican	Russ Ingalls (incumbent)		
Write-in			
Total votes			100.0
Republican hold			

== Franklin ==
2026 Vermont Senate Franklin district election
- November 3, 2026
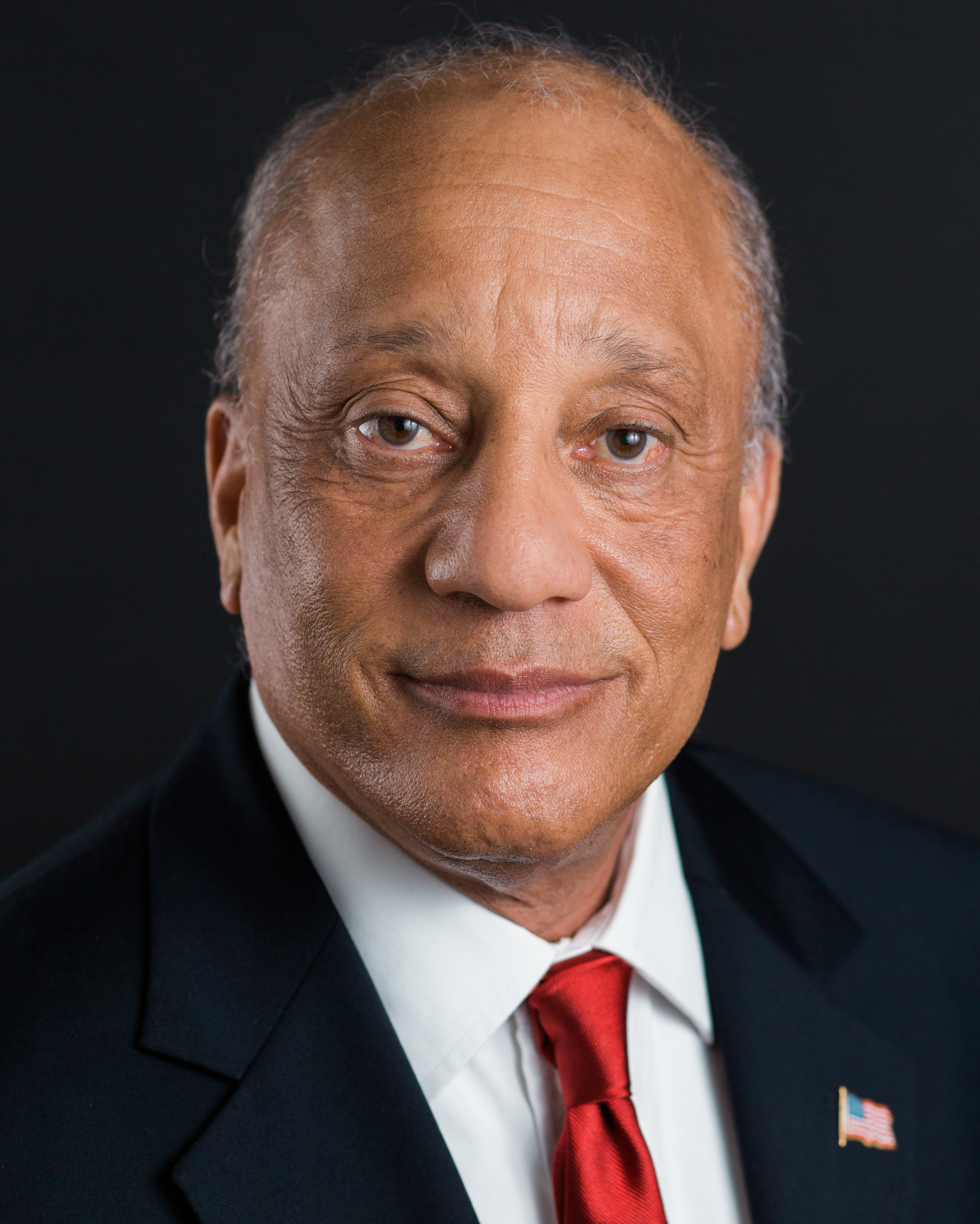

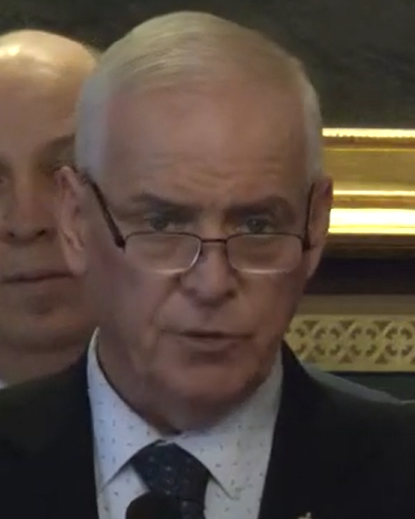
Nominee	Randy Brock	Robert Norris
Party	Republican	Republican
Nominee	Alexander Bobella	Gregory Rainville
Party	Democratic	Democratic
Senators before election
Randy Brock (Rep)
Robert Norris (Rep)
Elected Senators
Randy Brock (Rep)
Robert Norris (Rep)

- Elects two senators.

The incumbents were Republicans Randy Brock and Robert Norris, who won unopposed in 2024. Brock and Norris ran for re-election.

=== Republican primary ===
==== Declared ====
- Randy Brock, incumbent senator
- Robert Norris, incumbent senator

==== Results ====
Franklin Senate district Republican primary election, 2026
Party	Candidate	Votes	%
Republican	Robert Norris (incumbent)	1,491	49.62
Republican	Randy Brock (incumbent)	1,443	48.02
Write-in		65	2.16
Total votes		3,005	100.0

=== Democratic primary ===
==== Declared ====
- Alexander Bobella, member of the St. Albans Climate and Energy Advisory Commission
- Gregory Rainville, former Vermont Superior Court judge

==== Endorsements ====
Alexander Bobella

Organizations

- Green Mountain Democratic Socialists of America

==== Results ====
Franklin Senate district Democratic primary election, 2026
Party	Candidate	Votes	%
Democratic	Gregory Rainville	1,800	50.27
Democratic	Alexander Bobella	1,570	43.84
Write-in		207	5.78
Total votes		3,581	100.0

=== General election ===
==== Results ====
Franklin Senate district general election, 2026
Party	Candidate	Votes	%
Republican	Randy Brock (incumbent)		
Republican	Robert Norris (incumbent)		
Democratic	Alexander Bobella		
Democratic	Gregory Rainville		
Write-in			
Total votes			100.0
Republican hold			
Republican hold			

== Grand Isle ==
2026 Vermont Senate Grand Isle district election
- November 3, 2026

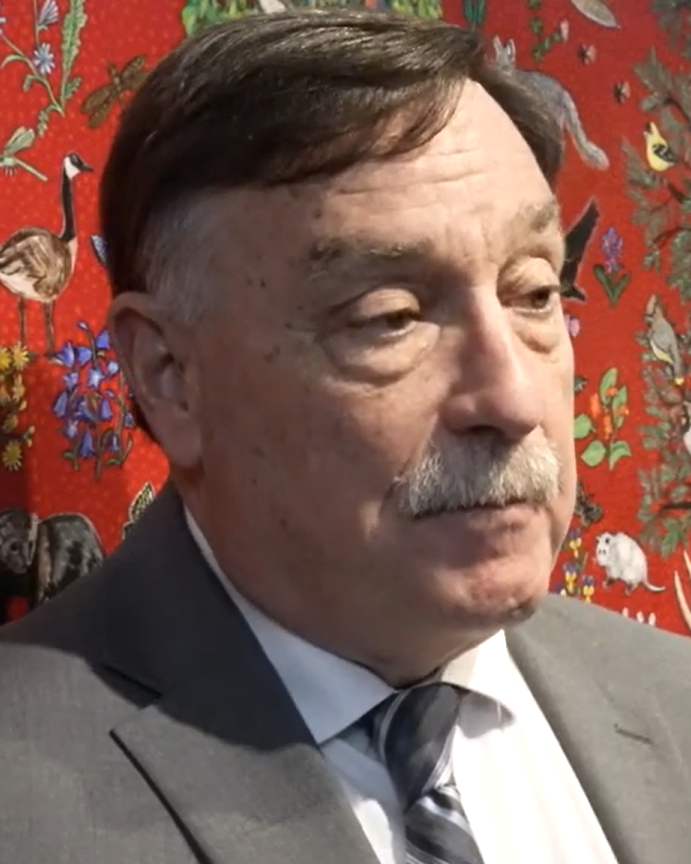
Nominee	Kim Gleason	Patrick Brennan
Party	Democratic	Republican
Senator before election
Patrick Brennan
Republican
Elected Senator
Kim Gleason
Democratic

The incumbent was Republican Patrick Brennan, who won with 52.8% of the vote in 2024. Brennan ran for re-election.

=== Republican primary ===
==== Declared ====
- Patrick Brennan, incumbent senator

==== Results ====
Grand Isle Senate district Republican primary election, 2026
Party	Candidate	Votes	%
Republican	Patrick Brennan (incumbent)	718	99.31
Write-in		5	0.07
Total votes		723	100.0

=== Democratic primary ===
==== Declared ====
- Kim Gleason, former member of the Vermont State Board of Education

==== Results ====
Grand Isle Senate district Democratic primary election, 2026
Party	Candidate	Votes	%
Democratic	Kim Gleason	2,479	95.13
Write-in		127	4.87
Total votes		2,606	100.0

=== General election ===
==== Results ====
Grand Isle Senate district general election, 2026
Party	Candidate	Votes	%
Democratic	Kim Gleason		
Republican	Patrick Brennan (incumbent)		
Write-in			
Total votes			100.0
Democratic gain from Republican			

== Lamoille ==
2026 Vermont Senate Lamoille district election
- November 3, 2026
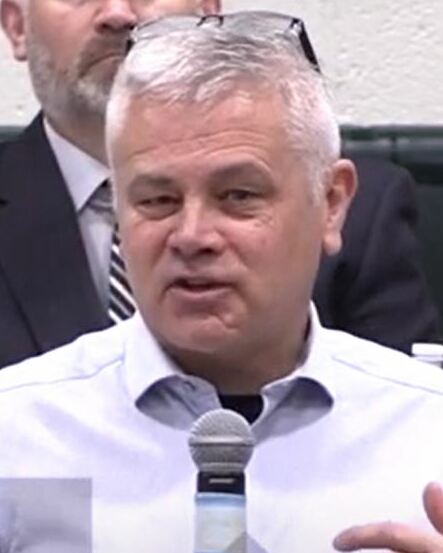
Nominee	Richard Westman
Party	Republican
Senator before election
Richard Westman
Republican
Elected Senator
Richard Westman
Republican

The incumbent was Republican Richard Westman, who won with 64.0% of the vote in 2024 against an independent candidate. Westman ran for re-election.

=== Republican primary ===
==== Declared ====
- Richard Westman, incumbent senator

==== Results ====
Lamoille Senate district Republican primary election, 2026
Party	Candidate	Votes	%
Republican	Richard Westman (incumbent)	571	98.45
Write-in		9	1.55
Total votes		580	100.0

=== General election ===
==== Results ====
Lamoille Senate district general election, 2026
Party	Candidate	Votes	%
Republican	Richard Westman (incumbent)		
Write-in			
Total votes			100.0
Republican hold			

== Orange ==
2026 Vermont Senate Orange district election
- November 3, 2026
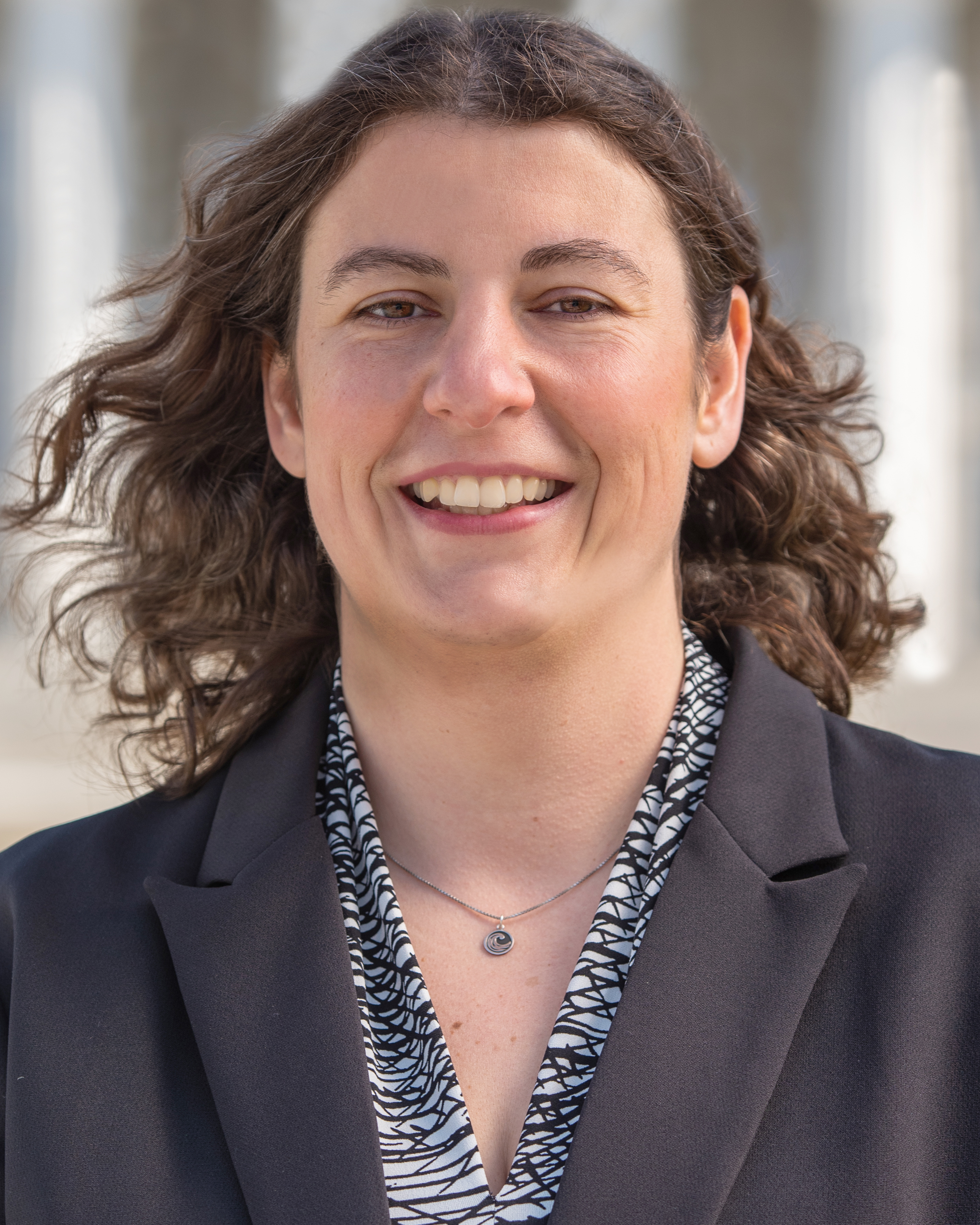

Nominee	Monique Priestley	John Benson
Party	Democratic	Republican
Senator before election
John Benson
Republican
Elected Senator
Monique Priestley
Democratic

The incumbent was Republican Larry Hart, who won with 56.5% of the vote in 2024 before stepping down in October 2025 to prioritize his "health and emotional well-being." Governor Phil Scott appointed Brookfield Selectboard chair John Benson to replace Hart. Benson ran for a full term in office.

=== Republican primary ===
==== Declared ====
- John Benson, appointed incumbent senator

==== Results ====
Orange Senate district Republican primary election, 2026
Party	Candidate	Votes	%
Republican	John Benson (incumbent)	936	98.32
Write-in		16	1.68
Total votes		952	100.0

=== Democratic primary ===
==== Declared ====
- Rose Lucenti, Randolph Justice of the Peace
- Monique Priestley, state representative

==== Endorsements ====
Rose Lucenti

Organizations

- Vermont State Employees' Association

==== Results ====
Orange Senate district Democratic primary election, 2026
Party	Candidate	Votes	%
Democratic	Monique Priestley	1,874	70.82
Democratic	Rose Lucenti	745	28.16
Write-in		26	0.98
Total votes		2,646	100.0

=== General election ===
==== Results ====
Orange Senate district general election, 2026
Party	Candidate	Votes	%
Democratic	Monique Priestley		
Republican	John Benson (incumbent)		
Write-in			
Total votes			100.0
Democratic gain from Republican			

== Orleans ==
2026 Vermont Senate Orleans district election
- November 3, 2026
Nominee	John Morley
Party	Republican
Senator before election
John Morley
Republican
Elected Senator
John Morley
Republican

The incumbent was Republican Samuel Douglass, who won with 59.2% of the vote in 2024 before stepping down in October 2025 after facing calls to resign due to his involvement in the Young Republican group chat leaks. Governor Phil Scott appointed former state representative John Morley to replace Douglass. Morley ran for a full term in office.

=== Republican primary ===
==== Declared ====
- John Morley, appointed incumbent senator

==== Results ====
Orleans Senate district Republican primary election, 2026
Party	Candidate	Votes	%
Republican	John Morley (incumbent)	855	99.65
Write-in		3	0.35
Total votes		858	100.0

=== Democratic primary ===
==== Withdrawn ====
- Gaston Bathalon, Troy selectman

=== General election ===
==== Results ====
Orleans Senate district general election, 2026
Party	Candidate	Votes	%
Republican	John Morley (incumbent)		
Write-in			
Total votes			100.0
Republican hold			

== Rutland ==
2026 Vermont Senate Rutland district election
- November 5, 2026
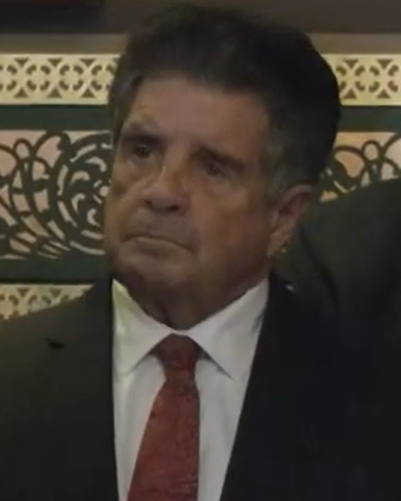

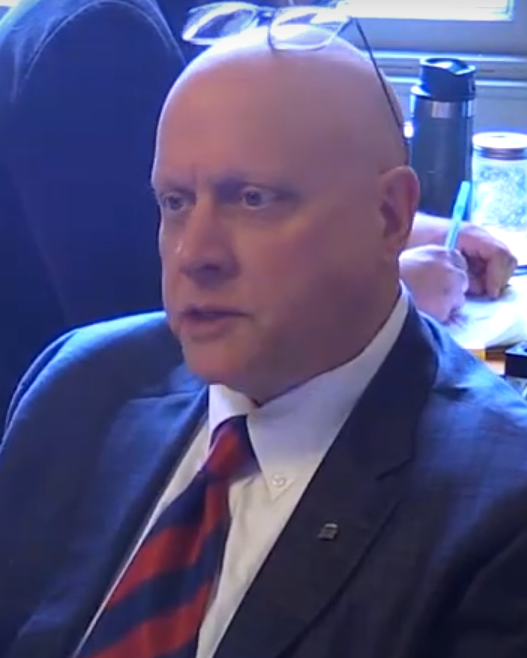

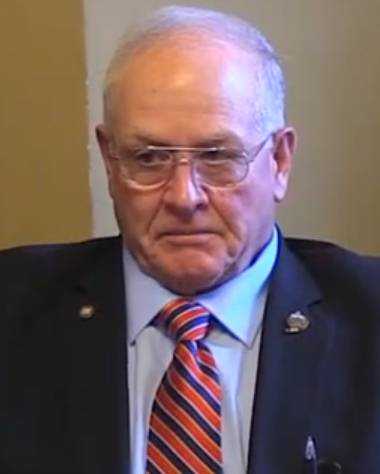
Nominee	Brian Collamore	Dave Wolk
Party	Republican	Independent
Nominee	Dave Weeks	Terry Williams
Party	Republican	Republican
Senators before election
Brian Collamore (Rep)
Dave Weeks (Rep)
Terry Williams (Rep)
Elected Senators
Brian Collamore (Rep)
Dave Weeks (Rep)
Dave Wolk (Ind)

- Elects three senators.

The incumbents were Republicans Brian Collamore, Terry Williams, and Dave Weeks, who won with 22.5%, 19.7%, and 19.6% of the vote in 2024, respectively (61.8% combined). All three incumbents ran for re-election.

=== Republican primary ===
==== Declared ====
- Brian Collamore, incumbent senator
- Dave Weeks, incumbent senator
- Terry Williams, incumbent senator

==== Results ====
Rutland Senate district Republican primary election, 2026
Party	Candidate	Votes	%
Republican	Brian Collamore (incumbent)	2,234	35.16
Republican	Terry Williams (incumbent)	2,088	32.87
Republican	Dave Weeks (incumbent)	2,011	31.65
Write-in		17	0.27
Total votes		6,353	100.0

=== Independents ===
==== Declared ====
- Dave Wolk, former Democratic state senator

==== Results ====
Rutland Senate district general election, 2026
Party	Candidate	Votes	%
Republican	Brian Collamore (incumbent)		
Independent	Dave Wolk		
Republican	Dave Weeks (incumbent)		
Republican	Terry Williams (incumbent)		
Write-in			
Total votes			100.0
Republican hold			
Independent gain from Republican			
Republican hold			

== Washington ==
2026 Vermont Senate Washington district election
- November 3, 2026
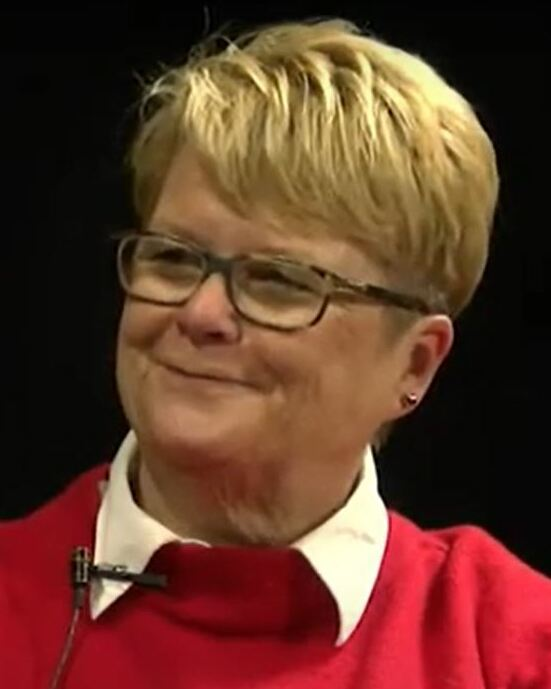

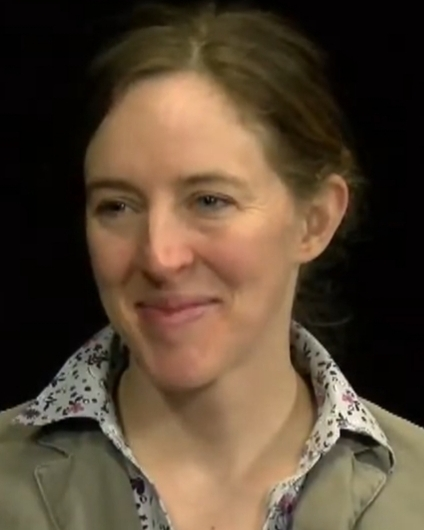

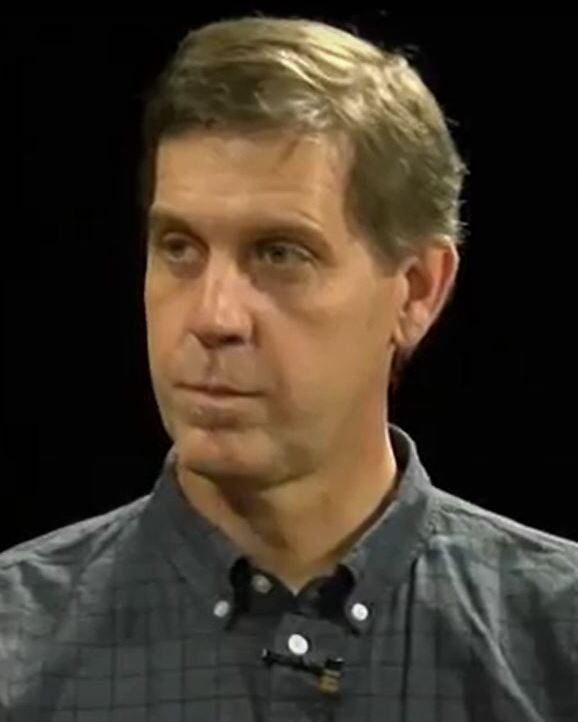

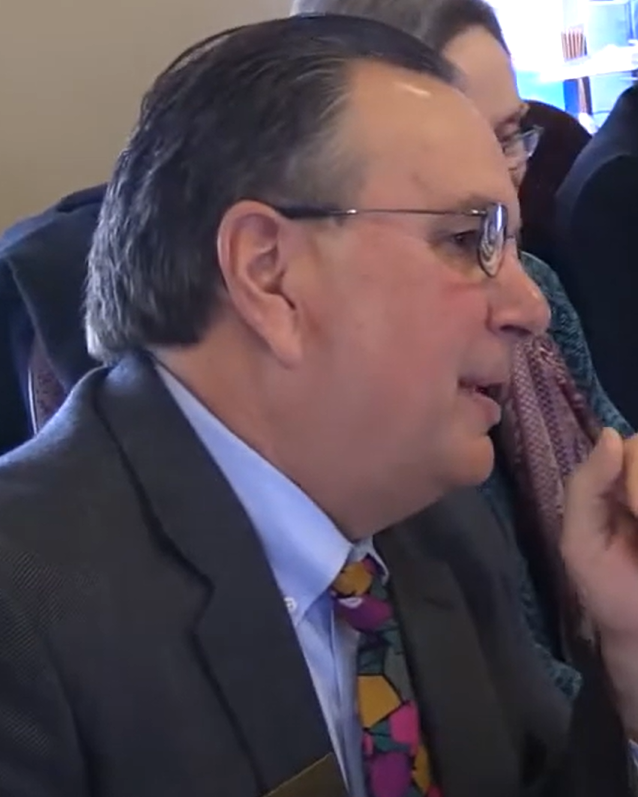

Nominee	Ann Cummings	Anne Watson	Andrew Perchlik
Party	Democratic	Democratic	Democratic
Alliance		Progressive	Progressive
Nominee	Robert LaClair	Christopher Neddo	Peter Schmeekle
Party	Republican	Republican	Republican
Senators before election
Ann Cummings (Dem)
Andrew Perchlik (Dem/Prog)
Anne Watson (Dem/Prog)
Elected Senators
Ann Cummings (Dem)
Andrew Perchlik (Dem/Prog)
Anne Watson (Dem/Prog)

- Elects three senators.

The incumbents were Democrats Ann Cummings, Andrew Perchlik, and Anne Watson, who won with 22.6%, 17.8%, and 19.2% of the vote in 2024, respectively (59.6% combined). All three incumbents ran for re-election.

=== Democratic primary ===
==== Declared ====
- Ann Cummings, incumbent senator
- Gabriel Lajeunesse, former member of the Vermont Community Development Board
- Andrew Perchlik, incumbent senator
- Anne Watson, incumbent senator

==== Endorsements ====
Ann Cummings

Organizations

- Vermont Conservation Voters (co-endorsement with Perchlik and Watson)
- Vermont State Employees' Association (co-endorsement with Perchlik and Watson)
Andrew Perchlik

Organizations

- Sierra Club Vermont (co-endorsement with Watson)
- Vermont Conservation Voters (co-endorsement with Cummings and Watson)
- Vermont State Employees' Association (co-endorsement with Cummings and Watson)
Anne Watson

Organizations

- Sierra Club Vermont (co-endorsement with Perchlik)
- Vermont Conservation Voters (co-endorsement with Cummings and Perchlik)
- Vermont State Employees' Association (co-endorsement with Cummings and Perchlik)

==== Results ====
Washington Senate district Democratic primary election, 2026
Party	Candidate	Votes	%
Democratic	Anne Watson (incumbent)	7,647	29.61
Democratic	Ann Cummings (incumbent)	7,090	27.46
Democratic	Andrew Perchlik (incumbent)	7,003	27.12
Democratic	Gabriel Lajeunesse	3,930	15.22
Write-in		143	0.55
Total votes		25,822	100.0

=== Republican primary ===
==== Declared ====
- Robert LaClair, former state representative
- Christopher Neddo, vice chair of the Barre Development Review Board
- Peter Schmeeckle, musician

==== Results ====
Washington Senate district Republican primary election, 2026
Party	Candidate	Votes	%
Republican	Robert LaClair	1,762	35.57
Republican	Christopher Neddo	1,749	35.30
Republican	Peter Schmeeckle	1,364	27.53
Write-in		79	1.59
Total votes		4,954	100.0

=== General election ===
==== Results ====
Washington Senate district general election, 2026
Party	Candidate	Votes	%
Democratic	Ann Cummings (incumbent)		
Democratic	Anne Watson (incumbent)		
Democratic	Andrew Perchlik (incumbent)		
Republican	Robert LaClair		
Republican	Christopher Neddo		
Republican	Peter Schmeeckle		
Write-in			
Total votes			100.0
Democratic hold			
Democratic hold			
Democratic hold			

== Windham ==
2026 Vermont Senate Windham district election
- November 3, 2026
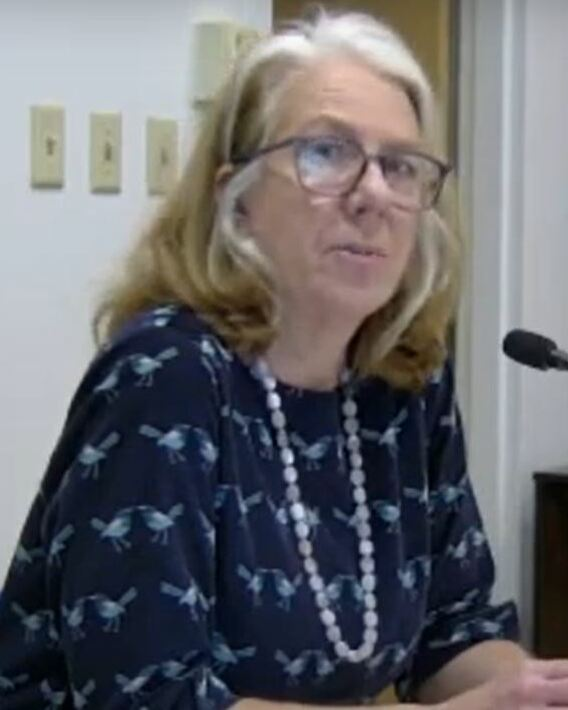

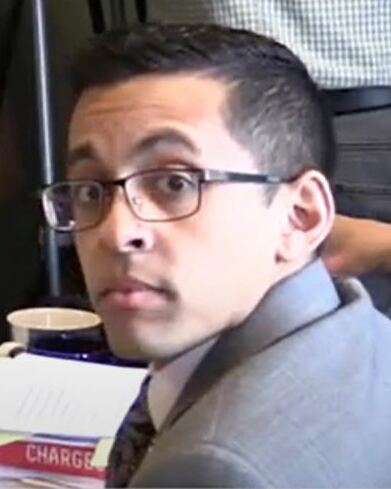
Nominee	Wendy Harrison	Nader Hashim
Party	Democratic	Democratic
Nominee	Dale Gassett	Rusty Sage
Party	Republican	Republican
Senators before election
Wendy Harrison (Dem)
Nader Hashim (Dem)
Elected Senators
Wendy Harrison (Dem)
Nader Hashim (Dem)

- Elects two senators.

The incumbents were Democrats Wendy Harrison and Nader Hashim, who won with 35.6% and 31.0% of the vote in 2024, respectively (66.6% combined). Harrison and Hashim ran for re-election.

=== Democratic primary ===
==== Declared ====
- Wendy Harrison, incumbent senator
- Nader Hashim, incumbent senator

==== Endorsements ====
Wendy Harrison

Organizations

- Sierra Club Vermont (co-endorsement with Hashim)
- Vermont Conservation Voters (co-endorsement with Hashim)
Nader Hashim

Organizations

- Sierra Club Vermont (co-endorsement with Harrison)
- Vermont Conservation Voters (co-endorsement with Harrison)

==== Results ====
Windham Senate district Democratic primary election, 2026
Party	Candidate	Votes	%
Democratic	Nader Hashim (incumbent)	4,867	50.78
Democratic	Wendy Harrison (incumbent)	4,693	48.97
Write-in		22	0.23
Total votes		9,584	100.0

=== Republican primary ===
==== Declared ====
- Dale Gassett, former chair of the Windham County Republican Party and nominee for this district in 2024
- Rusty Sage, former Marlboro Fire Chief

==== Results ====
Windham Senate district Republican primary election, 2026
Party	Candidate	Votes	%
Republican	Rusty Sage	589	49.87
Republican	Dale Gassett	579	49.03
Write-in		13	1.10
Total votes		1,181	100.0

=== General election ===
==== Results ====
Windham Senate district general election, 2026
Party	Candidate	Votes	%
Democratic	Wendy Harrison (incumbent)		
Democratic	Nader Hashim (incumbent)		
Republican	Dale Gassett		
Republican	Rusty Sage		
Write-in			
Total votes			100.0
Democratic hold			
Democratic hold			

== Windsor ==
2026 Vermont Senate Windsor district election
- November 3, 2026
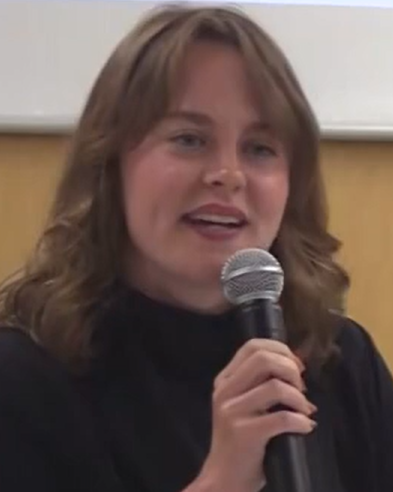

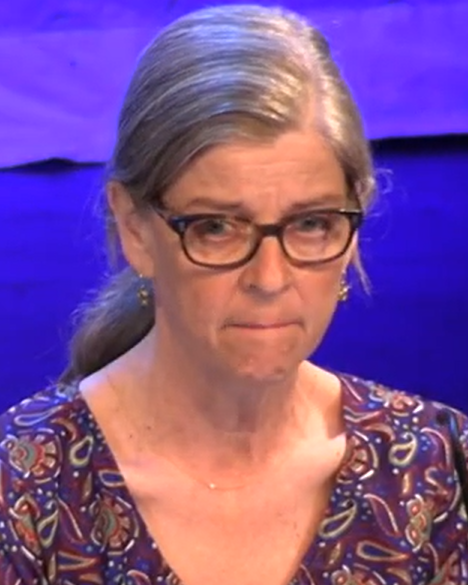

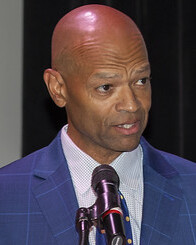

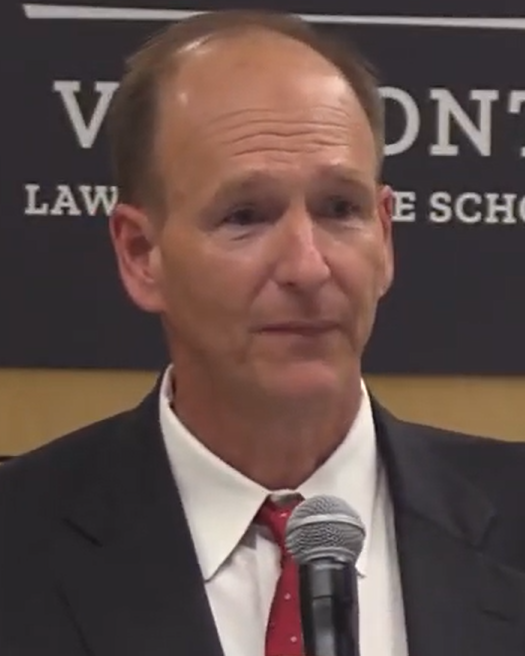

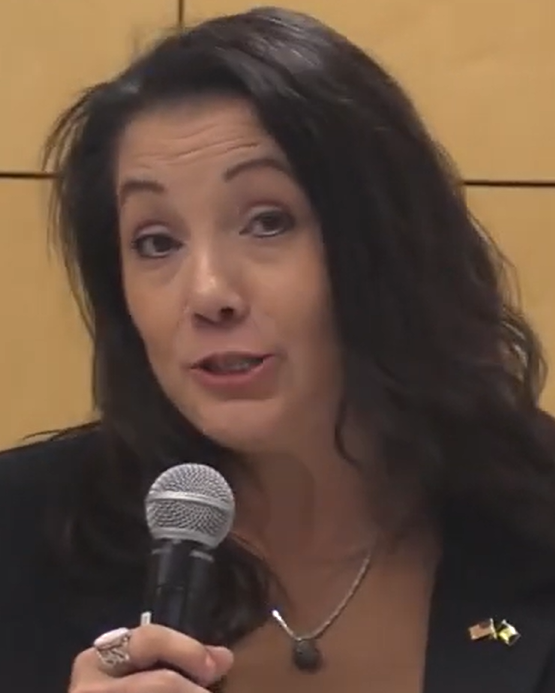

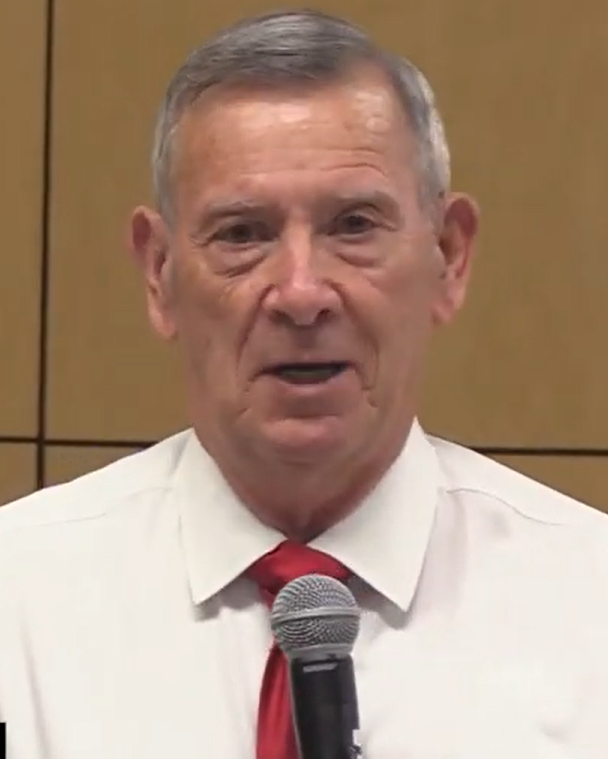
Nominee	Rebecca White	Elizabeth Burrows	Joe Major
Party	Democratic	Democratic	Democratic
Nominee	Jonathan Gleason	Andrea Murray	Jack Williams
Party	Republican	Republican	Republican
Senators before election
Alison Clarkson (Dem)
Joe Major (Dem)
Rebecca White (Dem)
Elected Senators
Elizabeth Burrows (Dem)
Joe Major (Dem)
Rebecca White (Dem)

- Elects three senators.

The incumbents were Democrats Alison Clarkson, Joe Major, and Rebecca White, who won with 20.0%, 18.8%, and 20.0% of the vote in 2024, respectively (58.8% combined). Major and White ran for re-election, while Clarkson is not.

=== Democratic primary ===
==== Declared ====
- Ben Brickner, chair of the Pomfret Selectboard
- Elizabeth Burrows, state representative
- Heather Chase, former state representative
- Chris Dube, president of Professional Fire Fighters of Vermont
- Joe Major, incumbent senator
- Rebecca White, incumbent senator

==== Declined ====
- Alison Clarkson, incumbent senator

==== Endorsements ====
Elizabeth Burrows

Organizations

- Vermont Progressive Party
- Vermont State Employees' Association (co-endorsement with Dube and White)
Chris Dube

Organizations

- Vermont State Employees' Association (co-endorsement with Burrows and White)
Joe Major

Organizations

- Sierra Club Vermont (co-endorsement with White)
- Vermont Conservation Voters (co-endorsement with White)
Rebecca White

Organizations

- Sierra Club Vermont (co-endorsement with Major)
- Vermont Conservation Voters (co-endorsement with Major)
- Vermont State Employees' Association (co-endorsement with Burrows and Dube)

==== Results ====
Windsor Senate district Democratic primary election, 2026
Party	Candidate	Votes	%
Democratic	Rebecca White (incumbent)	6,267	26.67
Democratic	Joe Major (incumbent)	4,610	19.62
Democratic	Elizabeth Burrows	3,846	16.76
Democratic	Heather Chase	3,700	15.75
Democratic	Ben Brickner	3,551	15.11
Democratic	Chris Dube	1,414	6.02
Write-in		95	0.40
Total votes		23,495	100.0

=== Republican primary ===
==== Declared ====
- Jonathan Gleason, ski instructor and nominee for this district in 2024
- Andrea Murray, member of the Weathersfield Development Review Board and nominee for this district in 2024
- Jack Williams, retired quality assurance professional and nominee for this district in 2016, 2018, 2020, and 2024

==== Results ====
Windsor Senate district Republican primary election, 2026
Party	Candidate	Votes	%
Republican	Andrea Murray	1,531	35.56
Republican	Jack Williams	1,390	32.28
Republican	Jonathan Gleason	1,294	30.05
Write-in		71	1.65
Total votes		4,306	100.0

=== Independents ===
==== Declared ====
- Joe Izzo

=== General election ===
==== Results ====
Windsor Senate district general election, 2026
Party	Candidate	Votes	%
Democratic	Rebecca White (incumbent)		
Democratic	Joe Major (incumbent)		
Democratic	Elizabeth Burrows		
Republican	Jonathan Gleason		
Independent	Joe Izzo		
Republican	Andrea Murray		
Republican	Jack Williams		
Write-in			
Total votes			100.0
Democratic hold			
Democratic hold			
Democratic hold			
