= Christopher A. Bray =

American businessman and politician from Vermont (born 1955)

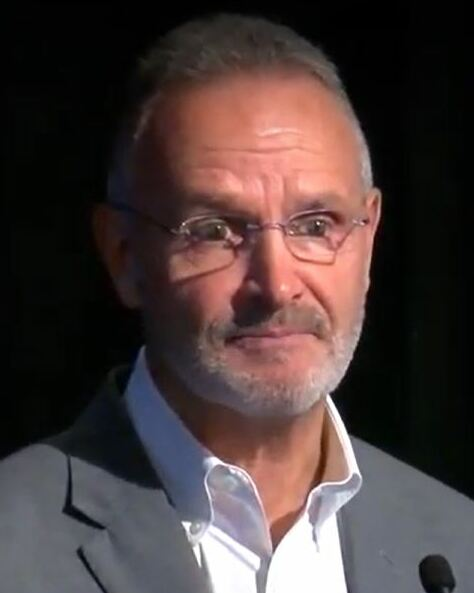
- Bray in 2019

Member of the Vermont Senate from the Addison district
- In office January 9, 2013 – January 8, 2025 Serving with Claire Ayer (2013-2019); Ruth Hardy (2019-2025)
- Preceded by: Harold Giard
- Succeeded by: Steven Heffernan

Member of the Vermont House of Representatives from the Addison-5 district
- In office January 2007 – January 2011
- Preceded by: Harvey T. Smith
- Succeeded by: Harvey T. Smith

Personal details
- Born: June 29, 1955 (age 71) New Britain, Connecticut
- Party: Democratic
- Spouse: Susan Beth Raber (m. 1981-2001)
- Children: 2
- Education: University of Vermont
- Profession: Writer; Editor

Christopher A. Bray (born June 29, 1955) is an American businessman and politician from Vermont. A Democrat, he served in the Vermont House of Representatives from 2007 to 2011. From 2013 to 2025, he represented the Addison District in the Vermont Senate, leaving office after losing re-election in 2024 to Republican Steven Heffernan.

== Early life ==
Christopher Austin Bray was born in New Britain, Connecticut on June 29, 1955, a son of Dr. George H. Bray and Gertrude (Austin) Bray. He attended the University of Vermont (UVM), from which he graduated in 1977 with a Bachelor of Arts degree in Zoology. He received a Master of Arts degree in English from UVM in 1991. His post-graduate work includes studies with Nobel Laureate Leon N. Cooper at Brown University; Lincoln College, Oxford; and the Bread Loaf Writers' Conference at Middlebury College. He enrolled in the Master of Energy and Regulatory Law program at Vermont Law School.

== Career ==
Bray was employed as a product development specialist at corporations including National Life of Vermont, IBM, Intel, and Apple Inc. before founding his own business. In addition, he taught English at UVM for four years. He is the owner of Common Ground Communications, which provides writing, editing and document production services to the book publishing industry and makers of technical products. Among the projects on which Bray worked was editing and publishing the autobiography of former governor Jim Douglas, 2014's The Vermont Way.

Bray's civic and local government experience includes the board of directors of the United Way of Addison County, Middlebury Rotary Club, secretary of the Vermont Milk Commission, chairman of the Vermont Rural Economic Development Working Group, Vermont Forestry Study Group, National Conference of State Legislatures Agriculture & Energy Committee, New Haven justice of the peace, and president of the Middlebury Area Land Trust.

== Vermont House of Representatives ==
In 2006, Bray graduated from the Snelling Center's Vermont Leadership Institute. A Democrat, he was elected to the Vermont House of Representatives from the Addison 5 district in 2006 and reelected in 2008. He served from January 2007 to January 2011 and was a member of the Agriculture Committee. He was a lead sponsor of Vermont's Farm to Plate Program and the Biomass Energy Development Working Group, of which he was co-chairman until 2011.

Bray was elected to the University of Vermont board of trustees in 2009 and served until 2015. In 2009, he received the Vermont Natural Resource Council's Legislative Leadership Award. In 2010, received the Council of State Governments Henry Wolcott Toll Fellowship. In 2012, he was appointed to the Vermont Supreme Court's Professional Responsibility Program.

In 2010, Bray was a candidate for the Democratic nomination for lieutenant governor. He lost the August primary to fellow Representative Steve Howard, who lost the general election to the Republican nominee, Phil Scott.

== Vermont Senate ==
In 2012, incumbent Democrat Harold W. Giard did not run for reelection to the Vermont Senate from the two-member at-large Addison County District. Bray was a candidate for one of the two Democratic nominations, as was incumbent Claire D. Ayer, and they were nominated without opposition. There were no Republican candidates in the November general election, and Bray and Ayer defeated independent Robert Wagner. Bray's Senate term started in January 2013. As of 2023, his committee assignments included the Senate Committee on Finance and the Senate Committee on Natural Resources and Energy, which he chaired since 2015. He also served as chairman of the legislature's Joint Energy Committee, the Committee on Administrative Rules, the Legislative Study Committee on Wetlands, the Single-Use Products Working Group, and the Joint Carbon Emissions Reduction Committee. In 2024, he lost his reelection campaign.

Bray's notable legislative work includes the Farm to Plate Program (2009); the Strategic Workforce Development Act (Act 81, 2013); the Vermont Clean Water Act (Act 64, 2015); the Vermont Renewable Energy Standard (Act 56, 2015); the Energy Siting Act (Act 176, 2016); the Single-Use Products [Plastic Bag Ban, etc.] Act (Act 69, 2019); the Regulation of PFAS Chemicals in Drinking Water (Act 21, 2019); the Regulation of Toxics and Hazardous Materials (Act 75, 2019); the Energy Efficiency Modernization Act (Act 151, 2020); the Weatherization for All Program (S.284, 2022); and the Affordable Heat Act (S.5, 2023).

Bray's previous Senate committee assignments included Education, Economic Development, Housing and General Affairs, Finance, the Joint Committee on Judicial Rules, and chairman of Natural Resources and Energy and the Legislative Information Technology Committee.

== Family ==
In 1981, Bray married Susan Beth Raber. They are the parents of two children, Benjamin and Kaitlin, and divorced in 2001.

== Sources ==
=== Internet ===
- "Vermont Marriage Records, 1909-2008, Entry for Christopher Austin Bray and Susan Beth Raber". Ancestry.com. Lehi, UT: Ancestry.com, LLC. July 18, 1981.
- "Vermont Birth Records, 1909-2008, Entry for Benjamin Bray". Ancestry.com. Lehi, UT: Ancestry.com, LLC. November 1, 1983.
- "Vermont Birth Records, 1909-2008, Entry for Kaitlin Bray". Ancestry.com. Lehi, UT: Ancestry.com, LLC. March 18, 1986.
- "Vermont Divorce Index, 1925-2003, Entry for Christopher Austin Bray and Susan Beth Raber". Ancestry.com. Lehi, UT: Ancestry.com, LLC. May 23, 2001.
- "Biography, Senator Christopher Bray". legislature.vermont.gov. Montpelier, VT: Vermont General Assembly. 2013.
- "Biography, Senator Christopher Bray". legislature.vermont.gov. Montpelier, VT: Vermont General Assembly. 2015.
- "Biography, Senator Christopher Bray". legislature.vermont.gov. Montpelier, VT: Vermont General Assembly. 2017.
- "Biography, Senator Christopher Bray". legislature.vermont.gov. Montpelier, VT: Vermont General Assembly. 2019.
- "Senator Christopher Bray". legislature.vermont.gov. Montpelier, VT: Vermont General Assembly.

=== Newspapers ===
- "Obituary, Dr. George Henry Bray". Hartford Courant. Hartford, CT. May 23, 2010. p. B2 – via Newspapers.com.
- "In Profile: Bray pushes for big ideas in lite gov race". VT Digger. Montpelier, VT. August 6, 2010.
- Remsen, Nancy (August 25, 2010). "Howard, Scott run for lt. gov". Burlington Free Press. Burlington, VT. p. 1B – via Newspapers.com.
- "Governor, lieutenant governor votes certified". Burlington Free Press. Burlington, VT. November 10, 2010. p. 1B – via Newspapers.com.
- Flowers, John (June 17, 2012). "Ayer, Bray and Wagner file; GOP takes pass on Senate". Addison County Independent. Middlebury, VT.
- "Elections return incumbents to capitol". Addison County Independent. Middlebury, VT. January 7, 2013. p. 25 – via ISSUU.com.
- Hallenbeck, Terri (March 30, 2016). "Dogged Pursuit: Can Sen. Chris Bray Solve Vermont's Siting Problem?". Seven Days. Burlington, VT.
