= Seth Bongartz =

American politician (born 1954)

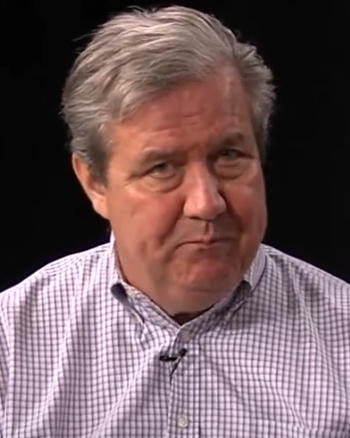
- Bongartz in 2019

Member of the Vermont Senate
- Incumbent
- Assumed office January 8, 2025 Serving with Robert Plunkett
- Preceded by: Dick Sears; Brian Campion
- Constituency: Bennington

Member of the Vermont House of Representatives
- In office January 5, 2021 – January 7, 2025 Serving with Kathleen James
- Preceded by: Cynthia Browning
- Succeeded by: Robert Hunter
- Constituency: Bennington 4

Member of the Vermont Senate
- In office January 7, 1987 – January 3, 1989 Serving with Harvey D. Carter Jr.
- Preceded by: Jane Gardner
- Succeeded by: Mary Ann Carlson, John Page
- Constituency: Bennington district

Member of the Vermont House of Representatives
- In office January 7, 1981 – January 9, 1985 Serving with Stanley S. Hinckley
- Preceded by: Stanley S. Hinckley, W. Michael Nawrath
- Succeeded by: Robert J. Stannard, Clifford Harwood (Bennington-Rutland 2)
- Constituency: Bennington 1

Personal details
- Born: September 23, 1954 (age 72) Manchester, Vermont, US
- Party: Democratic
- Spouse: Christine Evelti
- Children: 1
- Education: Skidmore College; Case Western Reserve University School of Law

Seth Bongartz (born 23 September 1954) is an American politician and a member of the Democratic Party who has served in the Vermont Senate since 2025. His previous service in the state legislature includes the Vermont House of Representatives from 1981 to 1985, the Vermont Senate from 1987 to 1989, and the Vermont House from 2021 to 2025.

== Biography ==
Seth B. Bongartz was born in Manchester, Vermont on 23 September 1954 and is a lifelong resident of Manchester. He graduated from Burr and Burton Academy in 1972 and received his Bachelor of Arts degree from Skidmore College in 1977. He served on the Manchester Zoning Board of Adjustment from 1977 to 1984 and was a member of the board of directors of the Northshire Day School from 1980 to 1983. He served on the board of the Vermont chapter of the Nature Conservancy from 1982 to 1984. Originally a Republican, in 1980, he was elected to the Vermont House of Representatives; he was reelected in 1982 and served from 1981 to 1985. While serving in the state house, he met Christine Evelti, the daughter of fellow legislator Mary Evelti; they married in 1987 and are the parents of a son.

In 1984, Bongartz began attendance at Case Western Reserve University School of Law; he graduated in 1987, attained admission to the bar, and began a practice in Manchester. In 1986 he was elected to the Vermont Senate as a Democrat, and he served one term, 1987 to 1989. In 1990, he was appointed to the board of directors of Vermont Blue Cross; he served until 2004, and was the board's chair from 2001 to 2004.

Bongartz practiced law until 2001, when he became president of Hildene, The Lincoln Family Home in Manchester. He held this position until retiring in 2019, and was credited with transforming Hildene from a small home museum into a nationally known cultural heritage site of more than 400 acres. He retired at the end of 2019 and became a principal in Gubb & Bongartz, a consulting firm that aids nonprofit organizations with strategic planning, fundraising, and other initiatives.

A longtime board of trustees member of Burr and Burton Academy, Bongartz served as the board's chair for 15 years. He served on the board of the Ottaqueechee Land Trust and was a founder of the Northshire Community Land Trust, of which he served as board chair. Bongartz was affiliated for more than 20 years with Grow America, a nonprofit that works to expand economic opportunity nationwide.

In 2020, Bongartz was again elected to the Vermont House of Representatives; he was reelected in 2022 and served from 2021 to 2025. In 2024 he was elected to the Vermont Senate. During this senate term, Bongartz's committee assignments included chair of the Education Committee, and member of the Natural Resources and Energy Committee, the Sexual Harassment Prevention Panel, and the Building Energy Code Working Group. In addition, he was appointed vice chair of the Legislative Committee on Administrative Rules (LCAR).
