= Rob Plunkett =

Vermont attorney and politician (b. 1975)

Robert Plunkett
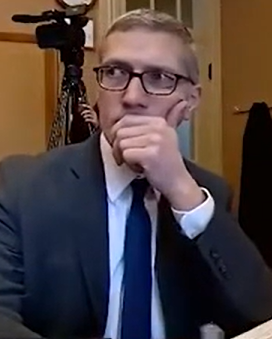
- Plunkett in 2025

Member of the Vermont Senate
- Incumbent
- Assumed office 9 January 2025 Serving with Seth Bongartz
- Preceded by: Brian Campion; Dick Sears
- Constituency: Bennington district

Personal details
- Born: December 1, 1975 (age 50) Troy, New York, US
- Party: Democratic
- Spouse: Genevieve Freeman (div.)
- Children: 2
- Education: Amherst College; Brooklyn Law School
- Profession: Attorney

Robert F. Plunkett (born 1 December 1975) is an American attorney and politician from Bennington, Vermont. A graduate of Amherst College and Brooklyn Law School, he has served for several years as a deputy state's attorney for Bennington County. In 2024, he was elected to one of two at-large Vermont Senate seats that represent the Bennington district.

== Biography ==
Robert Plunkett was born in Troy, New York on 1 December 1975, a son of Robert W. Plunkett and Eileen (Kinney) Plunkett. He was raised and educated in Bennington, Vermont and is a 1993 graduate of Mount Anthony Union High School. Plunkett received his Bachelor of Arts in political science from Amherst College in 1998, then spent a year in California working for a private investigation firm. He then returned to Bennington, where he worked for several years as a computer programmer at Global-Z International. In 2003, he began attendance at Brooklyn Law School, from which he received his JD in 2006.

After attaining admission to the bar, Plunkett returned to Vermont, where in March 2007 he was appointed a deputy state's attorney for Bennington County. In July 2009, he joined Bennington's Jacobs, McClintock & Palmer-Ellis law firm, but he left in December to resume working as a deputy state's attorney.

In May 2024, incumbent Brian Campion indicated that he would not run for reelection to the Vermont Senate. In June 2024, Dick Sears, the incumbent in the Bennington district's other seat, died following a long illness. Seth Bongartz, a former state senator, was a successful candidate for one of the two Democratic nominations. Because Sears's name was already on the ballot, Plunkett ran as a write-in candidate for the other nomination, which he received. Bongartz and Plunkett won the November general election and assumed office in January 2025.
