= John Prchlik =

American football player (1925–2003)

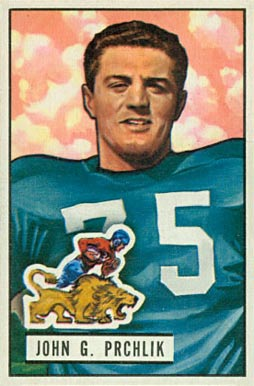
- Prchlik on a 1951 Bowman football card

No. 75
- Positions: Defensive tackle, tackle

Personal information
- Born: July 20, 1925; Cleveland, Ohio, U.S.
- Died: December 31, 2003 (aged 78); Fairfield Glade, Tennessee, U.S.
- Listed height: 6 ft 4 in (1.93 m)
- Listed weight: 234 lb (106 kg)

Career information
- High school: West Tech (Cleveland)
- College: Yale (1943-1944, 1946-1947)
- NFL draft: 1947: 30th round, 277th overall pick

Career history
- Cleveland Browns (1948)*; Detroit Lions (1949–1953)
- * Offseason or practice squad member only

Awards and highlights
- 2× NFL champion (1952, 1953)

Career NFL statistics
- Games played: 59
- Games started: 48
- Fumble recoveries: 1
- Stats at Pro Football Reference

John George Prchlik (July 20, 1925 – December 31, 2003) was a professional American football defensive lineman in the National Football League (NFL).

== Early life ==
Prchlik was born the eldest of four siblings in Cleveland. His brother, Richard, became a politician and professor in Colorado. Raised in a Czech immigrant community, he did not learn English until he went to school. After graduating from Cleveland West Technical High School, he was nominated for an officers training program at Yale University, where he was a classmate of George H. W. Bush and William F. Buckley Jr.

=== College ===
He served as an Ensign on the aircraft carrier, the USS White Plains in the Pacific War in the middle of his college career. After the war ended, he returned to New Haven, Connecticut, where he lettered in football, wrestling. As a college All-American, he played in both the 1948 East West Shrine game and the College All Star game.

== Career ==
After playing college football at Yale, Prchlik was drafted by the Boston Yanks in the 30th round (277th overall) in the 1947 NFL draft. He played five seasons for the Detroit Lions including their 1952 and 1953 Championship seasons and in the 1951 and 1952 seasons was defensive captain. In the off season, he worked towards his law degree and graduated from Wayne State University Law School in 1952. He was an executive at Ford Motor Company for 30 years.

== Personal life ==
Prchlik married his wife, Patricia Hallihan, a local resident in 1949. Prchlik's nephew, Andrew Perchlik, in an environmental activist and member of the Vermont Senate.

Prchlik died December 31, 2003, of pancreatic cancer in Fairfield Glade, Tennessee, at age 78.
