= Ruth Hardy =

American politician (born 1970)

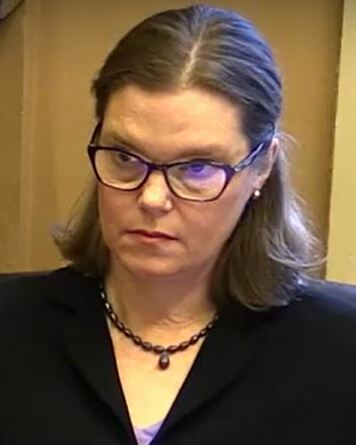
- Hardy in 2020

Member of the Vermont Senate from the Addison district
- Incumbent
- Assumed office January 9, 2019 Serving with Christopher Bray (2019-2025); Steven Heffernan (2025–present)
- Preceded by: Claire Ayer

Personal details
- Born: 1970 (age 55–56) Tompkins County, New York, U.S.
- Party: Democratic
- Spouse: Jason Mittell (m. 1997)
- Children: 3
- Education: Oberlin College; University of Texas at Austin
- Profession: State Senator

Ruth Hardy (born 1970) is an American political figure from East Middlebury, Vermont. A Democrat, she was first elected to the Vermont Senate in 2018.

== Early life ==
Ruth Ellen Hardy was born in the Tompkins County area of New York circa 1970, a daughter of Robert B. Hardy Jr. and Miriam (Smith) Hardy. Robert Hardy (1930-2005) was a graduate of Cornell University and Cornell Law School, and he served for more than thirty years as an Administrative Law Judge for the New York State Department of Labor. Ruth Hardy was raised and educated in Tompkins County and is a 1988 graduate of Dryden High School in Dryden, New York.

Hardy received a Bachelor of Arts degree in government from Oberlin College in 1992 and in 1996 she received a Master of Public Affairs degree from the Lyndon B. Johnson School of Public Affairs at the University of Texas at Austin. She was a fiscal analyst for the Wisconsin Legislative Fiscal Bureau and specialized in education issues. Hardy moved to East Middlebury, Vermont in 2002.

== Career ==
After relocating to Vermont, Hardy served as executive director of the Open Door Clinic in Middlebury, Vermont. In addition, she worked as assistant budget director at Middlebury College, and director of government grants at Planned Parenthood of Northern New England. She also served as executive director of Emerge Vermont, which recruits and trains women to run for public office.

Hardy served three terms on Middlebury-area school boards and was chairwoman of Middlebury's Mary Hogan School Board, co-chairwoman of the Addison Central Supervisory Union Unification Charter Committee, and Chair of the Addison Central School District Finance Committee. She is a graduate of the Snelling Center's Vermont Leadership Institute.

== Vermont Senate ==
In early 2018, incumbent Democrat Claire D. Ayer announced that she would not be a candidate for reelection to the Vermont Senate in the two-member at-large Addison County Senate District. Hardy announced her candidacy in May. In the November general election, Hardy and incumbent Democrat Christopher Bray were the top two finishers.

At the start of her Senate term, Hardy was appointed to the Committees on Education and Agriculture, and was named clerk of the Agriculture Committee. In addition, she was named to the Senate's special panel on sexual harassment and the Joint Committee on Judicial Retention. She has been re-elected three times in 2020, 2022, and 2024. She currently serves on the Finance Committee and Natural Resources and Energy Committee.

== Family ==
In 1997, Hardy married Jason Mittell, professor of Film & Media at Middlebury College. They are the parents of three children.

== Sources ==
=== Newspapers ===
- "Wedding Announcement, Ruth Ellen Hardy-Jason S. Mittell". The Ithaca Journal. Ithaca, NY. October 18, 1997. p. 15 – via Newspapers.com.
- "Empire State Scholarships and Regents Scholarships". The Ithaca Journal. Ithaca, NY. June 2, 1988. p. 4A – via Newspapers.com.
- "Obituary, Robert B. Hardy Jr". The Ithaca Journal. Ithaca, NY. December 22, 2005. p. 15.
- Norton, Kit (November 6, 2018). "Democrat Ruth Hardy claims open Addison Senate seat". VT Digger. Montpelier, VT.
- "Meet the LBJ alumni running for office in 2018". Texas LBJ School. Austin, TX. November 6, 2018.

=== Internet ===
- Bloomer, John H. Jr. (February 21, 2019). "Journal of the Joint Assembly" (PDF). Legislature.vermont.gov. Montpelier, VT: Vermont Joint Assembly. p. 4.
- "Oberlin College – Class of 1992 – 25th Reunion Photo" (PDF). Oberlin.edu. Oberlin, OH: Oberlin College. May 2017. p. 1.
- Hardy, Ruth (May 25, 2018). "Launching My Campaign: Community Organizing & Creating Change". Ruth For Vermont.com. East Middlebury, VT: Ruth Hardy for Vermont Senate.
- "Biography, Senator Ruth Hardy". 2025-2026 Session. Montpelier, VT: Vermont General Assembly. 2025.
