= Nikhil Goyal =

American sociologist

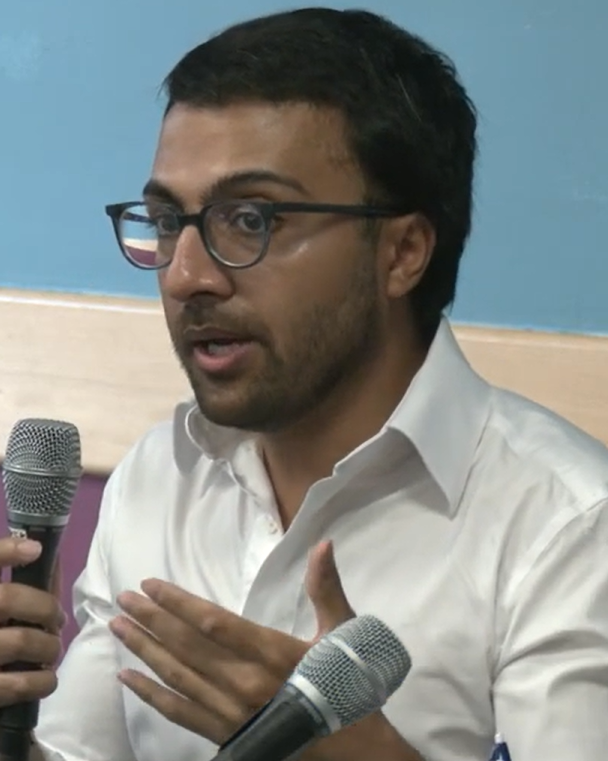
- Goyal in 2026
- Born: 1995 (age 30–31)
- Education: Goddard College (BA), University of Cambridge (MPhil, PhD)
- Occupations: Sociologist, educator, and policymaker
- Notable work: Live to See the Day: Coming of Age in American Poverty
- Political party: Democratic

Nikhil Goyal (born 1995) is an American sociologist, educator, and policymaker. His book Live to See the Day: Coming of Age in American Poverty, a chronicle of three Puerto Rican children who grew up in the poorest neighborhood of Philadelphia during the era of welfare reform, mass incarceration, and educational inequality, was included in The New Yorker's "Best Books of 2023". Goyal has also written for The New York Times, The Wall Street Journal, The Washington Post, and The Nation. For his scholarship, he was elected as a fellow for the New York Institute for the Humanities.

Goyal has taught sociology at the University of Vermont, Wesleyan University, and New York University. His area of expertise has been sociology of education, poverty, incarceration, and social welfare. During the 117th and 118th sessions of Congress, he served as senior policy advisor on education and children on the Senate Committee on the Budget and Senate Committee on Health, Education, Labor, and Pensions under Chairman Senator Bernie Sanders.

Goyal holds a BA from Goddard College and M.Phil and Ph.D from the University of Cambridge. He lives in Vermont.

Goyal is one of three Democratic nominees for Chittenden-Central in the 2026 Vermont Senate election.

== Bibliography ==
- Live to See the Day: Coming of Age in American Poverty. Metropolitan/Macmillan. August 2023.
- Schools on Trial: How Freedom and Creativity Can Fix Our Educational Malpractice. Doubleday/Random House. February 2016.
