= Monique Priestley =

American politician from Vermont

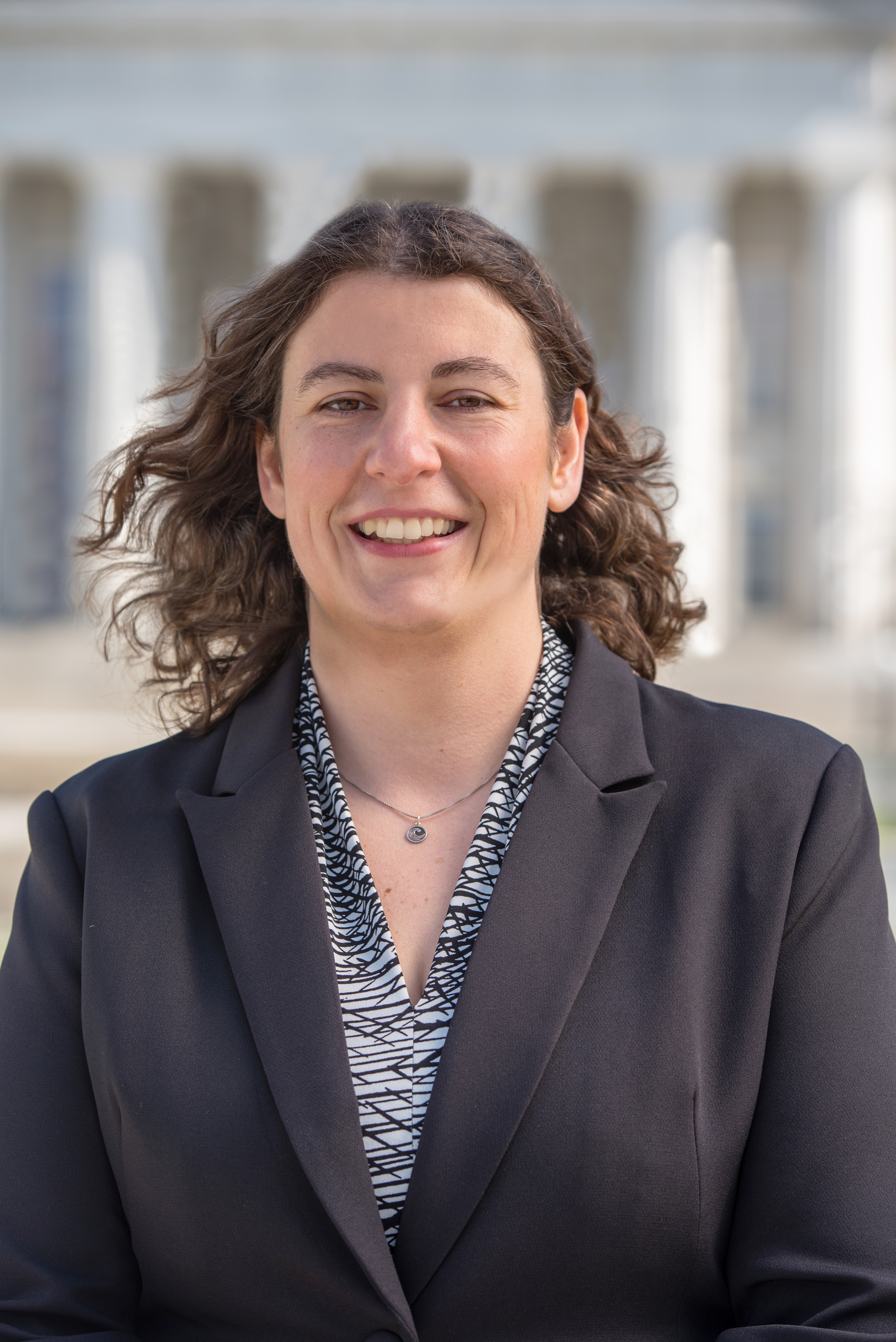

Member of the Vermont House of Representatives from the Orange-2 district
- Incumbent
- Assumed office January 4, 2023
- Preceded by: Sarah Copeland Hanzas

Personal details
- Party: Democratic
- Education: Oxbow High School
- Alma mater: Northern Vermont University; University of Washington

Monique Priestley is an American politician from Vermont. She has been a Democratic member of the Vermont House of Representatives for the Orange-2 District since 2023. In 2026 she was elected to the Vermont Senate.

== Early life and education ==
Priestly was born in Piermont, New Hampshire and moved to Bradford, Vermont as a teenager. She graduated from Northern Vermont University in Lyndon with a Bachelor of Arts in Digital Media and an Associate of Science in Graphic Design, and received a Master of Communication in Digital Media from the University of Washington.

== Career ==
Priestley is executive director of a non-profit community workspace called The Space On Main which she founded in 2017.Priestley worked as the Vermont COVID Business Recovery Project Manager for the Center for Women & Enterprise from 2020 through 2022. She was elected to the Vermont legislature in 2022 and re-elected in 2024.

On October 29, 2025, Priestly announced her intention to run for the Orange County seat in the Vermont Senate in 2026, following the resignation of Senator Larry Hart. She says her campaign will focus on "housing, climate resilience, affordability, economic fairness, and government transparency." She won the Democratic primary race in 2026 against her opponent Rose Lucenti and was elected State Senator in November 2026.
