= Richard Perchlik =

American politician & academic (1928–1988)

Mayor of Greeley, Colorado
- In office 1969–1973
- Preceded by: Dorothy Zabka
- Succeeded by: George W. Hall

Personal details
- Born: April 11, 1928 Cleveland, Ohio, U.S.
- Died: April 24, 1988 (aged 60) Greeley, Colorado, U.S.
- Party: Democratic
- Spouse: Sylvia (Marston) Perchlik
- Relations: John Prchlik (brother)
- Children: 4, including Andrew
- Education: Ohio State University (BBA, MEd); University of Colorado Boulder (EdD)

Military service
- Branch/service: United States Army
- Battles/wars: Korean War

Richard "Dick" A. Perchlik (April 11, 1928 – April 24, 1988) was an American politician and academic. A Democrat, he served as the mayor of Greeley, Colorado from 1969 to 1973.

== Early life and education ==
Perchlik was born in Cleveland, Ohio, the son of Bessie (Kral), and John Prchlik. His siblings included John, Arthur, and Ruth. He attended West Tech High School. He received a bachelor's degree in business from Ohio State University and served in the United States Army as a lieutenant during the Korean War. After an honorable discharge, he attended Harvard University. He went on to receive a master's degree in Education from Ohio State University and a Doctorate in Education from the University of Colorado Boulder. During his studies, he added an 'e' to the spelling of his Czech name.

== Career ==
In 1961, Perchlik became a professor at Colorado State College (now the University of Northern Colorado (UNC). He was the first Chair of the Political Science Department, a post he held for over two decades. He also helped found the UNC Faculty Senate and participated in the university's Educational Planning Service. After his death, the university created a Richard A. Perchlik Political Science scholarship.

Active in the Democratic Party, Perchlik attended several local and state party conventions as a delegate, and was an alternate delegate at the 1972 and 1980 Democratic National Convention. Perchlik served as Chair of Colorado Common Cause from 1973 to 1975. He was a member of the board of directors the state board for Colorado's American Civil Liberties Union and the Colorado Commission on Respect for Law, as well as the National Council on Social Studies.

Perchlik served as mayor from 1969 to 1973. As mayor, he initiated several public works projects. Most iconic of these was Bittersweet Park, which provided flood control to low-income neighborhoods and an asset for the development of an upper-middle-class neighborhood. Also, to make the city's government more accessible, he began broadcasting City Council meetings on local radio.

In 1970, Perchlik ran for the Democratic nomination against incumbent U.S. Representative Wayne N. Aspinall in Colorado's 4th congressional district. Aspinall was a conservative Democrat, while Perchlik ran on a platform that emphasized environmental conservation.

In addition to his academic and political careers, Perchlik was owner and operator of the Sharktooth Ski Area, a local family-oriented recreation area, from 1970 to 1985.

== Personal life ==
While working on his doctoral degree, Perchlik married Sylvia (Marston) Perchlik. They had four children, including Andrew Perchlik, a member of the Vermont Senate.

Perchlik died of cancer in Greeley, Colorado on April 24, 1988.
