= John Morley (Vermont politician) =

American politician from Vermont

Member of the Vermont Senate from the Orleans district
- Incumbent
- Assumed office December 5, 2025
- Preceded by: Samuel Douglass

Member of the Vermont House of Representatives Orleans/Caledonia 1
- In office 2005–2011 Serving with John S. Rodgers
- Preceded by: David Bolduc, John S. Rodgers
- Succeeded by: Vicki Strong, Samuel Young

Personal details
- Born: May 6, 1970 (age 56) Newport, Vermont, U.S.
- Party: Republican
- Spouse: Jodi
- Education: University of Vermont (BS)
- Occupation: First class lineman Village manager

John Morley (born May 6, 1970) is a Republican politician from Vermont. He serves in the Vermont Senate, representing the Orleans District since 2025. He previously served in the Vermont House of Representatives, representing the Orleans-Caledonia-1 Representative District.

== Biography ==
Morley was born in Newport, Vermont and graduated from the University of Vermont with a Bachelor of Science in 1993. He was Chairman of the Vermont Public Power Supply Authority, and has been the Village Manager of Orleans, Vermont since 1993.

He served as a Representative in the Vermont House of Representatives from 2005 to 2011. While in the State House, Morley served on the Appropriations and Commerce Committees. In September 2012, Morley was elected President of the Northeastern Vermont Development Association.

In December 2025, Morley was appointed to the Vermont Senate to succeed resigned senator Samuel Douglass.

Morley and his wife Jodi have two children. They live in Orleans, Vermont.
