= Brian Campion (politician) =

American politician from Vermont

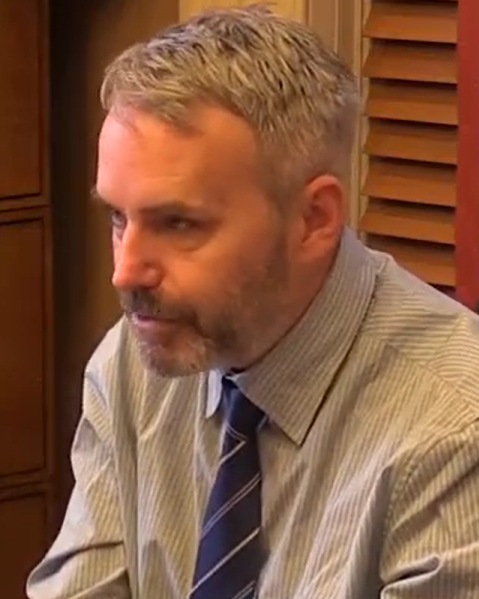
- Campion in 2023

Member of the Vermont Senate from the Bennington district
- In office January 7, 2015 – January 8, 2025 Serving with Dick Sears
- Preceded by: Robert Hartwell
- Succeeded by: Rob Plunkett, Seth Bongartz

Member of the Vermont House of Representatives from the Bennington 2-1 district
- In office January 5, 2011 – January 7, 2015
- Preceded by: Joseph Krawczyk Jr.
- Succeeded by: Rachael Fields

Personal details
- Born: December 11, 1970 (age 55) Albany, New York, U.S.
- Party: Democratic
- Profession: Educator / College Administration
- Brian Campion's voice Brian Campion introducing himself in a meeting of the Senate Agricultural committee Recorded February 21, 2024

Brian Campion (born December 11, 1970) is a Vermont educator and politician. As a member of the Democratic Party, he represented Bennington in the Vermont Senate, where he served as a member of the Senate Committee on Natural Resources and Energy, and was Chair of the Senate Committee on Education.

In addition to his work as a legislator, Campion is the Director of Public Policy Programs for the Center for the Advancement of Public Action (CAPA) at Bennington College where he facilitates all programs connected to state and federal policy. He has organized and led talk series on various public policy issues including contemporary challenges to American Democracy.

Campion ran for state representative in 2010, one of three candidates seeking two seats in the Bennington-2-1 district. Both incumbent state representatives, Democrat Tim Corcoran II and Republican Joseph Krawczyk Jr., ran for reelection and had endorsed each other. In the general election, Campion won a final tally of 1,461 votes, finishing behind Corcoran's 1,965 but ahead of Krawczyk's 1,120. He was therefore elected and took office on January 5, 2011. He was reelected to his seat in 2012, and was then elected to the Vermont Senate in 2014, where he served until January 2025.

In May 2024, Campion announced that he would not be seeking reelection, ultimately endorsing Seth Bongartz and Rob Plunkett in their campaigns for the open senate seats, who upon successful election assumed office on January 8, 2025.
