= Dave Wolk =

American politician

Dave Wolk is an American politician from the state of Vermont. He has served as a Democratic member of the Vermont Senate for the Rutland County district from 1988 to 1992, president of Castleton University and Rutland High School, superintendent of Rutland City Public Schools, and as a Rutland County assistant judge. He was the Democratic nominee for Lieutenant Governor of Vermont in 1992, losing to Republican Barbara Snelling in the general election. He is currently running for his old state senate seat as an independent.
