= Samuel Douglass (politician) =

American politician (born 1998)

Member of the Vermont Senate from the Orleans district
- In office January 8, 2025 – October 22, 2025
- Preceded by: Robert A. Starr
- Succeeded by: John Morley

Personal details
- Born: Samuel A. Douglass; 1998 (age 27–28) Newport, Vermont, U.S.
- Party: Republican
- Spouse: Brianna Jennifer Morgan
- Education: Northern Vermont University (BA)
- Occupation: Farmer; Real estate agent

Samuel A. Douglass (born 1998) is an American politician from Vermont. A Republican, he was elected in 2024 to represent the Orleans district in the Vermont Senate, succeeding longtime incumbent Robert A. Starr. He served from January 2025 until his resignation in October 2025. A graduate of Vermont State University's Johnson campus, Douglass has worked as a farmer and real estate agent.

In October 2025, Politico reported that Douglass and his wife had made racist and antisemitic comments in a leaked group chat with fellow high-ranking Young Republicans leaders, who also expressed support for Nazism, rape, and white supremacy. Members of the Vermont Republican Party, including Governor Phil Scott, called on Douglass to immediately resign. Douglass announced his resignation on October 17, and submitted his formal resignation on October 22.

== Biography ==
Samuel Adam Douglass was born in Newport, Vermont, in 1998, the son of Richard Douglass and Kathlene (Beaudry) Douglass. He was raised in Jay and North Troy and attended North Troy Elementary School and North Country Union Junior High School before graduating from Newport's North Country Union High School. In 2021, Douglass received his Bachelor of Arts degree in history from Northern Vermont University in Johnson (now Vermont State University).

Douglass has worked as a crisis interventionist for Lamoille County Mental Health Services and a real estate agent with Great Northern Land Company in Jay. In addition, he and his wife operate a farm on which they raise goats, chickens, ducks, and bees, and grow flowers, plant starts, herbs, and tea. Douglass has served as a lister for the town of Troy and volunteers for the Northeast Kingdom Council on Aging's Meals on Wheels program.

A Republican, Douglass has served as chairman of the Vermont Young Republicans. In addition, he has served as chairman of the Orleans County Republican Committee. In 2022, he was the unsuccessful Republican nominee for the Vermont Senate's Orleans district, losing to incumbent Robert A. Starr, who retired in 2024. Douglass was again the Republican nominee, and he defeated Democratic candidate Katherine Sims in the general election.

After assuming office in January 2025, Douglass was assigned to the committees on Health and Welfare and Institutions, and was named clerk of each. He was also appointed to the senate's Sexual Harassment Prevention Panel, the Canvassing Committee, and the Human Services and Educational Facilities Grant Advisory Committee. February 2025 reporting by the Hardwick Gazette highlighted discrepancies between the Douglass campaign's reported 2024 expenditures and its actual spending on mailers and other activities.

=== Young Republican Leaders group chat leak ===
On October 14, 2025, Politico reported on racist and antisemitic statements made by Douglass and his wife Brianna in a text message group chat with fellow prominent members of Young Republicans groups in New York, Vermont, Arizona, and Kansas. Douglass was the only elected official in the group chat. The group chat contained messages praising Nazis, rape, and white supremacy, and speaking of the government's alleged efforts to suppress documents related to Jeffrey Epstein's sex crimes. In response to a member questioning whether a woman was Indian, Douglass wrote: "She just didn't bathe often." When Douglass described how a Jewish colleague may have made a procedural error about the number of Maryland delegates allowed at the national convention, Brianna replied: "I was about to say you're giving nationals to [sic] much credit and expecting the Jew to be honest." Douglass did not respond to Politico requests for comment about the incident.

Members of the Vermont Republican Party, including Governor Phil Scott, called on Douglass to resign, with Scott saying in a statement that his "vile, racist, bigoted, and antisemitic dialogue that has been reported is deeply disturbing". Scott also called for Douglass to leave the Republican Party. On October 15, Douglass was removed from his duties with the Vermont Republican Party "until the matter is resolved", according to chair of the Vermont Republican Party, Paul Dame. Later that day, "the executive committee of the Vermont Republican Party issued an additional statement late Wednesday, retracting Dame's statement and calling for Douglass' immediate resignation". Douglass announced his resignation on October 17, 2025. His resignation was supposed to go into effect on October 20, but as of October 21, he had still not officially resigned. He submitted his formal resignation on October 22.

In his resignation announcement, he stated, "Offense was taken and people were hurt, so I will mend bridges to the best of my ability ... Since the story broke, I have reached out to the majority of my Jewish and BIPOC friends and colleagues to ensure that they can be honest and upfront with me, and I know that as a young person I have a duty to set a good example for others." Brianna Douglass also resigned from her position as the Vermont Young Republican's national committee member.

In February 2026, a story on the Vermont Legislature's school redistricting effort appeared under Douglass's byline on the Vermont Daily Chronicle, a conservative news website. According to publisher and editor Guy Page, Douglass began writing for the Chronicle on a per-story basis, with topics of future pieces to be determined.
