= John Benson (Vermont politician) =

American politician

Member of the Vermont Senate from the Orange County district
- Incumbent
- Assumed office January 2, 2026
- Preceded by: Larry Hart

Personal details
- Party: Republican

John Benson is an American politician and a member of the Republican Party from Brookfield, Vermont.

== Early life and education ==
Benson graduated from Vermont Technical College (now VTSU) in 1973. He became a licensed engineer in Vermont in 1993. He is married and has two children.

== Career ==
Benson is a career civil engineer, working as managing partner at the engineering firm DuBois & King. He was named Vermont's Engineer of the Year in 2018. He managed the Bennington Bypass project. He is a past-president of the Vermont Society of Engineers, and served on its board for over ten years.

Benson serves as chair of the Brookfield Selectboard and retired from firefighting in 2015 after 35 years of being a volunteer firefighter, 28 years of that as fire chief.

== State senator ==
Benson represents the Orange County district in the Vermont Senate. He was appointed by Governor Phil Scott on January 2 to replace Larry Hart who resigned in 2025. He serves on the Senate Committee on Health and Welfare and the Senate Committee on Institutions.
