= Claire D. Ayer =

American politician (born 1948)

Member of the Vermont Senate from the Addison district
- In office 2003–2019
- Succeeded by: Ruth Hardy

Personal details
- Born: September 21, 1948 (age 77) Quincy, Massachusetts
- Party: Democratic
- Spouse: Alan
- Education: Jeanne Mance School of Nursing, Middlebury College
- Profession: nurse

Claire D. Ayer (born September 21, 1948) is a Democratic former member of the Vermont State Senate, representing the two-member at-large Addison Senate District.

Claire D. Ayer was first elected to the Vermont State Senate in 2002, and reelected in 2004, 2006, 2008, 2010, 2012, 2014 and 2016. Ayer served as assistant majority leader of the Vermont Senate, and previously served as majority whip. She is also the current chairperson of the Senate Committee on Health and Welfare. She did not run for reelection in 2018, and was succeeded by Ruth Hardy.

== Biography ==
Ayer was born September 21, 1948, in Quincy, Massachusetts, and spent her childhood in Charlotte, Vermont. After receiving her high school education at Champlain Valley Union High School in Hinesburg, she attended the Jeanne Mance School of Nursing in Burlington, becoming a registered nurse in 1969. She also received a B.A. in environmental studies from Middlebury College in 1992.

She was married to a physician, Dr. Alan Ayer, who died in 2015. They settled in Weybridge, Vermont in 1979, after spending four years in the Air Force. Ayer has three adult children and currently lives in Addison, Vermont.

Ayer works as a nurse for an OB-GYN in Middlebury, Vermont.

== Public life ==
Ayer has served in the following positions:

- Member Board of Directors: Otter Creek Natural Resources Conservation District (1992 - ).
- Member Vermont State Senate (2003 - ).
- Member Board of Trustees, University of Vermont (2005 - ).
- Member Weybridge School Board.
- Member of the board of the Middlebury Area Land Trust.
- Member of the Weybridge Conservation Commission.
- Member of the Lake Champlain Sea Grant Committee.

During the 2015–2016 Legislative Session, Claire D. Ayer was one of three sponsors of Senate Bill S.31, "An act relating to possession and transfer of firearms", which sought to require background checks on substantially all firearm sales, and to prohibit the sale of firearms to persons convicted of certain violent crimes.

== See also ==
- Members of the Vermont Senate, 2005-2006 session
- Members of the Vermont Senate, 2007-2008 session
