= Andrew Perchlik =

American politician (born 1968)

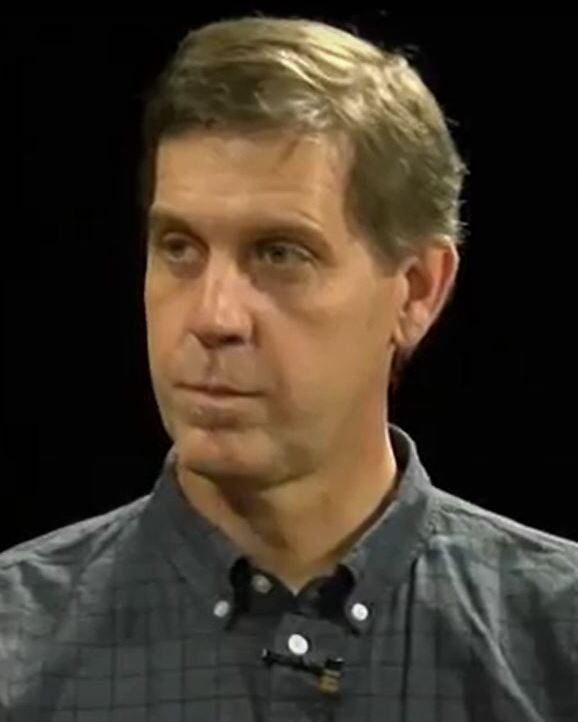
- Perchlik in 2018

Member of the Vermont Senate from the Washington District
- Incumbent
- Assumed office January 2019 Serving with Ann Cummings, Anthony Pollina (until 2023), Anne Watson (since 2023)
- Preceded by: Francis K. Brooks, Ann Cummings, Anthony Pollina

Personal details
- Born: June 3, 1968 (age 58) Greeley, Colorado, U.S.
- Party: Democratic
- Other political affiliations: Progressive
- Spouse: Marianne Donahue (m. 1997)
- Relations: Richard Perchlik (father); John Prchlik (uncle)
- Children: 3
- Education: University of Northern Colorado (BS)
- Occupation: Renewable energy executive and consultant

Andrew John Perchlik (born June 3, 1968) is an American activist and politician from Vermont. A Democrat, in 2018 he was elected to the Vermont Senate from the three-member at-large Washington County Senate District.

== Early life and education ==
Perchlik was born in Greeley, Colorado on June 3, 1968, a son of Richard Perchlik and Sylvia (Marston) Perchlik. His father was a professor of political science at Colorado State College (now the University of Northern Colorado). He also served as mayor of Greeley and owned and operated the Sharktooth Ski Area. Andrew Perchlik and his three siblings were raised in Greeley.

Perchlik attended an on-campus laboratory school at the University of Northern Colorado from Kindergarten through 12th grade. He then attended the university, from which he received a Bachelor of Science degree in environmental politics.

== Career ==
Perchlik joined the Peace Corps after college and served in Panama. He became a resident of Vermont in 1991 as a VISTA volunteer, and worked on home weatherization and fuel assistance projects in Addison County. He subsequently returned to Colorado, and in 1995 he moved back to Vermont, which became his permanent residence. His family resided in Hubbardton and Randolph Center before moving to Marshfield in 1998. In 2017, they moved from Marshfield to Montpelier.

A recognized expert in the field of sustainable energy, Perchlik was the director of Vermont's Clean Energy Development Fund, founding executive director of Renewable Energy Vermont, a member of the Solar Rating Certification Corporation board of directors, and member of the International Code Council's Renewable Energy Advisory Council.

=== Vermont Senate ===
In 2018, incumbent Francis K. Brooks announced that he would not to run for reelection to the Vermont Senate. Perchlik was one of several candidates for the three Democratic nominations in the at-large Washington County Senate District. In the August primary, Perchlik and incumbents Ann Cummings and Anthony Pollina were nominated. Perchlik and Pollina were also nominated by the Vermont Progressive Party. In the November general election, Cummings, Pollina, and Perchlik were the top three finishers, defeating Republicans Ken Alger, Dwayne Tucker, and Chris S. Bradley, and independent Barry Wadle.

In his first term, Perchlik was appointed to the Senate's Education and Transportation committees. In addition, he served on the Barre Granite and Ethnic Culture Museum Steering Committee, the Committee to Oversee Planning and Design of the Vermont State House, and the New England Board of Higher Education Canvassing Committee.

In 2020, Perchlik was a candidate for reelection. In the November general election, Perchlik, Cummings, and Pollina were elected over Republicans Dwayne Tucker, Dawnmarie Tomasi, and Ken Alger. Pollina did not run for reelection in 2022, and Perchlik, Cummings and Anne Watson were elected. Perchlik, Cummings, and Watson were reelected in 2024.

== Personal life ==
In 1997, Perchlik married Marianne Donahue. They have three children. Perchlik's uncle, John Prchlik, was a professional football player for the Detroit Lions from 1949 to 1953 and a labor relations executive at Ford Motor Company.

== Sources ==
=== Internet ===
- "Vermont Marriage Records, 1909-2008, Entry for Andrew John Perchlik and Marianne K. Donahue". Ancestry.com. Lehi, UT: Ancestry.com, LLC. June 18, 1997.
- "Obituary, Ruth Marie Prebel (1932-2015)". Chambers Funeral.com. Cleveland, OH: Chambers Funeral Homes, Inc. 2015.
- "Biography, Senator Andrew Perchlik". legislature.vermont.gov. Montpelier, VT: Vermont General Assembly. 2019.
- "2022 Nov 8, General Election, State Senate District Washington". Election Results Archive. Montpelier, Vermont: Elections Division, Vermont Secretary of State. 2022.
- "2024 Nov 5, General Election, State Senate District Washington". Election Results Archive. Montpelier, Vermont: Elections Division, Vermont Secretary of State. 2024.

=== Newspapers ===
- "Prchlik dead at 78". The News Herald. Port Clinton, OH. Associated Press. January 9, 2004. p. B3 – via Newspapers.com.
- Hewitt, Elizabeth (May 31, 2018). "Francis Brooks to retire from state Senate". VT Digger. Montpelier, VT.
- Silberman, Alexandre (August 15, 2018). "Perchlik gains third Senate spot for Washington County". VT Digger. Montpelier, VT.
- "Three Democrats win state Senate seats". Stowe Today. Stowe, VT. November 8, 2018.
- Delaney, Anne (February 6, 2019). "Greeley's Sharktooth Ski Area lives on through history, Facebook page". The Greeley Tribune. Greeley, CO.
