= Ashley Bartley =

American politician from Vermont

Member of the Vermont House of Representatives from the Franklin 1 district
- Incumbent
- Assumed office January 4, 2023 Serving with Carolyn Whitney Branagan
- Preceded by: Carl Rosenquist

Personal details
- Party: Republican
- Education: Champlain Valley Union High School
- Alma mater: University of Vermont

Ashley Bartley is an American politician from Vermont. She has been a Republican member of the Vermont House of Representatives for the Franklin-1 District, which includes all of Fairfax and a majority of Georgia, Vermont since 2023.

== Political opinions ==
Ashley Bartley has been at the forefront of the Housing crisis conversation in Vermont. She was a lead sponsor of a tri-partisan housing initiative in 2024. She served on the House Committee on General & Housing since 2023. In 2025, she was appointed Vice-Chair of the House Committee on General & Housing. She was appointed to the Basic Needs Budget Technical Advisory Committee in 2023 and the Agricultural Worker Labor and Employment Laws Study Committee in 2024.

In the 2024 United States presidential election, she was a Republican who opposed the Donald Trump 2024 presidential campaign. Bartley endorsed the Nikki Haley campaign.

During the race for Vermont Speaker of the House, Ashley was the lone Republican who publicly voiced support for the Incumbent Speaker of the House Jill Krowinski.
