= Orleans (Vermont Senate district) =

One of 13 Vermont Senate districts

Coordinates: 44.70°N 73.32°W

The Orleans district is one of 16 districts of the Vermont Senate. The current district plan is included in the redistricting and reapportionment plan developed by the Vermont General Assembly following the 2020 U.S. census, which applies to legislatures elected in 2022, 2024, 2026, 2028, and 2030.

The Orleans district includes most of Orleans County, the Towns of Burke, Newark, Sheffield and Sutton from Caledonia County, and the Town of Montgomery from Franklin County.

== District senators ==
As of 2023

- Robert Starr, Democratic

As of 2025

- Samuel Douglass, Republican

== Towns in the Orleans district ==
=== Caledonia County ===
- Burke
- Newark
- Sheffield
- Sutton

=== Franklin County ===
- Montgomery

=== Orleans County ===
- Albany
- Barton
- Brownington
- Charleston
- Coventry
- Craftsbury
- Glover
- Greensboro
- Irasburg
- Jay
- Lowell
- Newport (town)
- Troy
- Westfield
- Westmore

== See also ==
- Essex-Orleans (Vermont Senate district)
- Vermont Senate
