= Robert LaClair =

American politician and member of the Vermont State House of Representatives

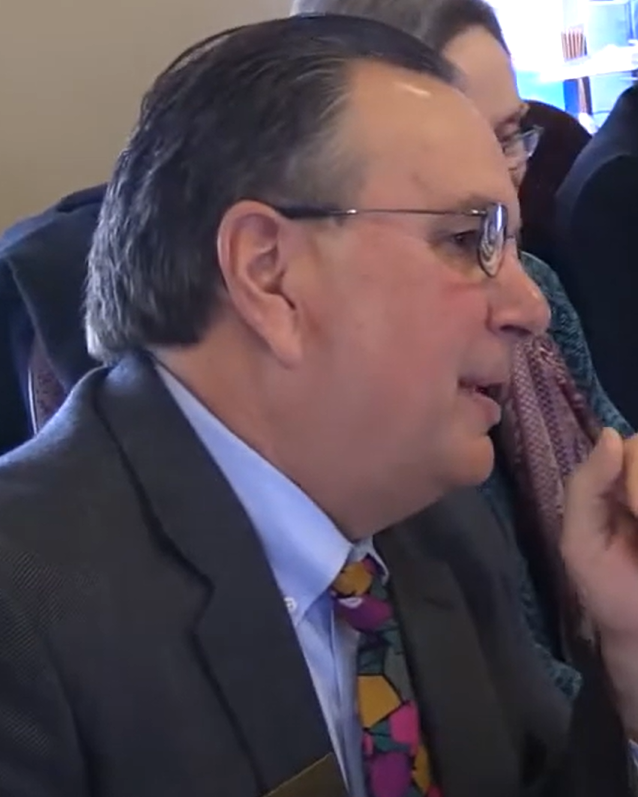
- LaClair in 2018

Member of the Vermont House of Representatives from the Washington 2 district
- In office 2015–2023
- Succeeded by: Gina Galfetti

Personal details
- Born: July 21, 1959 (age 67) Montpelier, Vermont, U.S.
- Party: Republican

Robert A. LaClair (born July 21, 1959) is an American politician from Barre Town, Vermont. A Republican. He served in the Vermont House of Representatives from 2015 to 2023.
