= Dick Sears (politician) =

American politician (1943–2024)

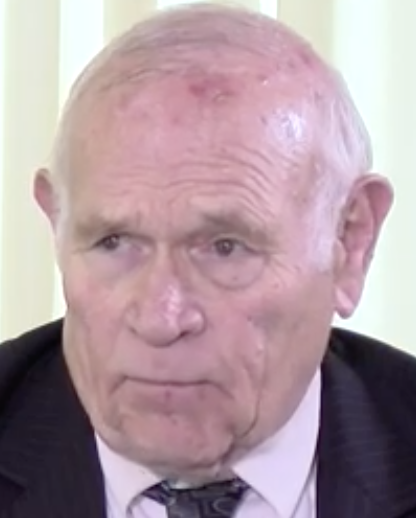
- Sears in 2017

Member of the Vermont Senate from the Bennington district
- In office January 1993 – June 1, 2024 Serving with Brian Campion
- Preceded by: John Page

Personal details
- Born: Richard Warden Sears Jr. April 22, 1943 Framingham, Massachusetts, U.S.
- Died: June 1, 2024 (aged 81) Albany, New York, U.S.
- Party: Democratic
- Spouse: Beverly Bushey
- Education: University of Vermont (BA)

Richard Warden Sears Jr. (April 22, 1943 – June 1, 2024) was an American politician who was a Democratic member of the Vermont State Senate, representing the Bennington senate district.

Sears was first elected to the Vermont State Senate in 1992 and continued to serve until his death in June 2024.

== Biography ==
Sears was born in Framingham, Massachusetts, on April 22, 1943. He attended school in Ashland, Massachusetts, followed by the New Hampton School in New Hampton, New Hampshire. He went on to receive a B.A. degree from the University of Vermont in 1969.

Sears resided in Bennington, Vermont, from 1971, and was married to Beverly Sears (formerly Beverly Bushey).

Sears worked in residential programs for troubled youth from the 1970s. He died in Albany, New York on June 1, 2024, at the age of 81.

== Public life ==
Sears served on the Bennington school board from 1987 to 1993 and was chairman for four of those years.

In 1992, he was elected to the Vermont State Senate, and was reelected in 1994, 1996, 1998, 2000, 2002, 2004, 2006, 2008, 2010, 2012, 2014, 2016, 2018, and 2020.

== See also ==
- Members of the Vermont Senate, 2005-2006 session
- Members of the Vermont Senate, 2007-2008 session
