= Steven Heffernan =

American politician

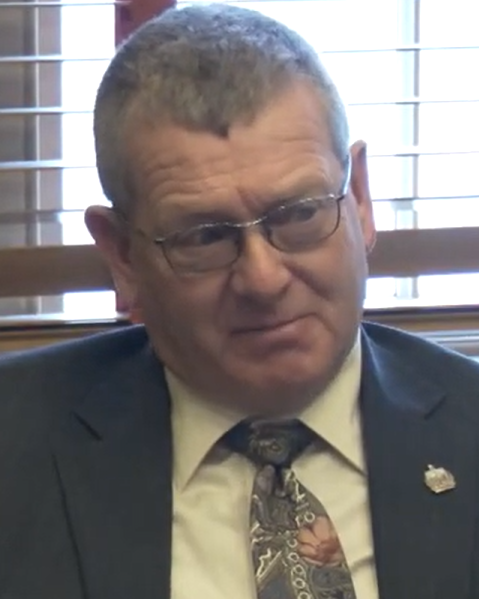
Heffernan in 2025

Steven Heffernan is an American politician. He is represents the Addison district in the Vermont Senate.

== Legislative Actions ==
Senator Heffernan served on the Senate Education Committee and the Senate Agriculture Committee.

He was notably absent for a high profile vote on an Equal Rights constitutional amendment on the Senate Floor in 2026.
