= Addison (Vermont Senate district) =

Electoral district in Vermont, United States

Coordinates: 44.70°N 73.32°W

The Addison district is one of 16 districts of the Vermont Senate. The current district plan is included in the redistricting and reapportionment plan developed by the Vermont General Assembly following the 2020 U.S. census, which applies to legislatures elected in 2022, 2024, 2026, 2028, and 2030.

The Addison district includes all of Addison County, Buel's Gore and the Town of Huntington from Chittenden County, and the Town of Rochester from Windsor County.

== District senators ==
As of 2023

- Ruth Hardy, Democrat
- Christopher Bray, Democrat(As of 2017)
- Claire D. Ayer, Democrat
- Christopher A. Bray, Democrat

== Candidates for 2018 ==
The following information was obtained from the Vermont General Assembly website.

Democratic	Republican
Christopher Bray
Ruth Hardy	

== Towns, city, and gore in the Addison district ==
=== Addison County ===
- Addison
- Bridport
- Bristol
- Cornwall
- Ferrisburgh
- Goshen
- Granville
- Hancock
- Leicester
- Lincoln
- Middlebury
- Monkton
- New Haven
- Orwell
- Panton
- Ripton
- Salisbury
- Shoreham
- Starksboro
- Vergennes
- Waltham
- Weybridge
- Whiting

=== Chittenden County ===
- Buel's Gore
- Huntington

=== Windsor County ===
- Rochester

== Towns and cities in the Addison district, 2012–2022 elections ==
As of the 2010 census, the state as a whole had a population of 625,741. As there are a total of 30 Senators, there were 20,858 residents per senator.

=== Addison County ===
- Addison
- Bridport
- Bristol
- Cornwall
- Ferrisburgh
- Goshen
- Granville
- Hancock
- Leicester
- Lincoln
- Middlebury
- Monkton
- New Haven
- Orwell
- Panton
- Ripton
- Salisbury
- Shoreham
- Starksboro
- Vergennes
- Waltham
- Weybridge
- Whiting

=== Chittenden County ===
- Buel's Gore
- Huntington

== Towns and cities in the Addison district, 2002–2012 elections ==
As of the 2000 census, the state as a whole had a population of 608,827. As there are a total of 30 Senators, there were 20,294 residents per senator. The Addison district had a population of 39,891 in that same census. The district is apportioned two senators. This equals 19,946 residents per senator, 1.72% below the state average.

=== Addison County ===
- Addison
- Bridport
- Bristol
- Cornwall
- Ferrisburgh
- Goshen
- Granville
- Hancock
- Leicester
- Lincoln
- Middlebury
- Monkton
- New Haven
- Orwell
- Panton
- Ripton
- Salisbury
- Shoreham
- Starksboro
- Vergennes
- Waltham
- Weybridge
- Whiting

=== Rutland County ===
- Brandon

== See also ==
- Vermont Senate
