= Larry Hart (politician) =

American politician

Member of the Vermont Senate from the Orange County district
- In office January 8, 2025 – November 14, 2025
- Preceded by: Mark MacDonald
- Succeeded by: John Benson

Personal details
- Born: Topsham, Vermont
- Party: Republican
- Spouse: Emily Waterman-Hart
- Profession: businessman

Larry Hart is an American politician and a member of the Republican Party from Topsham, Vermont. He represented the Orange County district in the Vermont Senate from January to November 2025, winning an election against longtime Democratic incumbent Mark MacDonald.

Hart grew up in Topsham, Vermont, one of three sons born to Larry Hart Sr. and Gertrude Murphy. He served in the United States Marines and was on the Topsham Selectboard for nine years. Later he owned NAPA stores in both Randolph and Bradford.

In October 2025, Hart announced his intention to resign from the Vermont Senate effective November 14 stating "The time and commitment became too great for my health and emotional well-being". In an interview with Seven Days he stated he felt "targeted early on by Democrats" who wanted to reclaim a seat which had been held by a Democrat for decades and said he grew frustrated with Statehouse politics.
