= Bennington (Vermont Senate district) =

Coordinates: 43.05°N 73.10°W

The Bennington district is one of 16 districts of the Vermont Senate. The current district plan is included in the redistricting and reapportionment plan developed by the Vermont General Assembly following the 2020 U.S. census, which applies to legislatures elected in 2022, 2024, 2026, 2028, and 2030.

The Bennington district includes all of Bennington County and the unorganized town of Somerset and the town of Wilmington from Windham County.

== District senators ==
As of 2018, from Vermont General Assembly website.

- Brian Campion, Democrat
- Dick Sears Jr., Democrat

== Candidates for 2018 ==
The following information was obtained from the Vermont Secretary of State website.

Democratic	Republican
Brian Campion (3,570 votes)	Brian Campion (write-in, 87 votes)
Dick Sears (3,828 votes)	Dick Sears (write-in, 110 votes)

== Towns and cities in the Addison district ==
=== Bennington County ===
- Arlington
- Bennington
- Dorset
- Glastenbury
- Landgrove
- Manchester
- Peru
- Pownal
- Readsboro
- Rupert
- Sandgate
- Searsburg
- Shaftsbury
- Stamford
- Sunderland
- Winhall
- Woodford

=== Windham County ===
- Somerset
- Wilmington

== Towns and cities in the Bennington district, 2002–2012 elections ==
=== Bennington County ===
- Arlington
- Bennington
- Dorset
- Glastenbury
- Landgrove
- Manchester
- Peru
- Pownal
- Readsboro
- Rupert
- Sandgate
- Searsburg
- Shaftsbury
- Stamford
- Sunderland
- Winhall
- Woodford

=== Windham County ===
- Wilmington

== See also ==
- Vermont Senate
