= 2020 Vermont Senate election =

- November 3, 2020

All 30 seats in the Vermont Senate 16 seats needed for a majority
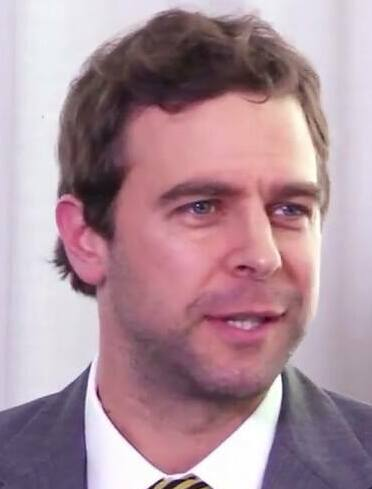

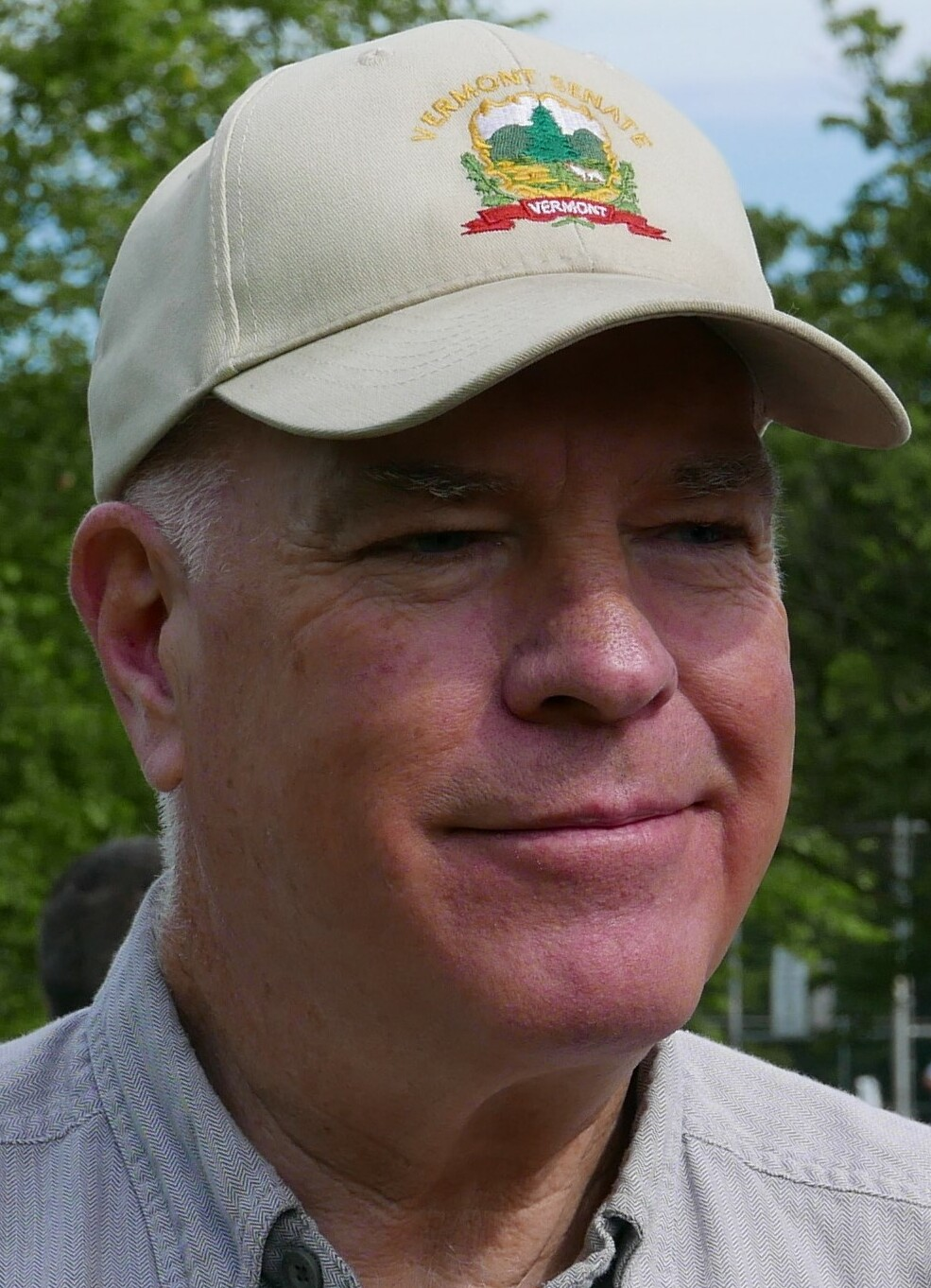

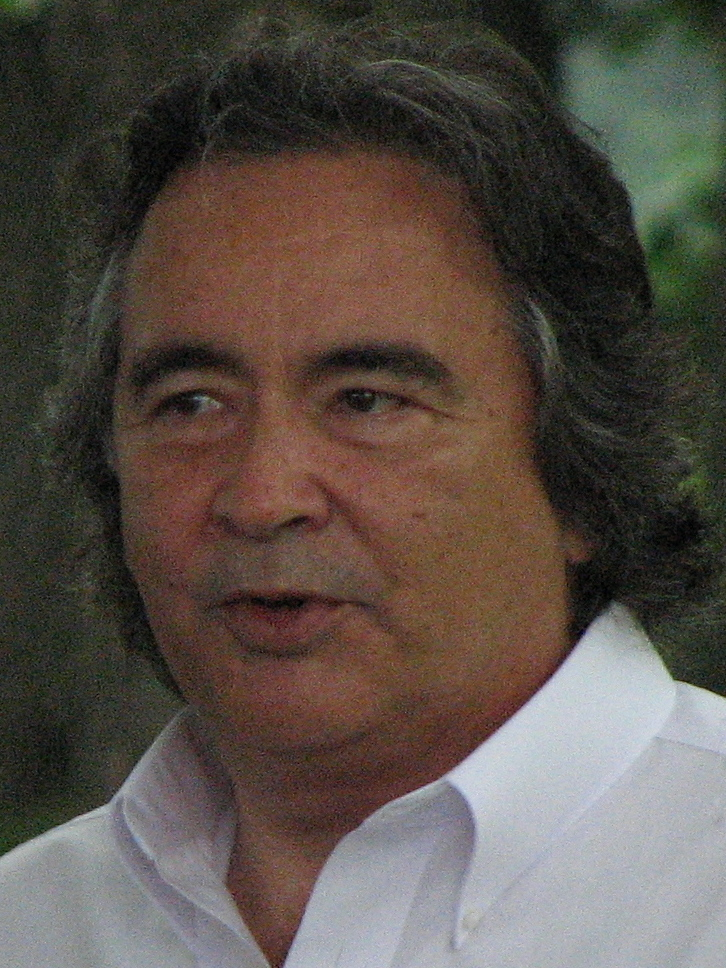
	Majority party	Minority party	Third party
Leader	Tim Ashe (retired)	Joe Benning	Anthony Pollina
Party	Democratic	Republican	Progressive
Leader since	January 6, 2017	January 4, 2018	2013
Leader's seat	Chittenden	Caledonia	Washington
Last election	22	6	2
Seats won	21	7	2
Seat change	▼1	▲1	Steady
Popular vote	481,506 (Note: Not counting Progressive and Republican candidates who were also nominated by the Democratic Party.)	311,329 (Note: Not counting Democratic candidates who were also nominated by the Republican Party.)	56,397 (Note: Not counting Democratic candidates who were also nominated by the Progressive Party.)
Percentage	53.7%	34.7%	6.3%
Swing	▼7.1%	▲8.7%	▼0.3%
- Results: Republican gain Democratic hold Republican hold Progressive hold
President pro tempore before election
Tim Ashe
Democratic
Elected President pro tempore
Becca Balint
Democratic

The 2020 Vermont Senate elections took place as part of the biennial United States elections. Vermont voters elected all 30 state senators from 13 districts, with each district electing between one and six senators. State senators serve two-year terms in the Vermont Senate. A primary election on August 11, 2020, determined which candidates appeared on the November 3 general election ballot. All the members elected would serve in the Vermont General Assembly.

== Results ==
District	Incumbent	Party	Elected senator	Party
Addison	Ruth Hardy	Dem	Ruth Hardy	Dem
Addison	Christopher Bray	Dem	Christopher Bray	Dem
Bennington	Brian Campion	Dem	Brian Campion	Dem
Bennington	Dick Sears	Dem	Dick Sears	Dem
Caledonia	Joe Benning	Rep	Joe Benning	Rep
Caledonia	Jane Kitchel	Dem	Jane Kitchel	Dem
Chittenden	Tim Ashe	Dem/Prog	Thomas Chittenden	Dem
Chittenden	Phil Baruth	Dem/Prog	Phil Baruth	Dem/Prog
Chittenden	Debbie Ingram	Dem	Kesha Ram Hinsdale	Dem
Chittenden	Ginny Lyons	Dem	Ginny Lyons	Dem
Chittenden	Christopher Pearson	Prog/Dem	Christopher Pearson	Prog/Dem
Chittenden	Michael Sirotkin	Dem	Michael Sirotkin	Dem
Essex-Orleans	John Rodgers	Dem	Russ Ingalls	Rep
Essex-Orleans	Robert Starr	Dem	Robert Starr	Dem
Franklin	Corey Parent	Rep	Corey Parent	Rep/Dem
Franklin	Randy Brock	Rep	Randy Brock	Rep/Dem
Grand Isle	Richard Mazza	Dem	Richard Mazza	Dem/Rep
Lamoille	Richard Westman	Rep	Richard Westman	Rep/Dem
Orange	Mark MacDonald	Dem	Mark MacDonald	Dem
Rutland	Brian Collamore	Rep	Brian Collamore	Rep
Rutland	James McNeil	Rep	Joshua Terenzini	Rep
Rutland	Cheryl Hooker	Dem/Prog	Cheryl Hooker	Dem
Washington	Andrew Perchlik	Dem/Prog	Andrew Perchlik	Dem/Prog
Washington	Ann Cummings	Dem	Ann Cummings	Dem
Washington	Anthony Pollina	Prog/Dem	Anthony Pollina	Prog/Dem
Windham	Becca Balint	Dem	Becca Balint	Dem
Windham	Jeanette White	Dem	Jeanette White	Dem
Windsor	Alison Clarkson	Dem	Alison Clarkson	Dem
Windsor	Richard McCormack	Dem	Richard McCormack	Dem
Windsor	Alice Nitka	Dem	Alice Nitka	Dem/Rep

== Retiring incumbents ==
Three incumbent senators (two Democrats and one Republican) did not seek reelection.

1. Chittenden: Tim Ashe (D/P) (ran for ;ieutenant governor [lost primary])
2. Chittenden: Debbie Ingram (D)
3. Rutland: James McNeil (R)

== Defeated incumbents ==
=== In the primary ===
No incumbent senator was defeated in the August 11 primary.

=== In the general election ===
One incumbent senator sought reelection but was defeated in the general election.

1. Essex-Orleans: John S. Rodgers (D) (sought reelection as an independent)

== Predictions ==
Source	Ranking	As of
The Cook Political Report	Safe D	October 21, 2020

== Detailed results ==
Source for all election results:

=== Addison ===
- Elects two senators.

Addison general election, 2020
Party	Candidate	Votes	%
Democratic	Ruth Hardy (incumbent)	13,063	32.8
Democratic	Christopher A. Bray (incumbent)	12,522	31.4
Republican	Peter Briggs	8,007	20.1
Republican	John Christiano	5,442	13.6
Libertarian	Archie Flower	773	1.9
Write-in	Write-ins	62	0.2
Total votes		39,869	100.0
Democratic hold			
Democratic hold			

=== Bennington ===
- Elects two senators.

Bennington general election, 2020
Party	Candidate	Votes	%
Democratic	Richard W. Sears (incumbent)	11,063	31.2
Democratic	Brian Campion (incumbent)	10,483	29.5
Republican	Meg Hansen	6,275	17.7
Republican	Mike Hall	5,657	15.9
Independent	Kevin Hoyt	1,943	5.5
Write-in	Write-ins	57	0.2
Total votes		35,478	100.0
Democratic hold			
Democratic hold			

=== Caledonia ===
- Elects two senators.

Caledonia general election, 2020
Party	Candidate	Votes	%
Democratic	Jane Kitchel (incumbent)	10,285	29.9
Republican	Joe Benning (incumbent)	10,057	29.2
Democratic	Matthew Choate	7,342	21.3
Republican	Charles Wilson	5,442	15.8
Libertarian	J.T. Dodge	1,255	3.6
Write-in	Write-ins	62	0.2
Total votes		34,443	100.0
Democratic hold			
Republican hold			

=== Chittenden ===
- Elects six senators.

Democratic primary

Chittenden Democratic primary
Party	Candidate	Votes	%
Democratic	Virginia V. Lyons (incumbent)	21,198	13.9
Democratic	Kesha Ram	20,181	13.2
Democratic	Michael Sirotkin (incumbent)	15,208	10.0
Democratic	Philip Baruth (incumbent)	14,677	9.6
Democratic	Thomas Chittenden	13,556	8.9
Democratic	Christopher Pearson (incumbent)	11,764	7.7
Democratic	June Heston	11,719	7.7
Democratic	David Scherr	9,562	6.3
Democratic	Dylan Giambatista	9,331	6.1
Democratic	Erhard Mahnke	7,878	5.2
Democratic	Adam Roof	7,785	5.1
Democratic	Louis Meyers	4,838	3.2
Democratic	Steve May	4,371	2.9
Democratic	Write-ins	271	0.2
Total votes		152,339	100.0

General election

Chittenden general election, 2020
Party	Candidate	Votes	%
Democratic	Thomas Chittenden	50,974	12.9
Democratic	Virginia V. Lyons (incumbent)	48,602	12.3
Democratic	Kesha Ram	46,513	11.8
Democratic	Michael Sirotkin (incumbent)	45,819	11.6
Democratic	Philip Baruth (incumbent) (Note: Candidate received the nominations of both the Democratic and Progressive parties and was listed on the ballot as "Democratic/Progressive" (candidate is primarily a Democrat).)	43,923	11.1
Progressive	Christopher Pearson (incumbent) (Note: Candidate received the nominations of both the Progressive and Democratic parties and was listed on the ballot as "Progressive/Democratic" (candidate is primarily a Progressive).)	33,445	8.5
Republican	Susan Bowen	21,900	5.5
Republican	Tom Chastenay	19,300	4.9
Republican	Ericka Redic	18,945	4.8
Republican	Kase Long	18,763	4.7
Republican	Dean Rolland	17,604	4.5
Republican	Kylie Hollingsworth	16,319	4.1
Independent	James Ehlers	11,919	3.0
Write-in	Write-ins	631	0.2
Total votes		394,657	100.0
Democratic hold			
Democratic hold			
Democratic hold			
Democratic hold			
Democratic hold			
Progressive hold			

=== Essex-Orleans ===
- Elects two senators.

Essex-Orleans general election, 2020
Party	Candidate	Votes	%
Democratic	Robert A. Starr (incumbent)	8,668	27.1
Republican	Russ Ingalls	7,739	24.2
Republican	Jonathan Morin	5,354	16.7
Democratic	Ron Horton	5,100	16.0
Independent	John S. Rodgers (incumbent) (Note: Elected as a Democrat in 2018.)	5,033	15.7
Write-in	Write-ins	64	0.2
Total votes		31,958	100.0
Democratic hold			
Republican gain from Democratic			

=== Franklin ===
- Elects two senators.

Franklin general election, 2020
Party	Candidate	Votes	%
Republican	Corey Parent (incumbent) (Note: Candidate received the nominations of both the Republican and Democratic parties and was listed on the ballot as "Republican/Democratic" (candidate is primarily a Republican).)	16,002	40.4
Republican	Randy Brock (incumbent)	15,508	39.1
Progressive	Chloe Collins	3,777	9.5
Independent	Wayne Billado III	2,245	5.7
Progressive	Luke Richter	1,975	5.0
Write-in	Write-ins	141	0.4
Total votes		39,648	100.0
Republican hold			
Republican hold			

=== Grand Isle ===
- Elects one senator.

Grand Isle general election, 2020
Party	Candidate	Votes	%
Democratic	Richard Mazza (incumbent) (Note: Candidate received the nominations of both the Democratic and Republican parties and was listed on the ballot as "Democratic/Republican" (candidate is primarily a Democrat).)	11,241	97.8
Write-in	Write-ins	256	2.2
Total votes		11,497	100.0
Democratic hold			

=== Lamoille ===
- Elects one senator.

Lamoille general election, 2020
Party	Candidate	Votes	%
Republican	Richard A. Westman (incumbent)	11,477	97.7
Write-in	Write-ins	265	2.3
Total votes		11,742	100.0
Republican hold			

=== Orange ===
- Elects one senator.

Democratic primary

Orange Democratic primary
Party	Candidate	Votes	%
Democratic	Mark MacDonald (incumbent)	2,168	63.4
Democratic	Susan Hatch Davis	1,223	35.8
Democratic	Write-ins	28	0.8
Total votes		3,419	100.0

General election

Orange general election, 2020
Party	Candidate	Votes	%
Democratic	Mark MacDonald (incumbent)	6,420	54.5
Republican	Bill Huff	5,321	45.2
Write-in	Write-ins	31	0.3
Total votes		11,772	100.0
Democratic hold			

=== Rutland ===
- Elects three senators.

Democratic primary

Rutland Democratic primary
Party	Candidate	Votes	%
Democratic	Cheryl Hooker (incumbent)	5,507	37.3
Democratic	Greg Cox	4,207	28.5
Democratic	Larry Courcelle	3,305	22.4
Democratic	Christopher Hoyt	1,592	10.8
Democratic	Write-ins	155	1.0
Total votes		14,766	100.0

General election

Rutland general election, 2020
Party	Candidate	Votes	%
Republican	Brian Collamore (incumbent)	14,861	18.3
Republican	Joshua Terenzini	14,008	17.3
Democratic	Cheryl Hooker (incumbent)	13,196	16.2
Republican	Terry Williams	11,828	14.6
Democratic	Greg Cox	10,280	12.7
Democratic	Larry Courcelle	8,334	10.3
Independent	Brittany Cavacas	4,731	5.8
Independent	Michael Shank	2,266	2.8
Independent	Casey Jennings	1,009	1.2
Independent	Richard "Sensei" Lenchus	552	0.7
Write-in	Write-ins	99	0.1
Total votes		81,164	100.0
Republican hold			
Republican hold			
Democratic hold			

=== Washington ===
- Elects three senators.

Democratic primary

Washington Democratic primary
Party	Candidate	Votes	%
Democratic	Ann Cummings (incumbent)	8,590	31.0
Democratic	Andrew Perchlik (incumbent)	7,643	27.6
Democratic	Anthony Pollina (incumbent)	6,558	23.6
Democratic	Theo Kennedy	4,812	17.3
Democratic	Write-ins	134	0.5
Total votes		27,737	100.0

Republican primary

Washington Republican primary
Party	Candidate	Votes	%
Republican	Dawnmarie Tomasi	2,545	27.5
Republican	Dwayne Tucker	2,545	27.5
Republican	Ken Alger	2,388	25.8
Republican	Brent Young	1,592	17.2
Republican	Write-ins	181	1.9
Total votes		9,251	100.0

General election

Washington general election, 2020
Party	Candidate	Votes	%
Democratic	Ann Cummings (incumbent)	21,159	25.2
Progressive	Anthony Pollina (incumbent)	17,200	20.5
Democratic	Andrew Perchlik (incumbent)	15,029	17.9
Republican	Dwayne Tucker	9,258	11.0
Republican	Dawnmarie Tomasi	9,191	11.0
Republican	Ken Alger	9,113	10.9
Independent	Paul Vallerand	2,678	3.2
Write-in	Write-ins	186	0.2
Total votes		83,814	100.0
Democratic hold			
Progressive hold			
Democratic hold			

=== Windham ===
- Elects two senators.

Windham general election, 2020
Party	Candidate	Votes	%
Democratic	Becca Balint (incumbent)	14,520	37.8
Democratic	Jeanette White (incumbent)	13,683	35.6
Republican	Marcus Parish	4,359	11.3
Republican	John Lyddy	4,265	11.1
Independent	Tyler Colford	1,499	3.9
Write-in	Write-ins	87	0.2
Total votes		38,413	100.0
Democratic hold			
Democratic hold			

=== Windsor ===
- Elects three senators.

Windsor general election, 2020
Party	Candidate	Votes	%
Democratic	Alison H. Clarkson (incumbent)	19,084	23.3
Democratic	Richard McCormack (incumbent)	17,477	21.4
Democratic	Alice Nitka (incumbent)	16,726	20.4
Republican	Jack Williams	9,702	11.9
Republican	Michael Jasinski Sr.	9,632	11.8
Independent	Keith Stern	4,605	5.6
Independent	Doug Wilberding	2,855	3.5
Independent	Mason Wade	1,471	1.8
Write-in	Write-ins	251	0.3
Total votes		81,803	100.0
Democratic hold			
Democratic hold			
Democratic hold			

== See also ==
- 2020 Vermont elections
- 2020 United States elections
- 2020 United States House of Representatives election in Vermont
- 2020 Vermont gubernatorial election
- 2020 Vermont elections
- 2020 Vermont House of Representatives election
