= Selene Colburn =

American politician from Vermont

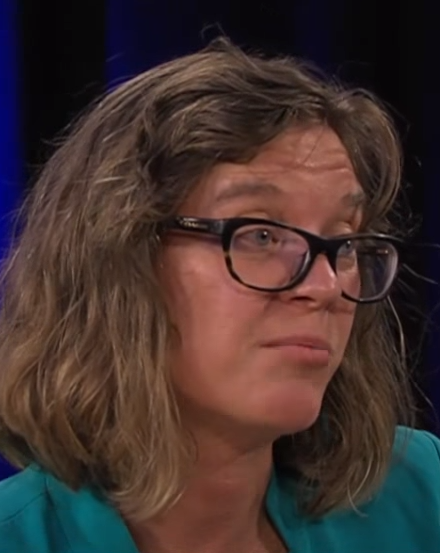

Chair of the Progressive Caucus in the Vermont House of Representatives
- In office 2021–2023
- Preceded by: Robin Chesnut-Tangerman

Member of the Vermont House of Representatives from the Chittenden-6-4 district
- In office 2017–2023 Serving with Brian Cina
- Preceded by: Christopher Pearson; Kesha Ram Hinsdale
- Succeeded by: Troy Headrick

Member of the Burlington City Council
- In office 2014–2017
- Preceded by: Kevin Worden
- Succeeded by: Richard Deane
- Constituency: 3rd district (2014–2015); East district (2015–2017)

Personal details
- Born: c. 1970 Burlington, Vermont, U.S.
- Party: Progressive
- Other political affiliations: Democratic
- Children: 2
- Education: Bennington College (BA); Simmons University (MA)

Selene Colburn is an American politician who serving in the Vermont House of Representatives from the Chittenden-6-4 district from 2017 to 2023 as a member of the Vermont Progressive Party. Prior to her tenure in the State House, she served on the city council in Burlington, Vermont. She is the first female chair of the House Progressive Caucus.

Colburn was born in Burlington, and educated at Burlington High School, Bennington College, and Simmons University. She became active in politics in her youth when she joined anti-war demonstrations.

Colburn was first elected to office with her election to the Burlington city council in the 2014 election and she won reelection in the 2015 and 2017 elections. She was elected to the state house alongside Brian Cina in the 2016 election with the nominations of the Progressive and Democratic parties and was reelected in the 2018 and 2020 elections. She was selected to serve as assistant chair of the Vermont Progressive Party's caucus in the state house and then to serve as chair.

== Early life ==
Selene Colburn was born in Burlington, Vermont. She participated in anti-war demonstrations as a teenager in the 1980s. She graduated from Burlington High School in 1987. Colburn graduated from Bennington College with a Bachelor of Arts in dance in 1991, and graduated with a master's degree in library and information science from Simmons University.

== Career ==
=== Local politics ===
Colburn was elected to the Burlington city council to succeed Kevin Worden with the nomination of the Vermont Progressive Party in the 2011 election without opposition after Democratic nominee Molly Loomis dropped out. During the campaign, she had raised $3,055 and spent $2,049. She was redistricted into the East district and defeated Democratic nominee Carmen Scoles in the 2015 election. She did not run for reelection in the 2017 election and was succeeded by Democratic nominee Richard Deane.

She served as Rachel Siegel's campaign manager when Siegel ran for a seat on Burlington's city council. Carina Driscoll won the endorsement of the Vermont Progressive Party during the 2018 Burlington mayoral election after Colburn nominated Driscoll for the party's endorsement. During the 2019 election, she served as Jack Hanson's campaign treasurer for his city council campaign. She served as city councilor Jack Hanson's campaign treasurer during the 2021 election. Colburn endorsed Max Tracy, the Progressive nominee, during the 2021 Burlington mayoral election.

=== Vermont House of Representatives ===
Representatives Chris Pearson, a member of the Progressive Party, and Kesha Ram, a member of the Democratic Party, declined to run for reelection to the Vermont House of Representatives in 2016. Colburn ran for a seat in the state house from the Chittenden-6-4 district in the 2018 election with the nominations of the Democratic and Progressive parties and won in the general election alongside Brian Cina. During the campaign she was endorsed by Senator Bernie Sanders. She and Cina were reelection in the 2018 and 2020 elections.

During the 2020 session of the state house Colburn served as assistant chair of the Vermont Progressive Party's caucus in the state house. In 2020, she was selected by a unanimous vote of seven to serve as chair of the Vermont Progressive Party's caucus in the state house while Emma Mulvaney-Stanak was selected to serve as assistant chair. She is the first woman to lead the Vermont Progressive Party's caucus in the state house.

== Political positions ==
Colburn introduced legislation in the state house to make all single occupancy restrooms gender neutral which was passed by the state legislature and signed into law by Governor Phil Scott. She introduced legislation in the state house to decriminalize prostitution.

The city council voted six to five, with Colburn in favor, in favor of a non-binding resolution encouraging employees of the Howard Center to be paid a living wage. The state house voted 89 to 58, with Colburn in favor, in favor of raising the minimum wage and creating a paid family leave program. She and Representatives Diana Gonzalez and Cina wrote an open letter calling for at least twenty percent of Vermont's police budget to be diverted to other services.

== Electoral history ==
Selene Colburn electoral history

2014 Burlington, Vermont city council 1st district election
Party	Candidate	Votes	%
Progressive	Selene Colburn	554	94.22%
Write-in		34	5.78%
Total votes		588	100.00%

2015 Burlington, Vermont city council East district election
Party	Candidate	Votes	%
Progressive	Selene Colburn (incumbent)	580	60.10%
Democratic	Carmen Scoles	383	39.69%
Write-in		2	0.21%
Total votes		588	100.00%

2016 Vermont House of Representatives Chittenden-6-4 district Democratic primary
Party	Candidate	Votes	%
Democratic	Selene Colburn	575	47.09%
Democratic	Brian Cina	378	30.96%
Democratic	Judy P. Rosenstreich	264	21.62%
Write-in		4	0.33%
Total votes		1,221	100.00%

2016 Vermont House of Representatives Chittenden-6-4 district election
Party	Candidate	Votes	%
Progressive	Selene Colburn		
Democratic	Selene Colburn		
Total	Selene Colburn	1,691	52.37%
Progressive	Brian Cina		
Democratic	Brian Cina		
Total	Brian Cina	1,506	46.64%
Write-in		32	0.99%
Total votes		3,229	100.00%
	Blank	1,633	

2018 Vermont House of Representatives Chittenden-6-4 district Democratic primary
Party	Candidate	Votes	%	±%
Democratic	Selene Colburn (incumbent)	575	56.15%	+9.06%
Democratic	Brian Cina (incumbent)	378	36.91%	+5.95%
Write-in		9	0.88%	+0.55%
Total votes		1,024	100.00%	
	Blank	304		

2018 Vermont House of Representatives Chittenden-6-4 district election
Party	Candidate	Votes	%	±%
Progressive	Selene Colburn (incumbent)			
Democratic	Selene Colburn (incumbent)			
Total	Selene Colburn (incumbent)	2,199	52.92%	+0.55%
Progressive	Brian Cina (incumbent)			
Democratic	Brian Cina (incumbent)			
Total	Brian Cina (incumbent)	1,936	46.59%	-0.05%
Write-in		20	0.48%	-0.51%
Total votes		4,155	100.00%	
	Blank	1,335		

2020 Vermont House of Representatives Chittenden-6-4 district Democratic primary
Party	Candidate	Votes	%	±%
Democratic	Selene Colburn (incumbent)	904	53.15%	−3.00%
Democratic	Brian Cina (incumbent)	778	45.74%	+8.83%
Write-in		19	1.12%	+0.24%
Total votes		1,701	100.00%	
	Blank	520		
	Spoiled	1		

2020 Vermont House of Representatives Chittenden-6-4 district election
Party	Candidate	Votes	%	±%
Progressive	Selene Colburn (incumbent)			
Democratic	Selene Colburn (incumbent)			
Total	Selene Colburn (incumbent)	2,147	52.92%	±0.00%
Progressive	Brian Cina (incumbent)			
Democratic	Brian Cina (incumbent)			
Total	Brian Cina (incumbent)	1,858	45.80%	-0.79%
Write-in		52	1.28%	+0.80%
Total votes		4,057	100.00%	
	Blank	1,677		
