= Chittenden-Southeast (Vermont Senate district) =

The Chittenden-Southeast Vermont Senate District is an election district of the Vermont Senate. It was fielded after the 2022 US Census, when legislators decided to create multiple districts from the Chittenden district, which had elected six senators at-large.

Chittenden-Southeast includes a small portion of Burlington, the city of South Burlington, and the towns of Shelburne, Charlotte, Hinesburg, Bolton, Richmond, St. George, Williston, Jericho, and Underhill.

The Chiitenden-Southeast district elects three senators at-large. In 2022 and 2024, it chose Thomas Chittenden, Virginia V. Lyons, and Kesha Ram Hinsdale.
