= 2026 Vermont lieutenant gubernatorial election =

- November 3, 2026
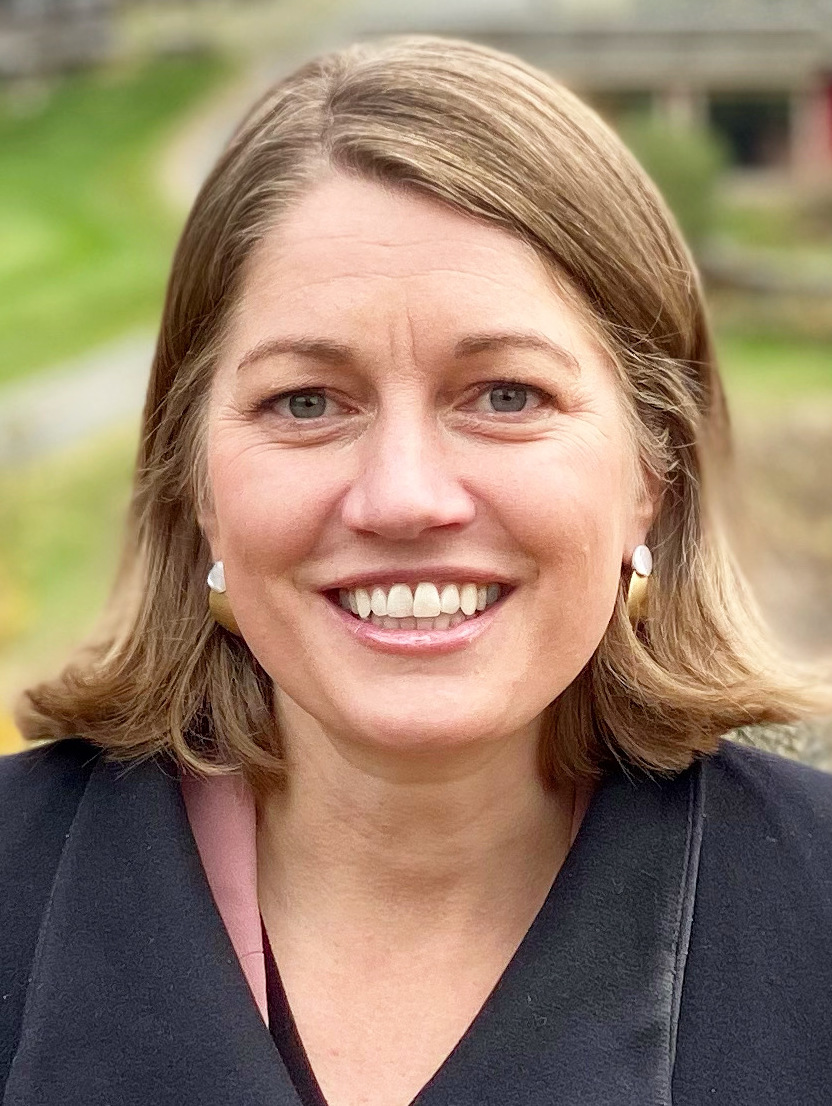

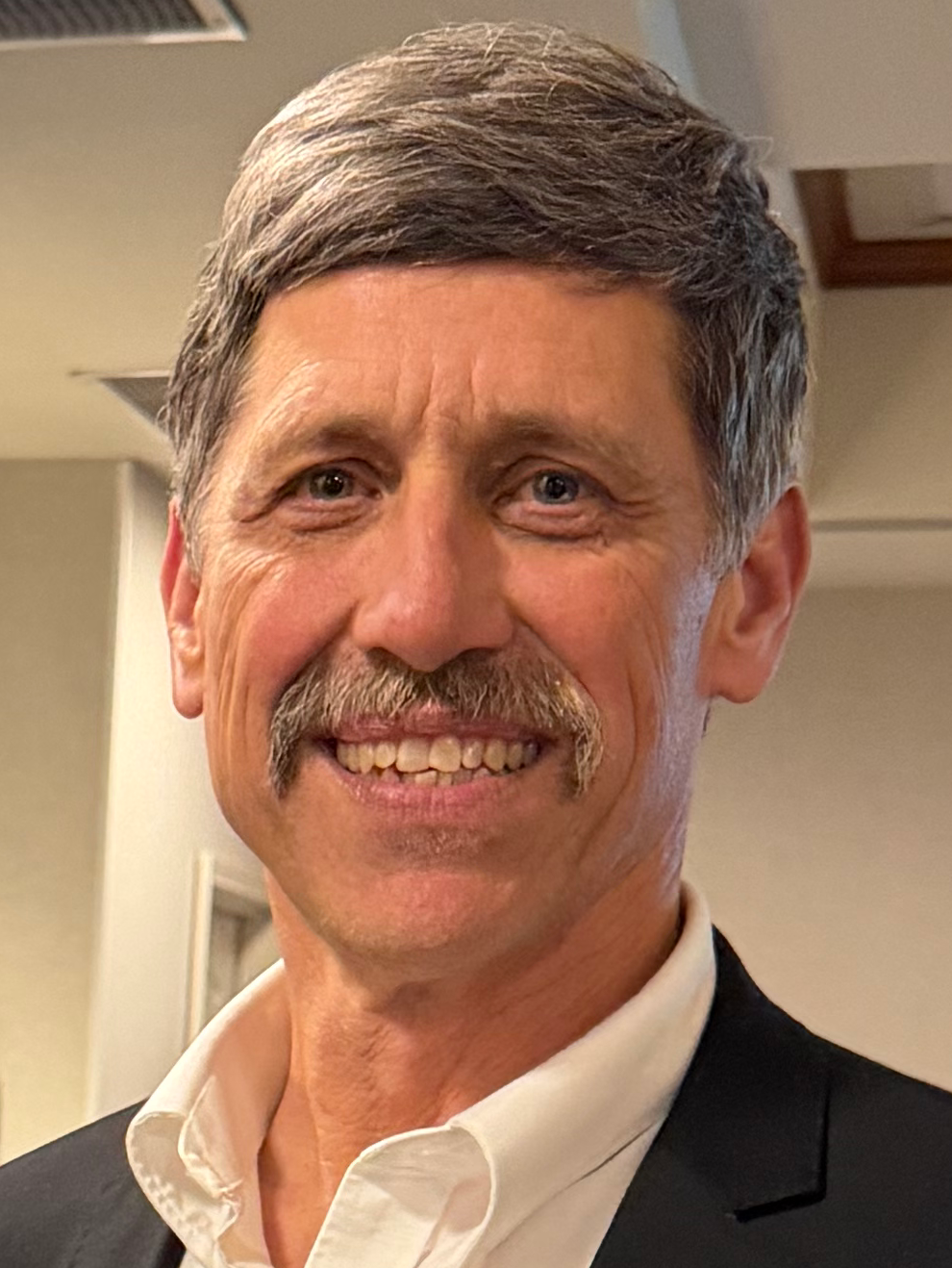
Nominee	Molly Gray	John Rodgers
Party	Democratic	Republican
Popular vote	190,988	112,754
Percentage	62.76%	37.05%
Lieutenant Governor before election
John Rodgers
Republican
Elected Lieutenant Governor
Molly Gray
Democratic

The 2026 Vermont lieutenant gubernatorial election was held on November 3, 2026, to elect the lieutenant governor of Vermont. Republican incumbent John Rodgers sought a second term. He was defeated by Democratic former lieutenant governor Molly Gray.

Primary elections were held on August 11, 2026. Rodgers secured the Republican nomination unopposed. Gray defeated DNC member Ryan McLaren and 2024 gubernatorial nominee Esther Charlestin in the Democratic primary with 60.8% of the vote.

Gray unseated Rodgers with over 62% of the vote to reclaim her old seat, leaving Governor Phil Scott again as the only Republican office holder in Vermont.

This was the second biggest Democratic margin for lieutenant governor of Vermont in the history of Vermont, despite there being an incumbent Republican running for re-election. The biggest Democratic margin for lieutenant governor of Vermont was Howard Dean's 36-point re-election margin in 1988.

== Republican primary ==
=== Candidates ===
==== Nominee ====
- John Rodgers, incumbent lieutenant governor (2025–present)

=== Endorsements ===
John Rodgers

Statewide officials

- Jim Douglas, former governor of Vermont (2003–2011)
- Phil Scott, governor of Vermont (2017–present)

=== Results ===
Republican primary results
Party	Candidate	Votes	%
Republican	John Rodgers (incumbent)	20,173	97.2
Write-in		585	2.8
Total votes		20,758	100.0

== Democratic primary ==
=== Candidates ===
==== Nominee ====
- Molly Gray, former lieutenant governor (2021–2023)

==== Eliminated in primary ====
- Esther Charlestin, chair of the Vermont Commission on Women and 2024 gubernatorial nominee
- Ryan McLaren, member of the Democratic National Committee

=== Endorsements ===
Esther Charlestin

Organizations

- Moms Demand Action
Molly Gray

Executive branch officials

- Madeline Kunin, former ambassador to Switzerland (1996–1999)

Statewide officials

- Howard Dean, former governor of Vermont (1991–2003)

State legislators

- 9 state senators
- 29 state representatives
- 3 former state representatives

Organizations

- Our Revolution
Ryan McLaren

U.S. senators

- Peter Welch, Vermont (2023–present)

U.S. representatives

- Ro Khanna, CA-17 (2017–present)

Statewide officials

- Jim Condos, former secretary of state of Vermont (2011–2023)
- David Zuckerman, former lieutenant governor of Vermont (2017–2021, 2023–2025)

=== Polling ===
Poll source	Date(s) administered	Sample size (Note: Key: A – all adults RV – registered voters LV – likely voters V – unclear)	Margin of error	Esther Charletin	Molly Gray	Ryan McLaren	Other	Undecided
University of New Hampshire	July 15–20, 2026	560 (LV)	± 4.1%	9%	39%	11%	1% (Note: "Write in someone else" with 1%)	41%
University of New Hampshire	June 18–23, 2026	511 (LV)	± 4.3%	11%	39%	7%	1%	42%

=== Results ===
Democratic primary results
Party	Candidate	Votes	%
Democratic	Molly Gray	50,884	60.8
Democratic	Ryan McLaren	23,111	27.6
Democratic	Esther Charlestin	9,135	10.9
Write-in		587	0.7
Total votes		83,717	100.0

== Third party candidates ==
=== Freedom and Unity primary ===
==== Nominee ====
- Charlie Bass, high school student

== General election ==
=== Polling ===
Poll source	Date(s) administered	Sample size	Margin of error	John Rodgers (R)	Molly Gray (D)	Other	Undecided
University of New Hampshire	October 27–31, 2026	1,172 (LV)	± 2.9%	34%	63%	1% (Note: "Another candidate" with 1%)	2%
State Navigate	October 23–25, 2026	1,752 (LV)	± 2.3%	37% (Note: With voters who lean towards a given candidate)	58%	—	5%
State Navigate	October 23–25, 2026	1,752 (LV)	± 2.3%	36%	57%	—	7%
State Navigate	October 2–4, 2026	948 (LV)	± 3.2%	32%	59%	—	9%
State Navigate	October 2–4, 2026	948 (LV)	± 3.2%	30%	56%	—	15%
Braun Research/Vermont Public	September 10–21, 2026	817 (RV)	± 3.4%	35%	43%	3% (Note: "None/Write-in/Other" with 3%)	19%
Braun Research/Vermont Public	September 10–21, 2026	732 (LV)	± 3.4%	37%	46%	3%	15%
University of New Hampshire	September 17–21, 2026	829 (LV)	± 3.3%	35%	54%	—	11%
	August 11, 2026	Primary elections					
University of New Hampshire	July 15–20, 2026	954 (LV)	± 3.2%	29%	49%	2% (Note: "Another candidate" with 2%)	20%
University of New Hampshire	June 18–23, 2026	887 (LV)	± 3.3%	29%	45%	1%	26%

Hypothetical polling

Esther Charlestin vs. John Rodgers

Poll source	Date(s) administered	Sample size	Margin of error	Esther Charlestin (D)	John Rodgers (R)	Other	Undecided
University of New Hampshire	July 15–20, 2026	954 (LV)	± 3.2%	40%	30%	5% (Note: "Another candidate" with 5%)	25%
University of New Hampshire	June 18–23, 2026	887 (LV)	± 3.3%	35%	30%	2% (Note: "Write in someone else" with 2%)	33%

Ryan McLaren vs. John Rodgers

Poll source	Date(s) administered	Sample size	Margin of error	Ryan McLaren (D)	John Rodgers (R)	Other	Undecided
University of New Hampshire	July 15–20, 2026	954 (LV)	± 3.2%	43%	27%	3% (Note: "Another candidate" with 3%)	26%
University of New Hampshire	June 18–23, 2026	887 (LV)	± 3.3%	32%	30%	1%	37%

=== Results ===
2026 Vermont lieutenant gubernatorial election
Party	Candidate	Votes	%	±%
Democratic	Molly Gray	190,988	62.76	
Republican	John Rodgers (incumbent)	112,754	37.05	−11.71
Write-in		556	0.18	
Total votes		304,298	100.0	
Democratic gain from Republican				
