= Sally Fox (politician) =

American lawyer and politician

Member of the Vermont Senate from the Chittenden district
- In office 2011 – January 10, 2014

Member of the Vermont House of Representatives from the Chittenden County district
- In office 1987–2001

Personal details
- Born: Sally Gail Fox; January 30, 1951 Omaha, Nebraska, U.S.
- Died: January 10, 2014 (aged 62) South Burlington, Vermont, U.S.
- Party: Democratic
- Spouse: Michael Sirotkin
- Children: 2
- Education: University of Wisconsin–Madison (BA); University at Buffalo Law School (JD)
- Profession: Attorney

Sally Gail Fox (January 30, 1951 – January 10, 2014) was an American lawyer and politician.

Sally Fox was born on January 30, 1951, in Omaha, Nebraska, to Philip and Delores Fox. Fox received a bachelor's degree in social work from University of Wisconsin–Madison and a Juris Doctor degree from University at Buffalo Law School.

Fox met Michael Sirotkin while taking a class in preparation for the Colorado bar exam. They married on October 7, 1979. Fox and Sirotkin moved to Vermont when Sirotkin received a job offer there.

Prior to entering politics, Fox worked as an attorney for the Vermont Disabilities Law Project of Vermont Legal Aid.

A Democrat, Fox represented Chittenden County in the Vermont House of Representatives from 1987 to 2001. Fox then began serving in the Vermont State Senate from 2011. Outside of politics, Fox was the director of Family Courts for the Judiciary of Vermont. She was also Vermont Businesses for Social Responsibility's director of policy. Fox coordinated the City of Burlington's Offender Reentry Program, and she was Vermont State Colleges' governmental affairs director.

On January 10, 2014, after a two-year battle with a rare form of lung cancer, Fox died in South Burlington, Vermont. Fox's husband, Michael Sirotkin, was appointed to take Fox's place in the Vermont Senate.
