= VCW =

VCW may stand for:

- Vermont Commission on Women
- VCW Cavendish, 9th Duke of Devonshire
