= Molly Gray =

American politician (born 1984)

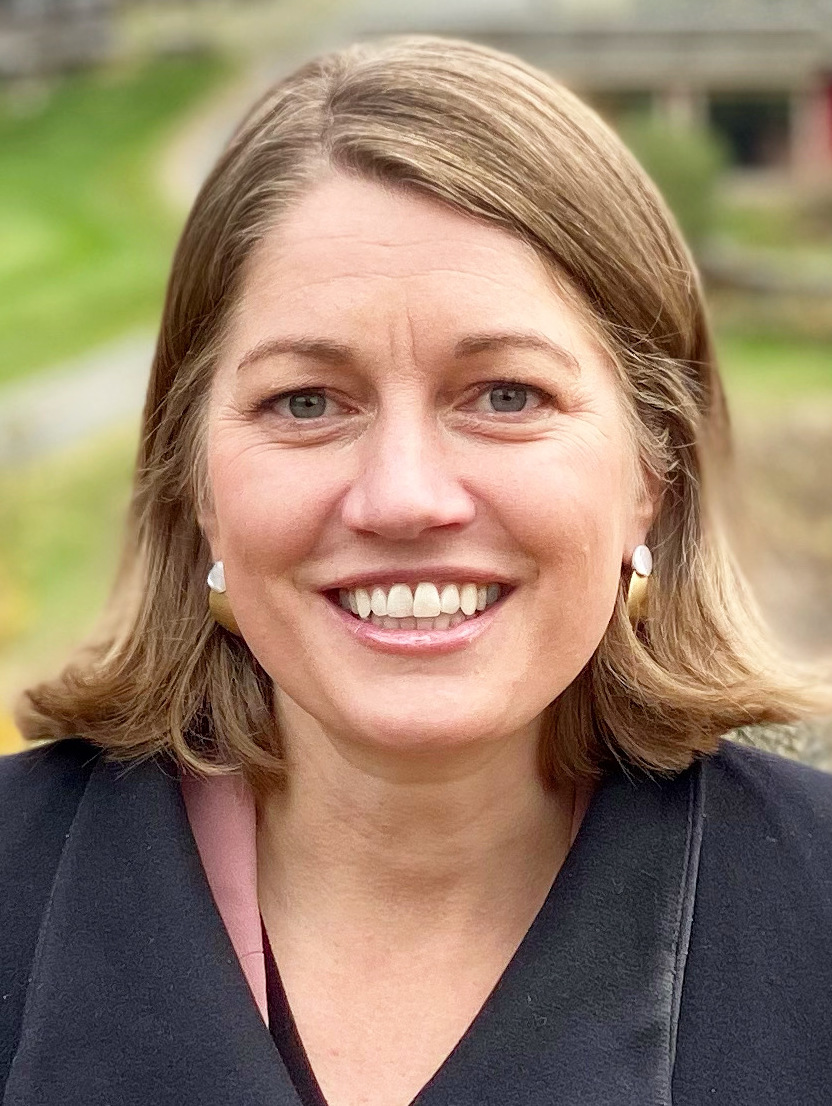
- Gray in 2020

Lieutenant Governor-elect of Vermont
- Assuming office January 1, 2027
- Governor: Phil Scott
- Succeeding: John S. Rodgers

83rd Lieutenant Governor of Vermont
- In office January 7, 2021 – January 5, 2023
- Governor: Phil Scott
- Preceded by: David Zuckerman
- Succeeded by: David Zuckerman

Personal details
- Born: Molly Rose Gray; March 18, 1984 (age 42) Newbury, Vermont, U.S.
- Party: Democratic
- Spouse: Michael Palm (m. 2021)
- Children: 1
- Parent: Bob Gray (father)
- Relatives: William B. Gray (uncle)
- Education: University of Vermont (BA); Vermont Law School (JD); Graduate Institute of International and Development Studies (LLM)
- Website: Campaign website

Molly Rose Gray (born March 18, 1984) is an American attorney and politician who served as the 83rd lieutenant governor of Vermont from 2021 to 2023 and is the lieutenant governor-elect following the 2026 election. A member of the Democratic Party, she was an assistant attorney general for Vermont from 2018 to 2021.

A native of Newbury, Vermont, Gray graduated from the University of Vermont (BA, 2006), Vermont Law School (JD, 2014), and the Graduate Institute of International and Development Studies (LLM, 2016). While in college, she interned in U.S. Senator Patrick Leahy's Burlington office. She was active in Peter Welch's successful 2006 U.S. House campaign, then joined his staff after he took office in 2007. Gray subsequently worked on human rights issues for the International Committee of the Red Cross. After law school, she worked for the International Code of Conduct for Private Security Service Providers, an organization created to monitor the human rights compliance of private security contractors.

In August 2018, Gray was hired as an assistant attorney general in the Vermont Attorney General's Criminal Division. She also taught a course on international human rights law at Vermont Law School. In early 2020, Gray announced her candidacy for lieutenant governor. In the August primary, she defeated better-known state senators Tim Ashe and Debbie Ingram for the Democratic nomination. In the November general election, she defeated Republican nominee Scott Milne 51.3% to 44.2%, becoming the first Democrat to hold the office since Doug Racine left office in 2003.

In 2022, Gray ran for the U.S. House of Representatives, seeking to represent Vermont's at-large congressional district. She lost the Democratic primary election to Becca Balint.

== Early life and education ==
Gray was born in Newbury, Vermont, on March 18, 1984. Her parents were skiers.

Gray attended the schools of Newbury and Bradford's Oxbow High School, and graduated from Stratton Mountain School in 2002. She studied at the University of Vermont (UVM) on an athletic scholarship and competed for the Vermont Catamounts in cross-country skiing. Gray earned a Bachelor of Arts degree in area and international studies from UVM in 2006 and a Juris Doctor from Vermont Law School (VLS) in 2014. She also earned a Master of Laws in international law from the Graduate Institute of International and Development Studies in 2016.

== Early career ==
While in college, Gray served as an intern in Patrick Leahy's Vermont office. She then worked on Peter Welch's 2006 campaign for the U.S. House of Representatives, and became a member of his Congressional staff after he was elected. She later worked for the International Committee of the Red Cross, where she engaged the U.S. government on humanitarian issues and led field missions to Haiti, Uganda, Georgia, the Western Balkans, and the Democratic Republic of the Congo.

Gray graduated from Vermont Law School in 2014 and worked as a law clerk for Judge Peter W. Hall of the United States Court of Appeals for the Second Circuit. In August 2018, state Attorney General T. J. Donovan hired her as an assistant attorney general in the Criminal Division. Gray has also taught a course on international human rights law at Vermont Law School.

== Political career ==
=== 2020 Vermont elections ===
Gray announced her campaign for lieutenant governor in early 2020. She defeated Tim Ashe and Debbie Ingram in the Democratic primary on August 11, 2020. Gray faced Republican businessman Scott Milne in the November 3 general election. One major campaign issue was whether Gray met the four-year residency requirement the state constitution mandates for the lieutenant governor; most legal and political observers agreed that she did. A related issue was that Gray had not voted between 2008 and 2018. Milne also admitted to not having voted in some elections, but characterized himself as a consistent voter and Gray as an inconsistent one. Gray won the election with 51.3% of the vote.

=== Lieutenant governor ===
Gray took office in January 2021, becoming the fourth woman to serve as Vermont's lieutenant governor and the first Democrat to hold the office in 18 years. Within months of taking office, she hired a nearly full-time political staffer. While Gray had a chief of staff in the lieutenant governor's office to aid with official duties, she said she had also hired a full-time political assistant to aid her in keeping "a clear distinction between official work and political things that may come up from time to time". Some Vermont political observers suggested Gray was a likely candidate for the U.S. Senate or U.S. House. Gray discounted such speculation, saying she was focused on her work as lieutenant governor.

As lieutenant governor, Gray virtually hosted classrooms at the Vermont State House so schoolchildren could experience being "lieutenant governor for a day". Through her "Seat at the Table" meeting series, she met with local leaders to discuss issues facing Vermont, from equity in access to health care and broadband to women's economic well-being and how to tackle climate change. She toured the state throughout 2021, visiting all 14 counties for her "Recover Stronger" initiative.

=== 2026 Vermont elections ===
In November 2025, Gray announced that she would run again for lieutenant governor.

== U.S. House campaign ==
In December 2021, Gray announced her candidacy for Vermont's at-large congressional district in the United States House of Representatives in 2022. The seat was held by Peter Welch, who in November announced his candidacy for the United States Senate seat of Patrick Leahy, who was not seeking reelection in 2022.

Gray was endorsed by former Vermont Governors Madeleine Kunin and Howard Dean, as well as Marcelle Leahy, Senator Leahy's wife. Leahy declined to formally endorse Gray, but indicated that he had voted for her. She lost the Democratic primary to Becca Balint, the president pro tempore of the Vermont Senate, 59.6% to 36.4%.

== Electoral history ==
2020 Democratic primary, Vermont Lieutenant Governor
Party	Candidate	Votes	%
Democratic	Molly Gray	47,636	46.0
Democratic	Tim Ashe	35,954	34.7
Democratic	Brenda Siegel	9,945	9.6
Democratic	Debbie Ingram	9,466	9.1
Write-in	Write-ins	568	0.5
Total votes		103,645	100

2020 general election, Vermont Lieutenant Governor
Party	Candidate	Votes	%
Democratic	Molly Gray	182,820	51.3
Republican	Scott Milne	157,065	44.1
Progressive	Cris Ericson	7,862	2.2
Independent	Wayne Billado III	5,101	1.4
Stop the F35s	Ralph Corbo	2,289	0.6
Write-in	Write-ins	1,097	0.3
Total votes		356,234	100

2022 Democratic primary, United States House of Representatives
Party	Candidate	Votes	%
Democratic	Becca Balint	61,025	60.6
Democratic	Molly Gray	37,266	37.0
Democratic	Louis Meyers	1,593	1.6
Democratic	Sianay Chase Clifford (withdrawn)	885	0.9
Total votes		100,769	100

2026 Democratic primary, Vermont Lieutenant Governor
Party	Candidate	Votes	%
Democratic	Molly Gray	50,884	60.78
Democratic	Ryan McLaren	23,111	27.61
Democratic	Esther Charlestin	9,135	10.91
Write-in		587	0.70
Total votes		83,717	100.00

== Continued career ==
In May 2023, the Vermont Afghan Alliance, a Burlington-based nonprofit that supports Afghans who are resettling in the state, announced that Gray would serve as its interim executive director.

== Personal life ==
Gray is married to Michael David Palm and they are the parents of a son who was born in 2023.

Party political offices
Preceded by David Zuckerman	Democratic nominee for Lieutenant Governor of Vermont; 2020	Succeeded by David Zuckerman
Preceded by David Zuckerman	Democratic nominee for Lieutenant Governor of Vermont; 2026	Most recent
Political offices
Preceded by David Zuckerman	Lieutenant Governor of Vermont; 2021–2023	Succeeded by David Zuckerman
Preceded by John S. Rodgers	Lieutenant Governor of Vermont; Taking office 2027	Elect
