= 2026 Vermont Auditor of Accounts election =

- November 3, 2026
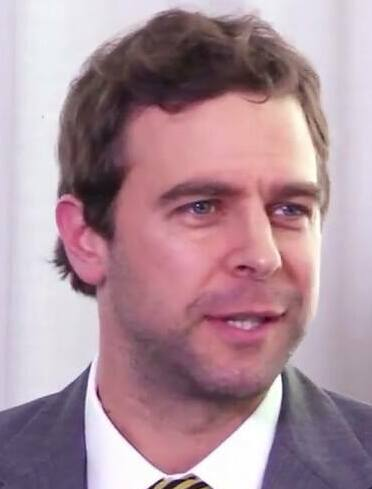

Nominee	Tim Ashe	Ivar Kronick (replacing H. Brooke Paige)
Party	Democratic	Republican
Popular vote	203,376	90,687
Percentage	69.09%	30.81%
Auditor of Accounts before election
Doug Hoffer
Democratic
Elected Auditor of Accounts
Tim Ashe
Democratic

The 2026 Vermont Auditor of Accounts election was held on November 3, 2026, to elect the Vermont Auditor of Accounts. Primary elections were held on August 11. Six-term incumbent auditor Doug Hoffer retired.

Democratic nominee Tim Ashe defeated Republican nominee Ivar Kronick with 69.1% of the vote.

== Democratic primary ==
=== Candidates ===
==== Nominee ====
- Tim Ashe, former president pro tempore of the Vermont Senate (2017–2021) from the Chittenden district (2009–2021) and candidate for lieutenant governor in 2020

==== Eliminated in primary ====
- Nick Graeter, golf business owner
- Dan Towle

==== Declined ====
- Doug Hoffer, incumbent state auditor (endorsed Ashe)

=== Endorsements ===
Tim Ashe

Statewide officials

- Doug Hoffer, incumbent state auditor (2013–present)

Labor unions

- Vermont State Labor Council, AFL-CIO

Organizations

- Sierra Club Vermont

Political parties

- Vermont Progressive Party

=== Results ===
Democratic primary results
Party	Candidate	Votes	%
Democratic	Tim Ashe	53,082	74.9
Democratic	Nick Graeter	8,897	12.6
Democratic	Dan Towle	8,532	12.0
Write-in		362	0.5
Total votes		70,872	100.0

== Republican primary ==
=== Candidates ===
==== Nominee ====
- Ivar Kronick, accounts assistant

==== Withdrew after nomination ====
- H. Brooke Paige, newsstand owner and perennial candidate

=== Results ===
Republican primary results
Party	Candidate	Votes	%
Republican	H. Brooke Paige	16,870	96.7
Write-in		570	3.3
Total votes		17,440	100.0

=== Post-primary ===
H. Brooke Paige, who also won the Republican nominations for state Attorney General, state Secretary of State, and state Treasurer, withdrew from all but the secretary of state race on August 19, in order to allow the Vermont Republican Party to name replacement candidates. The Vermont Republican Party picked Ivar Kronick to be the Republican nominee for Auditor of Accounts.

== General election ==
=== Results ===
2026 Vermont Auditor of Accounts election
Party	Candidate	Votes	%	±%
Democratic	Tim Ashe	203,376	69.09	+8.47
Republican	Ivar Kronick	90,687	30.81	−8.09
Write-in		299	0.10	
Total votes		294,362	100.0	
Democratic hold				
