= Lisa Senecal =

American writer and activist

Lisa Senecal is an American writer, communications consultant, and advocate based in Stowe, Vermont. She is founding editor of Lincoln Square, a political Substack publication, and previously served as chair of the Vermont Commission on Women. She is known for her writing and advocacy on workplace sexual harassment, including her role in shaping Vermont's 2018 sexual harassment law.

== Early life ==
Senecal is a fourth-generation Vermonter who grew up in Orange, Vermont, and lives in Stowe.

== Career ==
Senecal is a co-founder of The Maren Group, a communications and marketing firm that works with clients on issues including workplace discrimination and sexual harassment.

She has worked as a columnist for VTDigger and her writing has appeared in The Daily Beast, the New York Daily News, and USA Today. She co-hosted "We're Speaking" on Lincoln Project Television with Maya May beginning in 2021. Senecal is a founding editor of Lincoln Square, a political media project on Substack associated with The Lincoln Project and other anti-Trump commentators including Rick Wilson and Joe Trippi.

== Vermont Commission on Women ==
In 2017, Senecal was appointed by Governor Phil Scott to the Vermont Commission on Women, a non-partisan state commission. She was elected chair of the Commission in June 2019 and subsequently served as one of three co-chairs alongside Kiah Morris and Kellie B. Campbell. She has also served on the board of the Clarina Howard Nichols Center, a Vermont organization serving survivors of domestic violence.

== #MeToo case and Vermont harassment law ==
In June 2018, Senecal published a first-person account in The Daily Beast describing sexual harassment and assault she said she had experienced in February 2017 during a job interview process with Craig DeLuca, then-president and chief operating officer of the Stowe-based software company Inntopia. The article, titled "The NDA Protected Our Predator. I'm Breaking My Silence, Because Women Deserve Better," disclosed the existence of a 2017 settlement that had included a non-disclosure agreement. VTDigger reported that DeLuca had resigned from Inntopia in June 2017 after an internal investigation, and that a second woman, Alison Miley, subsequently filed a lawsuit making similar allegations.

Senecal worked with Vermont State Representative Sarah Copeland Hanzas in support of H.707, a 2018 bill addressing workplace sexual harassment. She provided testimony before the Vermont legislature in April 2018 and participated in public discussion of the legislation alongside Copeland Hanzas. The bill, which Governor Scott signed on May 30, 2018, and which took effect July 1, 2018, banned certain non-disclosure provisions and "no-rehire" clauses in harassment settlements and was covered nationally by PBS NewsHour as a notable state-level response to the Me Too movement.
