= Senator Chittenden =

Senator Chittenden may refer to:

- Lucius E. Chittenden (1824–1900), Vermont State Senate
- Thomas Chittenden (Vermont state senator) (born 1977), Vermont State Senate

== See also ==
- John J. Crittenden (1787–1863), U.S. Senator from Kentucky from 1817 to 1819, 1835 to 1841, 1842 to 1848, and 1855 to 1861
