= Brian Cina =

American politician

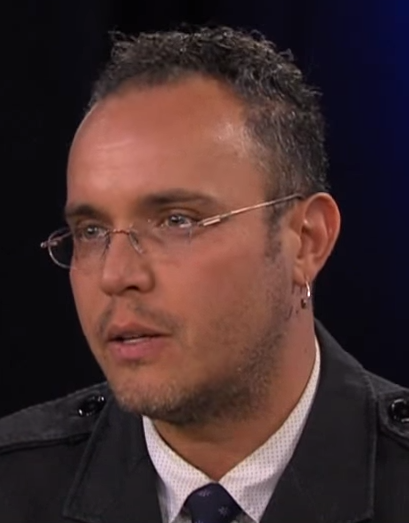

Member of the Vermont House of Representatives
- Incumbent
- Assumed office January 6, 2017 Serving with Selene Colburn (2017–2023); Troy Headrick (2023–Present)
- Preceded by: Christopher Pearson; Kesha Ram Hinsdale
- Constituency: Chittenden-6-4 (2017–2023); Chittenden-15 (2023–Present)

Personal details
- Born: Hackensack, New Jersey, U.S.
- Party: Vermont Progressive
- Other political affiliations: Democratic
- Education: Dartmouth College (BA); University of Vermont (MSW)

Brian Cina is an American politician who serves in the Vermont House of Representatives from the Chittenden-6-4 district as a member of the Vermont Progressive Party. Prior to his tenure in the state house he was active in local politics in Burlington, Vermont.

== Early life and education ==
Cina was born in Hackensack, New Jersey, and raised in nearby Lodi. He was valedictorian of his graduating class at Lodi High School in 1994. He graduated from Dartmouth College with a Bachelor of Arts in music in 1998. He moved to Burlington, Vermont afterwards and worked for AmeriCorps. He attended the University of Vermont from 2003 to 2005, earning a master of social work degree.

== Career ==
=== Local politics ===
Cina was elected to the school board from the 2nd district in Burlington in the 2014 election. He won reelection to the school board from the Central district in the 2015 election. He did not seek reelection in 2017. During his tenure on the school board he led a committee to find an interim superintendent.

Cina supported Max Tracy during the 2021 Burlington mayoral election.

=== Vermont House of Representatives ===
Representatives Chris Pearson, a member of the Progressive Party, and Kesha Ram, a member of the Democratic Party, declined to run for reelection to the Vermont House of Representatives in 2016. Cina ran for a seat in the state house from the Chittenden-6-4 district in the 2018 election with the nominations of the Democratic and Progressive parties and won in the general election alongside Selene Colburn. He and Colburn were reelection in the 2018 and 2020 elections.

== Political positions ==
Cina and Representatives Diana Gonzalez and Colburn wrote an open letter calling for at least twenty percent of Vermont's police budget to be diverted to other services. The state house voted eighty-nine to fifty-eight, with Cina in favor, in favor of raising the minimum wage and creating a paid family leave program.

== Electoral history ==
Brian Cina electoral history

2014 Burlington, Vermont school board 2nd district election
Party	Candidate	Votes	%
Progressive	Brian Cina	446	97.17%
Write-in		13	2.83%
Total votes		459	100.00%

2015 Burlington, Vermont school board Central district election
Party	Candidate	Votes	%
Progressive	Brian Cina (incumbent)	613	53.03%
Democratic	Charlie Giannon	530	45.85%
Write-in		13	1.12%
Total votes		1,156	100.00%
	Blank	282	

2016 Vermont House of Representatives Chittenden-6-4 district Democratic primary
Party	Candidate	Votes	%
Democratic	Selene Colburn	575	47.09%
Democratic	Brian Cina	378	30.96%
Democratic	Carmen Scoles	264	21.62%
Write-in		4	0.33%
Total votes		1,221	100.00%

2016 Vermont House of Representatives Chittenden-6-4 district election
Party	Candidate	Votes	%
Progressive	Selene Colburn		
Democratic	Selene Colburn		
Total	Selene Colburn	1,691	52.37%
Progressive	Brian Cina		
Democratic	Brian Cina		
Total	Brian Cina	1,506	46.64%
Write-in		32	0.99%
Total votes		3,229	100.00%
	Blank	1,633	

2018 Vermont House of Representatives Chittenden-6-4 district Democratic primary
Party	Candidate	Votes	%	±%
Democratic	Selene Colburn (incumbent)	575	56.15%	+9.06%
Democratic	Brian Cina (incumbent)	378	36.91%	+5.95%
Write-in		9	0.88%	+0.55%
Total votes		1,024	100.00%	
	Blank	304		

2018 Vermont House of Representatives Chittenden-6-4 district election
Party	Candidate	Votes	%	±%
Progressive	Selene Colburn (incumbent)			
Democratic	Selene Colburn (incumbent)			
Total	Selene Colburn (incumbent)	2,199	52.92%	+0.55%
Progressive	Brian Cina (incumbent)			
Democratic	Brian Cina (incumbent)			
Total	Brian Cina (incumbent)	1,936	46.59%	-0.05%
Write-in		20	0.48%	-0.51%
Total votes		4,155	100.00%	
	Blank	1,335		

2020 Vermont House of Representatives Chittenden-6-4 district Democratic primary
Party	Candidate	Votes	%	±%
Democratic	Selene Colburn (incumbent)	904	53.15%	−3.00%
Democratic	Brian Cina (incumbent)	778	45.74%	+8.83%
Write-in		19	1.12%	+0.24%
Total votes		1,701	100.00%	
	Blank	520		
	Spoiled	1		

2020 Vermont House of Representatives Chittenden-6-4 district election
Party	Candidate	Votes	%	±%
Progressive	Selene Colburn (incumbent)			
Democratic	Selene Colburn (incumbent)			
Total	Selene Colburn (incumbent)	2,147	52.92%	±0.00%
Progressive	Brian Cina (incumbent)			
Democratic	Brian Cina (incumbent)			
Total	Brian Cina (incumbent)	1,858	45.80%	-0.79%
Write-in		52	1.28%	+0.80%
Total votes		4,057	100.00%	
	Blank	1,677		

2022 Vermont House of Representatives Chittenden-15 district Democratic primary
Party	Candidate	Votes	%	±%
Democratic	Brian Cina (incumbent)	834	54.47%	+1.32%
Democratic	Troy Headrick	680	44.42%	N/A
Write-in		17	1.11%	-0.01%
Total votes		1,531	100.00%	
	Blank	753		

2022 Vermont House of Representatives Chittenden-15 district election
Party	Candidate	Votes	%	±%
Progressive	Brian Cina (incumbent)			
Democratic	Brian Cina (incumbent)			
Total	Brian Cina (incumbent)	1,858	52.86%	-0.06%
Progressive	Troy Headrick			
Democratic	Troy Headrick			
Total	Troy Headrick	1,604	45.63%	N/A
Write-in		53	1.51%	+0.23%
Total votes		3,515	100.00%	
	Blank	1,285		

2024 Vermont House of Representatives Chittenden-15 district Democratic primary
Party	Candidate	Votes	%	±%
Democratic	Brian Cina (incumbent)	442	50.98%	+2.75%
Democratic	Troy Headrick (incumbent)	409	47.17%	−3.49%
Write-in		16	1.85%	+0.74%
Total votes		867	100.00%	
	Blank	245		

2024 Vermont House of Representatives Chittenden-15 district election
Party	Candidate	Votes	%	±%
Progressive	Brian Cina (incumbent)			
Democratic	Brian Cina (incumbent)			
Total	Brian Cina (incumbent)	2,124	52.12%	-0.74%
Progressive	Troy Headrick (incumbent)			
Democratic	Troy Headrick (incumbent)			
Total	Troy Headrick (incumbent)	1,898	46.58%	+0.95%
Write-in		53	1.30%	-0.21%
Total votes		4,075	100.00%	
	Blank	2,097		
