= Taylor Small =

American politician

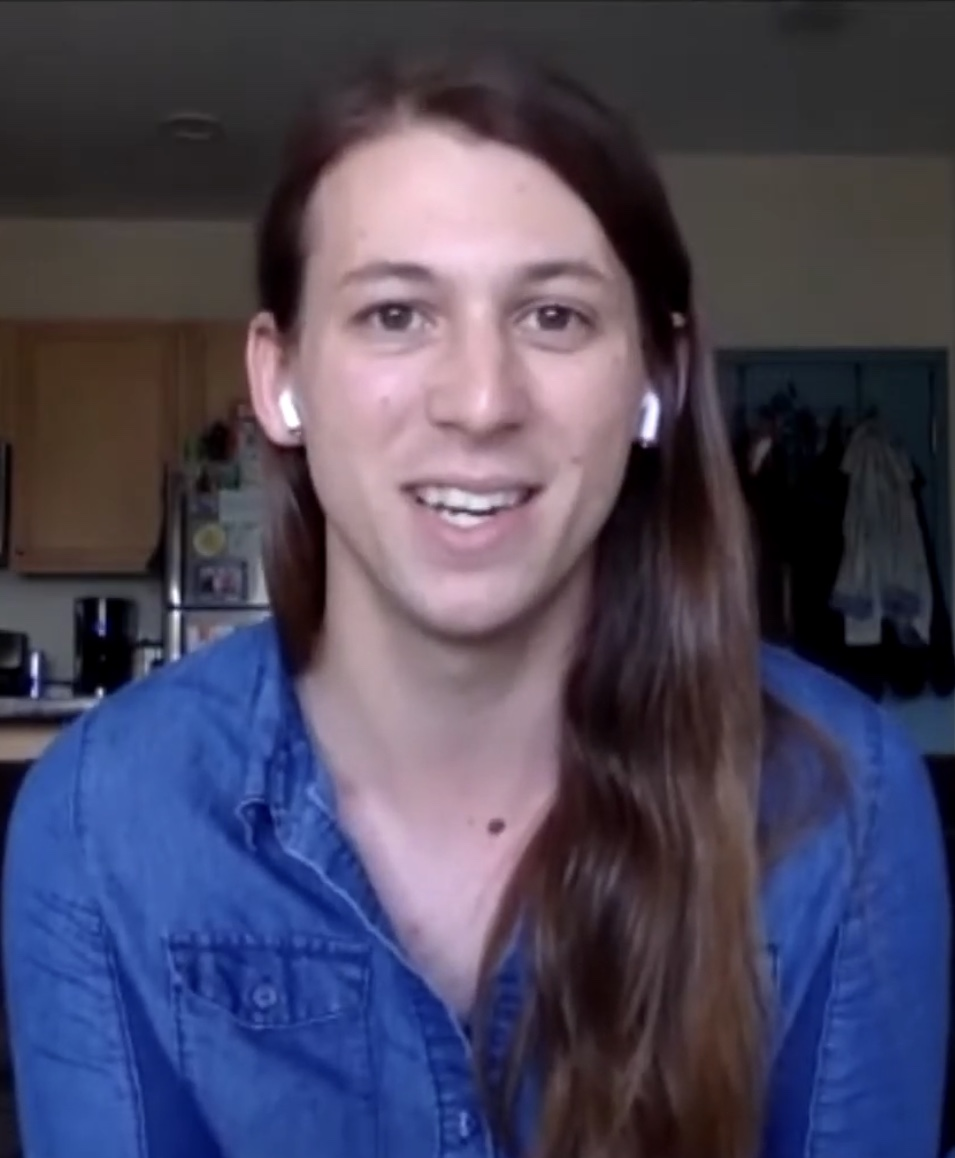
- Small in 2020

Member of the Vermont House of Representatives from the Chittenden-21 district
- In office January 4, 2023 – January 8, 2025 Serving with Daisy Berbeco
- Preceded by: Redistricted
- Succeeded by: Chloe Tomlinson

Member of the Vermont House of Representatives from the Chittenden 6-7 district
- In office January 6, 2021 – January 4, 2023 Serving with Hal Colston

Personal details
- Born: Portland, Maine, U.S.
- Party: Democratic; Progressive
- Education: University of Vermont (BS)
- Website: Campaign website

Taylor Small is an American politician. Small was a member of the Vermont House of Representatives from 2021 until 2025. She was the first openly transgender legislator elected in Vermont and the 5th elected in the United States.

== Early life and education ==
Small was born in Portland, Maine to Canadian parents. She lived in Johnson, Vermont, and then Western Massachusetts as a child.

Small returned to Vermont with her mother upon her parents' divorce and attended Colchester High School and Burlington Technical Center. Small then went on to graduate from the University of Vermont in 2016 with a Bachelor of Science in Human Development and Family Studies with a minor in Sexuality and Gender Identity Studies.

== Career ==
Small was elected to the Vermont House of Representatives in the 2020 general election after the incumbent Diana Gonzalez retired and is the state's first openly transgender legislator, and the fifth in the nation. Small ran on both the Democratic ticket and Vermont Progressive Party ticket and won with 41% of the vote.

Small is the education manager (and former director of the Health and Wellness program) at Pride Center of Vermont and has worked with the Vermont Department of Health. Prior to that, Small worked in mental health at Howard Center and Northwestern Counseling and Support Services and supported homeless and runaway youth with Spectrum Youth and Family Services. Through a drag persona, Nikki Champagne, along with colleague Emoji Nightmare, Small has promoted local libraries and youth literacy and hosted fundraisers to help support Vermont’s non-profit organizations.

Small was named a 2022 Politician of Year by One Young World, receiving the award in Manchester, England in September 2022 alongside four other young politicians from around the world. Small retired from the House in 2024 in order to focus on her work at the University of Vermont Medical Center.

== Personal life ==
Small lives in Winooski with her partner, Carsen, and their dogs, Theobroma and Charlie.

== Electoral history ==
=== 2020 ===
Vermont House of Representatives Chittenden 6-7 district Democratic primary, 2020
Party	Candidate	Votes	%
Democratic	Taylor Small	1,003	44.9
Democratic	Hal Colston (incumbent)	912	40.8
Democratic	Jordan Matte	316	14.1
Democratic	Write-ins	4	0.2
Total votes		2,235	100.0

Vermont House of Representatives Chittenden 6-7 district general election, 2020
Party	Candidate	Votes	%
Democratic	Hal Colston (incumbent)	2,551	43.5
Progressive/Democratic	Taylor Small	2,423	41.3
Independent	James Ehlers	867	14.8
Write-in	Write-ins	28	0.5
Total votes		5,869	100.0

=== 2022 ===
Vermont House of Representatives Chittenden-21 district Democratic primary, 2022
Party	Candidate	Votes	%
Progressive	Taylor Small (incumbent)	1,011	53.0
Democratic	Daisy Berbeco	883	46.3
Democratic	Write-ins	13	0.7
Total votes		1,907	100.0

Vermont House of Representatives Chittenden-21 district general election, 2022
Party	Candidate	Votes	%
Democratic	Daisy Berbeco	1,813	43.6
Progressive/Democratic	Taylor Small (incumbent)	1,735	41.7
Independent	Jordan Matte	575	13.8
Write-in	Write-ins	38	0.9
Total votes		4,161	100.0

== See also ==
- List of transgender public officeholders in the United States
