= Hal Colston =

American politician

Member of the Vermont House of Representatives from the Chittenden 6-7 district
- In office 2019–2023 Serving with Taylor Small
- Preceded by: Clement Bissonnette
- Succeeded by: Daisy Berbeco

Personal details
- Party: Democratic

Hal Colston is an American Democratic politician who represented Chittenden-6-7 district in the Vermont House of Representatives from 2019 until 2023. He retired from the house before the 2022 Vermont House of Representatives election.
