= John F. Campbell (politician) =

American politician from Vermont

John Campbell

80th President pro tempore of the Vermont Senate
- In office January 5, 2011 – January 6, 2017
- Preceded by: Peter Shumlin
- Succeeded by: Tim Ashe

Majority Leader of the Vermont Senate
- In office January 5, 2003 – January 5, 2011
- Succeeded by: Bill Carris

Member of the Vermont Senate from the Windsor district
- In office January 5, 2001 – January 6, 2017
- Preceded by: Multi-member district
- Succeeded by: Alison Clarkson

Personal details
- Born: March 3, 1954 (age 72) New Hyde Park, New York, U.S.
- Party: Democratic
- Spouse: Kathleen
- Children: John; Meghan; Ryan
- Education: University of Florida; Nova Southeastern University

John F. Campbell (born March 3, 1954) is an American politician from Vermont. Campbell, a Democrat, was a member of the Vermont Senate, representing the Windsor Vermont Senate District since 2001. He was the Senate Majority Leader of the Vermont Senate from 2003 to January 5, 2011, when he was elected President pro tempore of the Vermont Senate for the legislative session. He was succeeded by Tim Ashe of the Vermont Progressive Party in 2017.
