= 2024 Vermont gubernatorial election =

- November 5, 2024
- Turnout: 72.12% (▲14.50 pp)
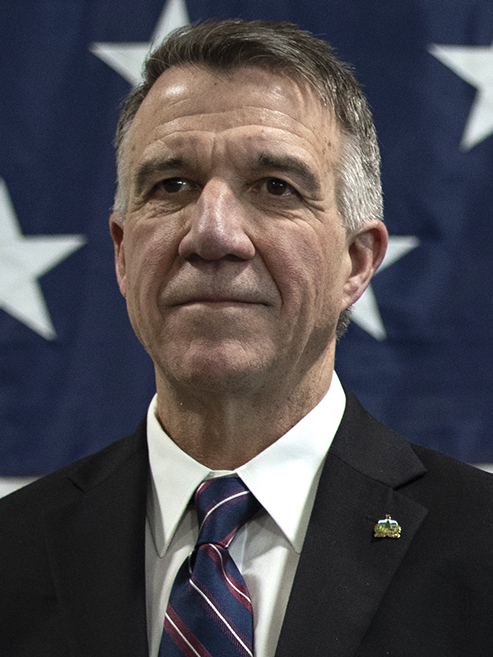

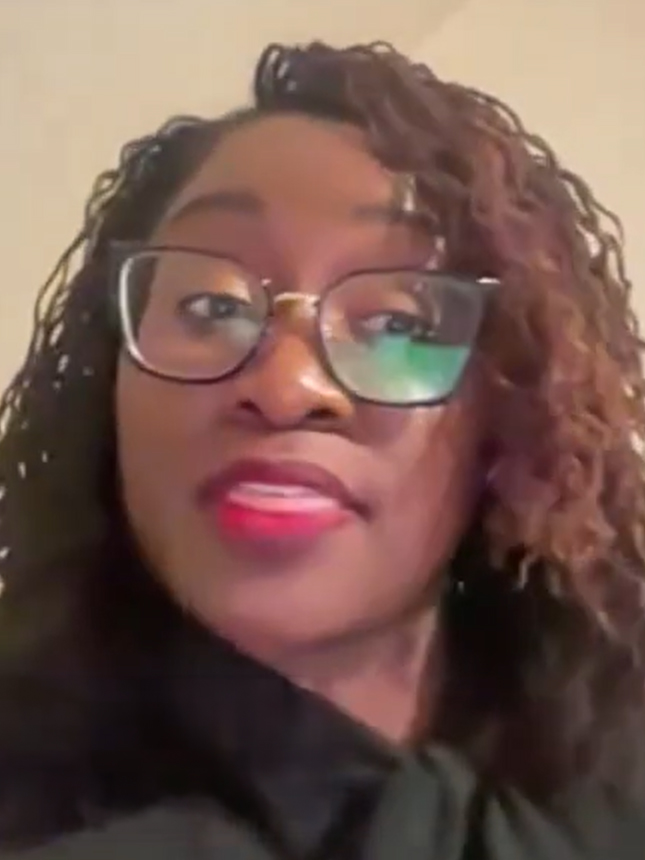
Nominee	Phil Scott	Esther Charlestin
Party	Republican	Democratic
Alliance		Progressive
Popular vote	266,439	79,217
Percentage	73.43%	21.83%
- Scott: 40–50% 50–60% 60–70% 70–80% 80–90% >90% No votes
Governor before election
Phil Scott
Republican
Elected Governor
Phil Scott
Republican

The 2024 Vermont gubernatorial election was held on November 5, 2024, to elect the governor of Vermont, concurrently with the 2024 U.S. presidential election, as well as elections to the United States Senate and elections to the United States House of Representatives and various state and local elections. Incumbent Republican governor Phil Scott won re-election to a fifth term, defeating the Democratic nominee, Vermont Commission on Women co-chair Esther Charlestin. Primary elections took place on August 13, 2024.

Being frequently ranked as the nation's most popular governor, Scott had won re-election by continually increasing margins since his first election in 2016. Despite Vermont's strong Democratic lean at the presidential level, Scott was expected to easily win again in 2024.

Along with New Hampshire, this race was one of two Republican-held governorships up for election in 2024 in a state carried by Joe Biden in the 2020 presidential election. This was the best Republican performance in a Vermont gubernatorial election since 1946, with Scott winning every municipality in which votes were cast (as he did in 2022) and Scott's coattails allowed Republicans to break Democratic supermajorities in the state legislature. Scott also achieved over 60% of the vote in Windham County, a traditionally Democratic stronghold.

== Republican primary ==
=== Candidates ===
==== Nominee ====
- Phil Scott, incumbent governor (2017–present)

==== Withdrawn ====
- Peter Duval, former Underhill selectman and independent candidate for governor in 2022 (ran as a Democrat)

=== Results ===
Republican primary results
Party	Candidate	Votes	%
Republican	Phil Scott (incumbent)	23,173	92.75%
Republican	Undervotes (Note: Blank ballots)	1,357	5.43%
Write-in		448	1.79%
Republican	Overvotes	7	0.03%
Total votes		23,565	100.00%

== Democratic primary ==
=== Candidates ===
==== Nominee ====
- Esther Charlestin, co-chair of the Vermont Commission on Women and former Middlebury selectman

==== Eliminated in primary ====
- Peter Duval, former Underhill selectman and independent candidate for governor in 2022

==== Declined ====
- Howard Dean, former governor (1991–2003) and former chair of the Democratic National Committee (2005–2009)
- Caleb Elder, state representative (2018–2025) (running for state senate)
- Miro Weinberger, former mayor of Burlington (2012–2024)
- David Zuckerman, Lieutenant Governor of Vermont (2017–2021, 2023–2025) and nominee for governor in 2020 (running for re-election)

=== Endorsements ===
Esther Charlestin

Political parties

- Vermont Democratic Party

=== Results ===
Results by county: Charlestin: 40–50%; 50–60%; 60–70%

Democratic primary results
Party	Candidate	Votes	%
Democratic	Esther Charlestin	24,007	46.19%
Democratic	Undervotes	13,404	25.79%
Democratic	Peter Duval	9,377	18.04%
Republican	Phil Scott (write-in)	4,558	8.77%
Write-in	Misc. Write-ins	601	1.56%
Democratic	Overvotes	22	0.04%
Total votes		51,969	100%

== Progressive primary ==
=== Candidates ===
==== Withdrew after nomination ====
- Marielle Blais, speech-language pathologist and nominee for state auditor in 2022

==== Results ====
Progressive primary results
Party	Candidate	Votes	%
Progressive	Marielle Blais	268	64.73%
Progressive	Undervotes	71	17.11%
Republican	Phil Scott (write-in)	35	8.45%
Democratic	Esther Charlestin (write-in)	21	5.07%
Write-in	Misc. Write-ins	19	4.59%
Total votes		414	100%

== Independent and third party candidates ==
=== Declared ===
- June Goodband (Green Mountain Peace and Justice Party), counselor
- Kevin Hoyt (Independent), videographer and perennial candidate
- Poa Mutino (Independent), program manager

== General election ==
=== Predictions ===
Source	Ranking	As of
The Cook Political Report	Solid R	June 13, 2024
Inside Elections	Solid R	July 14, 2023
Sabato's Crystal Ball	Safe R	June 4, 2024
RCP	Solid R	July 13, 2024
Elections Daily	Safe R	July 12, 2023
CNalysis	Solid R	August 17, 2024

=== Polling ===
Poll source	Date(s) administered	Sample size (Note: Key: A – all adults RV – registered voters LV – likely voters V – unclear)	Margin of error	Phil Scott (R)	Esther Charlestin (D)	Kevin Hoyt (I)	Other	Undecided
University of New Hampshire	October 29 – November 2, 2024	1,167 (LV)	± 2.9%	65%	26%	2%	2% (Note: "Other (Another Third Party/Write-In)" with 1%; Goodband (GMPaJ) with 1%)	4%
University of New Hampshire	August 15–19, 2024	924 (LV)	± 3.2%	56%	28%	5%	2% (Note: "Other (Another Third Party/Write-In)" with 2%; Goodband (GMPaJ) and Mutino (I) with 0%)	10%

=== Results ===

2024 Vermont gubernatorial election
Party	Candidate	Votes	%	±%
Republican	Phil Scott (incumbent)	266,439	73.43%	+2.52%
Democratic/Progressive	Esther Charlestin	79,217	21.83%	−2.11%
Independent	Kevin Hoyt	9,368	2.58%	+0.52%
Green Mountain Peace and Justice	June Goodband	4,512	1.24%	N/A
Independent	Eli "Poa" Mutino	2,414	0.67%	N/A
Write-in		891	0.25%	−0.21
Total votes		362,841	100.0%	
Republican hold				

==== By county ====
County	Phil Scott Republican		Esther Charlestin Democratic		Various candidates Other parties	
County	#	%	#	%	#	%
Addison	16,171	72.59%	5,375	24.13%	730	3.28%
Bennington	14,007	69.26%	4,292	21.22%	1,924	9.52%
Caledonia	12,947	78.94%	2,641	16.1%	814	4.96%
Chittenden	65,873	69.18%	26,237	27.55%	3,114	3.27%
Essex	2,773	82.33%	375	11.13%	220	6.54%
Franklin	21,960	82.8%	3,280	12.37%	1,282	4.83%
Grand Isle	4,050	81.75%	744	15.02%	160	3.23%
Lamoille	11,491	78.42%	2,565	17.5%	597	4.08%
Orange	13,348	76.34%	3,310	18.93%	828	4.73%
Orleans	11,966	82.35%	1,852	12.75%	712	4.9%
Rutland	26,849	79.84%	4,992	14.84%	1,787	5.32%
Washington	24,817	71.4%	8,377	24.1%	1,563	4.2%
Windham	15,715	62.51%	7,731	30.75%	1,693	6.74%
Windsor	24,472	72.66%	7,446	22.11%	1,761	5.23%
Totals	266,439	73.43%	79,217	21.83%	17,185	4.74%
