= Chittenden (Vermont Senate district) =

Coordinates: 44.443217°N 73.067579°W

The Chittenden district was one of 13 Vermont Senate districts included in the redistricting and reapportionment plan developed by the Vermont General Assembly. After the 2020 census, it was divided into three districts.

The Chittenden district included all of Chittenden County except the town of Colchester (which is in the Grand Isle district).

As of the 2000 census, the state as a whole had a population of 608,827. As there are a total of 30 senators, there were 20,294 residents per senator. The Chittenden district had a population of 129,585 in that same census. The district is apportioned six senators. This equals 21,598 residents per senator, 6.42% above the state average.

== District senators ==
2005-2006

- James C. Condos, Democrat
- Edward S. Flanagan, Democrat
- James P. Leddy, Democrat
- Virginia V. Lyons, Democrat
- Hinda Miller, Democrat
- Diane B. Snelling, Republican

2007-2008

- James C. Condos, Democrat
- Edward S. Flanagan, Democrat
- Virginia V. Lyons, Democrat
- Hinda Miller, Democrat
- Douglas A. Racine, Democrat
- Diane B. Snelling, Republican

2009-2010

- Tim Ashe, Progressive
- Edward S. Flanagan, Democrat
- Virginia V. Lyons, Democrat
- Hinda Miller, Democrat
- Douglas A. Racine, Democrat
- Diane B. Snelling, Republican

As of 2017

- Tim Ashe, Democrat/Progressive
- Philip Baruth, Democrat
- Debbie Ingram, Democrat
- Ginny Lyons, Democrat
- Christopher A. Pearson, Progressive/Democrat
- Michael Sirotkin, Democrat

As of 2020:

- Kesha Ram, Democrat
- Thomas Chittenden, Democrat
- Christopher Pearson, Progressive
- Michael Sirotkin, Democrat
- Philip Baruth, Democrat
- Virginia V. Lyons, Democrat

== Towns and cities in the Chittenden district, 2002–2012 elections ==
=== Chittenden County ===
- Bolton
- Buels Gore
- Burlington
- Charlotte
- Essex
- Hinesburg
- Huntington
- Jericho
- Milton
- Richmond
- Shelburne
- South Burlington
- St. George
- Underhill
- Westford
- Williston
- Winooski

== See also ==
- Members of the Vermont Senate, 2005–06 session
