= Daisy Berbeco =

American politician from Vermont

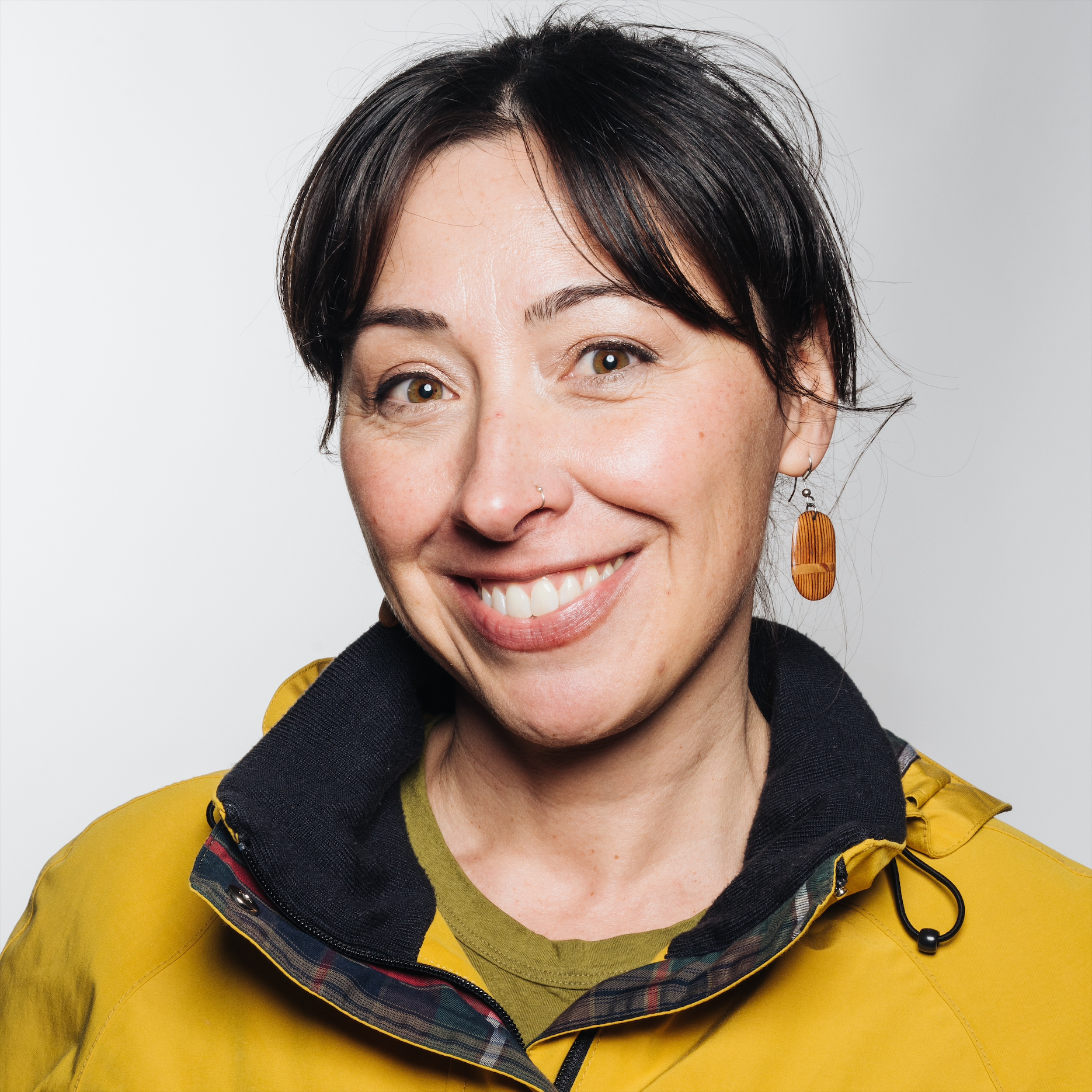
- Daisy Berbeco

Member of the Vermont House of Representatives from the Chittenden-21 district
- Incumbent
- Assumed office January 4, 2023 Serving with Taylor Small
- Preceded by: Hal Colston

Personal details
- Born: Alaska
- Party: Democratic
- Education: Sonoma State University; University of Sussex

Daisy Berbeco is an American politician from Vermont. She has been a Democratic member of the Vermont House of Representatives for the Chittenden-21 District since 2023. Berbeco is a member of the House Committee on Health Care.

Berbecos career has focused on mental health and substance use advocacy, policy and practice improvement. She spent six years at the National Council for Mental Wellbeing, a Washington, DC–based member association that represents more than one million mental health and substance use treatment providers. Berbeco is a former mental health policy adviser at the State of Vermont.

She has served as the Secretary for the Finance & Policy Division of the National Association of Mental Health Program Directors (NASMHPD) and was a member of Vermont's State Substance Misuse Prevention and Oversight Council and the Vermont Suicide Prevention Coalition.

In 2023 Berbeco was appointed to the Executive Board of the Urban Institutes Vermont Prison Reform and Innovation Network as well as the Vermont Judiciary Commission on Mental Health and the Courts and the Vermont Agency of Human Services Certified Community Behavioral Health Clinic (CCBHC) Steering Committee.

In 2024 Berbeco joined the National Academy for State Health Policy (NASHP), Behavioral Health, Aging, and Disability Steering Committee and the Behavioral Health Committee of the Conference of Chief Justices and the Conference of State Court Administrators.

She is also a Justice of the Peace in Winooski, Vermont (2022-) and on the Advisory Board of the Hopi Foundation's peer-run Substance Use Prevention Center on the Hopi Reservation, Arizona (2019-).

== Electoral history ==
=== 2022 ===
Vermont House of Representatives Chittenden-21 district Democratic primary, 2022
| Party | Candidate | Votes | % |
|---|---|---|---|
| Progressive | Taylor Small (incumbent) | 1,011 | 53.0 |
| Democratic | Daisy Berbeco | 883 | 46.3 |
| Democratic | Write-ins | 13 | 0.7 |
| Total votes | | 1,907 | 100.0 |

Vermont House of Representatives Chittenden-21 district general election, 2022
| Party | Candidate | Votes | % |
|---|---|---|---|
| Democratic | Daisy Berbeco | 1,813 | 43.6 |
| Progressive/Democratic | Taylor Small (incumbent) | 1,735 | 41.7 |
| Independent | Jordan Matte | 575 | 13.8 |
| Write-in | Write-ins | 38 | 0.9 |
| Total votes | | 4,161 | 100.0 |
