= Ryan McLaren (politician) =

American politician and athlete

- Born: Essex Junction, Vermont, U.S.
- Education: Wesleyan University
- Occupations: Political staffer, adaptive athlete
- Political party: Democratic
- Spouse: Adrienne Shea

Ryan McLaren is an American political staffer, former school board member, adaptive athlete, and Democratic candidate for Lieutenant Governor of Vermont in the 2026 Vermont lieutenant gubernatorial election. He worked for U.S. Senator Peter Welch, in Vermont state government, and on local school boards in Vermont. After sustaining a spinal cord injury in a 2017 skiing accident, he became involved in adaptive athletics, including handcycling.

== Early life and education ==
McLaren grew up in Essex Junction, Vermont. He attended Wesleyan University, where he majored in American studies and played football.

== Career ==
McLaren worked as a field organizer for the Vermont Democratic Party and in constituent services for Governor Peter Shumlin. He later worked in the Vermont Department of Motor Vehicles. Records of the Vermont General Assembly list him in 2014 as assistant to the commissioner of the Department of Motor Vehicles.

McLaren later worked for Peter Welch, including while Welch served in the U.S. House of Representatives and the U.S. Senate. In 2017, Seven Days described McLaren as an outreach representative in Welch's Burlington office. VTDigger later described him as a former top aide to Welch and reported that his work in Welch's office included campaign management, policy work, and constituent meetings.

McLaren served as an AmeriCorps VISTA member in Burlington public schools and coached boys' lacrosse at Burlington High School. He served on the Essex School Board and, in 2017, ran for the Central District seat on the Burlington School Board. Seven Days reported that McLaren was one of two candidates running unopposed for open Burlington School Board seats that year.

== Spinal cord injury and adaptive athletics ==
On March 17, 2017, McLaren sustained a spinal cord injury while skiing at Mad River Glen in Fayston, Vermont. According to Seven Days, he fractured his first lumbar vertebra after a fall on an intermediate trail, leaving him with little to no function below the knees and limited function between his waist and knees. The same article described him as a newly elected Burlington School Board member and a staffer for U.S. Representative Peter Welch at the time of the accident.

After the injury, McLaren became involved in adaptive sports, including handcycling. In 2024, WCAX reported that a Kelly Brush Foundation grant helped McLaren purchase a specialized handcycle for marathon competition. That year, NBC5/WPTZ reported that McLaren was preparing for his fourth Boston Marathon as a hand cyclist.

In 2025, The Valley Reporter covered a short film released by the High Fives Foundation about McLaren's return to skiing at Mad River Glen after his injury.

== 2026 lieutenant gubernatorial campaign ==
McLaren announced his candidacy for lieutenant governor of Vermont in January 2026. VTDigger reported that McLaren entered the Democratic primary against former lieutenant governor Molly Gray, while incumbent Republican lieutenant governor John Rodgers was expected to seek reelection. Seven Days reported that McLaren had served on school boards in Burlington and Essex and that the 2026 race was his first statewide campaign.

In March 2026, Seven Days reported that McLaren and Gray had raised nearly identical amounts in the Democratic primary, with McLaren reporting $156,032 in total contributions and Gray reporting $155,469. WCAX also reported that McLaren led the Democratic field in campaign contributions at that point, followed closely by Gray.

In April 2026, Seven Days reported that the Vermont Democratic Party apologized to McLaren after local party officials were incorrectly told that they could not endorse candidates in contested primaries.

== Personal life ==
McLaren is married to Adrienne Shea. As of 2026, he lived in Essex Junction, Vermont.
