= Esther Charlestin =

American educator and political candidate (born 1990)

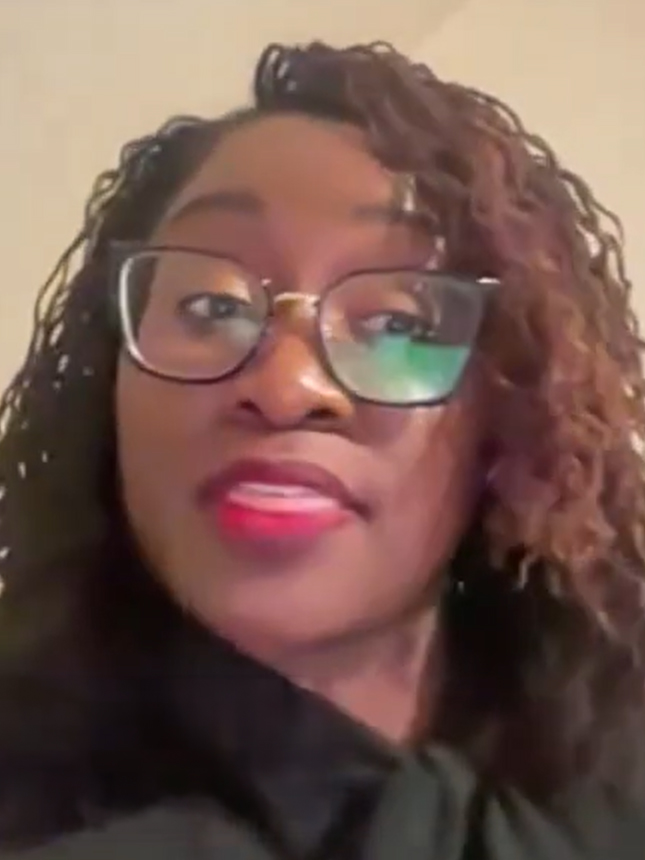
- Charlestin in 2024

Personal details
- Born: June 9, 1990 (age 36)
- Party: Democratic
- Education: Western Connecticut State University (BA); Sacred Heart University (MA, MEd)

Esther Ann Charlestin (born 1990) is an American educator and businesswoman, serving as the chair of the Vermont Commission on Women. A first-generation Haitian American, Charlestin was the Democratic nominee in the 2024 Vermont gubernatorial election.

She was supported in her gubernatorial bid by Vermont political figures including Howard Dean, Becca Balint, David Zuckerman, and Emma Mulvaney-Stanak, before losing to incumbent Phil Scott in the largest Republican landslide in the state since 1946.

Prior to running for Governor of Vermont, Charlestin was elected to the Middlebury Select Board in 2021 and 2022. Earlier, in 2019, she worked as a residence director at Middlebury College, and during the 2022–2023 school year, she served as Dean of Culture and Climate at Middlebury Union Middle School. She ultimately resigned from the latter position, citing experiences of racism.

In 2023, Charlestin founded Conversation Compass, a consultancy that helps individuals and organizations navigate conversations around culture, diversity, equity, and inclusion.

In 2026, Charlestin ran for the Democratic nomination for Lieutenant Governor of Vermont, but lost the nomination to former lieutenant governor Molly Gray.

== Political positions ==
=== Education ===
Charlestin advocates for a sustainable education system that eases the education tax burden for low and middle-income families.

=== Housing crisis ===
Charlestin stated affordable housing as a top priority and focused on working with local municipalities to allow for new construction.

=== Flood relief ===
Charlestin's policy platform for flood relief focused on promoting sustainable land use and managing stormwater run off.

== Electoral history ==
2024 Vermont gubernatorial election
Party	Candidate	Votes	%
Republican	Phil Scott (incumbent)	266,428	73.60
Democratic/Progressive	Esther Charlestin	79,217	21.88
Independent	Kevin Hoyt	9,362	2.59
Green Mountain Peace and Justice	June Goodband	4,511	1.25
Independent	Poa Mutino	2,414	0.67
Write-in		81	0.02
Total votes		362,013	100.00
Republican hold			

2024 Vermont Democratic Gubernatorial Primary Election Results
Candidate	Votes	%
Esther Charlestin	24,007	62.3
Peter Duval	9,377	24.3
Other/Write-in votes	5,159	13.4

Party political offices
Preceded by Brenda Siegel	Democratic nominee for Governor of Vermont; 2024	Succeeded by Amanda Janoo
Preceded by Brenda Siegel	Progressive nominee for Governor of Vermont; 2024	Succeeded by Amanda Janoo
