= Tim Ashe =

American politician from Vermont

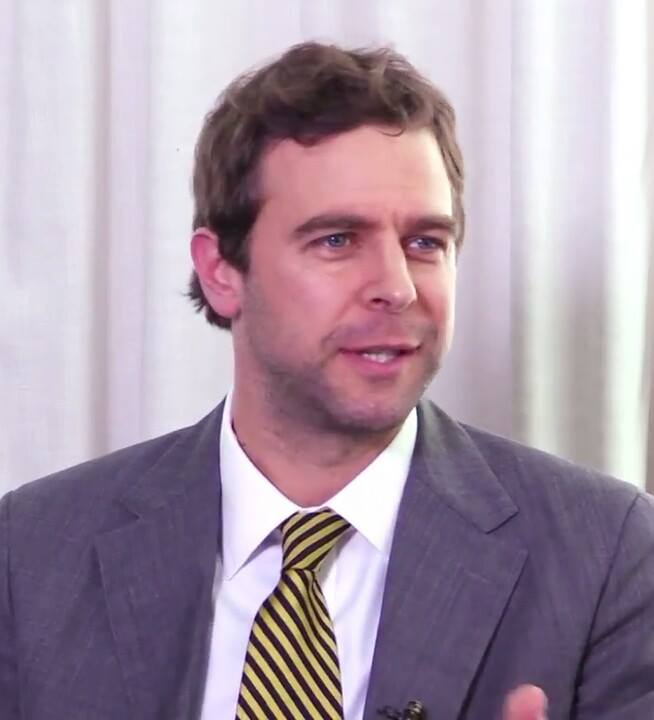
- Ashe in 2017

Auditor of Accounts-elect of Vermont
- Assuming office January 1, 2027
- Governor: Phil Scott
- Succeeding: Doug Hoffer

President pro tempore of the Vermont Senate
- In office January 6, 2017 – January 6, 2021
- Preceded by: John Campbell
- Succeeded by: Becca Balint

Member of the Vermont Senate from the Chittenden district
- In office January 5, 2009 – January 6, 2021
- Preceded by: Multi-member district
- Succeeded by: Thomas Chittenden; Kesha Ram Hinsdale

Member of the Burlington City Council from the 3rd ward
- In office 2004–2008
- Preceded by: Carina Driscoll
- Succeeded by: Marrisa Caldwell

Personal details
- Born: December 10, 1976 (age 49) Framingham, Massachusetts, U.S.
- Party: Democratic
- Other political affiliations: Progressive
- Spouse: Paula Routly
- Education: University of Vermont (BA); Harvard University (MPP)
- Website: Campaign website

Timothy R. Ashe (born December 10, 1976) is an American politician who is the Auditor of Accounts-elect of Vermont. He served as a Democrat/Progressive in the Vermont Senate from Chittenden County from 2009 to 2021 and as President pro tempore of the Vermont Senate from 2017 until 2021.

On January 2, 2026, Ashe announced that he would run for Vermont Auditor of Accounts. He won the general election defeating Republican Ivar Kronick.

== Personal life and early career ==
Ashe graduated from the University of Vermont in 1999 when he began working in then-Congressman Bernie Sanders’ Burlington office where he worked for two and a half years. In late 2001 Ashe took a position with United Academics, the faculty union at the University of Vermont.

From 2002 to 2004 Ashe attended Harvard Kennedy School at Harvard University. While there he concentrated his studies on domestic social policy. He also served as a teaching assistant to Ed Miliband, now a British MP and formerly the leader of the Labour Party, in a course comparing US and northern European social policy. Upon graduating Ashe returned to Vermont.

Ashe has served on the board of directors of Community Health Centers, Humane Society of Chittenden County, Spectrum Youth and Family Services, a community organization serving at-risk youth, and Housing Foundation, Inc., a non-profit affordable housing organization. He volunteered as a baseball coach in the Old North End's Center City Little League for two years.

He lives in Burlington with his partner, Paula Routly, owner and publisher of Burlington's Seven Days newspaper.

== Career and politics ==
In July 2004, Ashe successfully sought a seat on the Burlington City Council in a special election to replace Carina Driscoll. He won re-election in 2005 and 2007. Ashe became the youngest member of the Council when elected.

Ashe worked at the Champlain Valley Office of Economic Opportunity from 2005 to 2006. In the Fall of 2006, Ashe became a Project Manager at Cathedral Square, a non-profit developer of affordable housing for seniors and people with disabilities.

In November 2008 Ashe was elected to the Vermont Senate. He won on a Democratic/Progressive fusion ticket and was endorsed by Senator Bernie Sanders. He won re-election in 2010, 2012, 2014, 2016, and 2018.

In October 2011 Ashe declared himself a candidate for Mayor of Burlington running again on a Democratic/Progressive fusion ticket. While seeking the Democratic nomination for Mayor on November 13, 2011, Ashe tied Miro Weinberger in the party caucus, with each receiving 540 votes after three rounds. This resulted in a second caucus, which took place on December 11, 2011. Weinberger won, 655 votes to 533, and went on to win the general election.

In January 2017, Ashe was elected President Pro Tempore of the Vermont Senate by his fellow senators. While in office he served on the Senate Appropriations and Judiciary Committees. On July 23, 2019, Ashe endorsed Bernie Sanders for president, but Sanders lost the nomination to Joe Biden, who won the November 2020 general election.

On January 14, 2020, he announced his candidacy for Lieutenant Governor of Vermont. He went on to lose the Democratic primary to Molly Gray, a political newcomer running for office for the first time. Gray received 46% of the vote, and Ashe received 35%.

In April 2021, Doug Hoffer, the Vermont State Auditor, announced that he had hired Ashe as his deputy. Ashe succeeded Andrew Stein, who left the deputy auditor's post for a position with the Vermont Department of Taxes.

In 2026, Tim Ashe announced he would run to succeed Hoffer upon the latter's retirement. In August, he won the Democratic primary.

Vermont Senate
Preceded by John Campbell	President pro tempore of the Vermont Senate; 2017–2021	Succeeded by Becca Balint
