= Troy Headrick =

American politician from Vermont

- Headrick in 2026

Member of the Vermont House of Representatives from the Chittenden-15 District district
- Incumbent
- Assumed office January 4, 2023

Personal details
- Born: Manitowoc, Wisconsin
- Party: Independent
- Other political affiliations: Vermont Progressive Party (2022-2025)
- Education: University of Wisconsin–La Crosse; Colorado State University

Troy Headrick is an American politician from Vermont. He has been a member of the Vermont House of Representatives for the Chittenden-15 District since 2023.

Headrick was born in Manitowoc, Wisconsin and served as assistant director for Community Standards at the University of Vermont since 2009.

In January 2025, changed his party affiliation from Vermont Progressive Party to Independent.

== Electoral history ==
2022 Vermont House of Representatives Chittenden-15 district Democratic primary
Party	Candidate	Votes	%	±%
Democratic	Brian Cina (incumbent)	834	54.47%	+1.32%
Democratic	Troy Headrick	680	44.42%	N/A
Write-in		17	1.11%	-0.01%
Total votes		1,531	100.00%	
	Blank	753		

2022 Vermont House of Representatives Chittenden-15 district election
Party	Candidate	Votes	%	±%
Progressive	Brian Cina (incumbent)			
Democratic	Brian Cina (incumbent)			
Total	Brian Cina (incumbent)	1,858	52.86%	-0.06%
Progressive	Troy Headrick			
Democratic	Troy Headrick			
Total	Troy Headrick	1,604	45.63%	N/A
Write-in		53	1.51%	+0.23%
Total votes		3,515	100.00%	
	Blank	1,285		

2024 Vermont House of Representatives Chittenden-15 district Democratic primary
Party	Candidate	Votes	%	±%
Democratic	Brian Cina (incumbent)	442	50.98%	+2.75%
Democratic	Troy Headrick (incumbent)	409	47.17%	−3.49%
Write-in		16	1.85%	+0.74%
Total votes		867	100.00%	
	Blank	245		

2024 Vermont House of Representatives Chittenden-15 district election
Party	Candidate	Votes	%	±%
Progressive	Brian Cina (incumbent)			
Democratic	Brian Cina (incumbent)			
Total	Brian Cina (incumbent)	2,124	52.12%	-0.74%
Progressive	Troy Headrick (incumbent)			
Democratic	Troy Headrick (incumbent)			
Total	Troy Headrick (incumbent)	1,898	46.58%	+0.95%
Write-in		53	1.30%	-0.21%
Total votes		4,075	100.00%	
	Blank	2,097		
