= Virginia V. Lyons =

American politician (born 1944)

Virginia Lyons
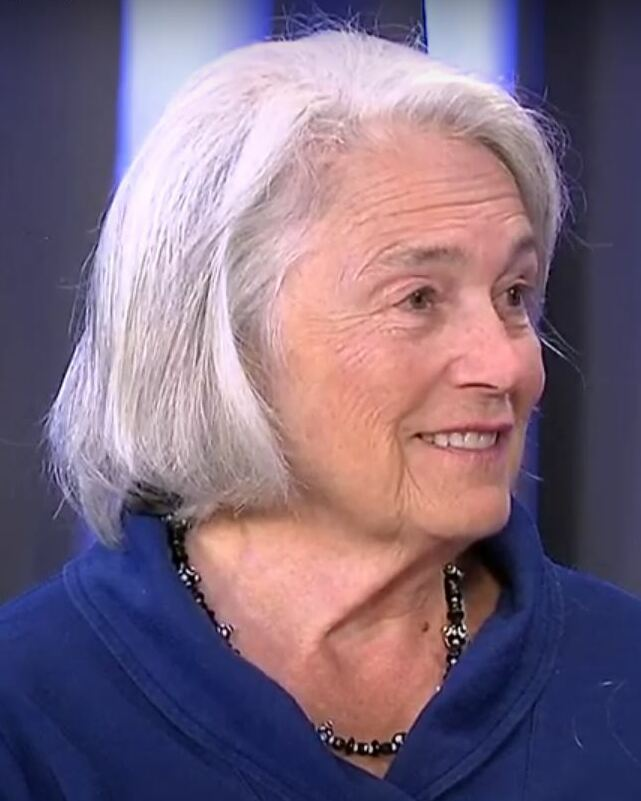
- Lyons in 2022

Member of the Vermont Senate
- Incumbent
- Assumed office January 6, 2001 Serving with Kesha Ram Hinsdale and Thomas Chittenden
- Constituency: Chittenden district (2001–2023); Chittenden-Southeast district (2023–Present)

Personal details
- Born: September 24, 1944 (age 81) Auburn, New York, U.S.
- Party: Democratic
- Spouse: Richard Lyons
- Children: 2

Virginia "Ginny" V. Lyons (born September 24, 1944) is an American politician serving as a Democratic member of the Vermont State Senate. She previously represented the Chittenden senate district, and has represented the Chittenden-Southeast Vermont Senate District since 2023.

She was first elected to the Vermont State Senate in 2000 and continues in that office.

== Biography ==
Lyons was born in Auburn, New York, on September 24, 1944. She received an A.B. degree in zoology from Drew University in 1966, an M.S. in nutritional biochemistry from Rutgers University in 1968, and a doctorate of policy and administration from the University of Vermont. She is married to Richard Lyons, MD, and has two daughters. Lyons moved to Williston, Vermont, in 1974 and continues to reside there. She is a part-time professor for the Vermont State Colleges.

== Public life ==
She has served as:

- Chair of the Williston select board.
- Justice of the Peace for Williston.
- Williston Fence Viewer.
- Chittenden County Regional Planning Commission, alternate member.
- Chittenden County Regional Planning Commission, plan update committee.
- Chittenden County Regional Planning Commission, legislative and economic development committee.
- State Senator, elected in 2000 and reelected in 2002, 2004, 2006, 2008, 2010, 2012, 2014, and 2016.

== See also ==
- Members of the Vermont Senate, 2005–2006 session
- Members of the Vermont Senate, 2007–2008 session
