= Michael Sirotkin =

American politician

Member of the Vermont Senate from the Chittenden district

Personal details
- Born: Michael D. Sirotkin; 1948 (age 77–78)
- Party: Democratic
- Spouse: Sally Fox (d.)
- Children: 2
- Education: Wharton School of the University of Pennsylvania, Sturm College of Law
- Profession: Attorney, lobbyist

Michael D. Sirotkin (born 1948) is an American politician and lawyer.

Originally from Queens, New York, Sirotkin went to the Wharton School of the University of Pennsylvania and the Sturm College of Law.

Sirotkin met Sally Fox while taking a class in preparation for the Colorado bar exam. They married on October 7, 1979. Sirotkin and Fox moved to Vermont when Sirotkin received a job offer there.

Sirotkin then practiced law in Vermont and lived in South Burlington, Vermont. He worked as a public policy attorney and lobbyist for the American Heart Association, Community of Vermont Elders, the Vermont State Labor Council AFL–CIO, the Vermont State Colleges Faculty Federation, the Buildings and Construction Trades Council, the Vermont Troopers Association, Patient Choices Vermont,

Sirotkin's wife, Sally Fox, was a State Senator. Fox died of a rare form of lung cancer on January 10, 2014. Before Fox died, she suggested Sirotkin seek appointment to her seat in the Senate. Following Fox's death, the Chittenden County Democratic Party voted to recommend that Governor Peter Shumlin appoint Sirotkin to the vacant seat in the Senate. Governor Shumlin appointed Sirotkin on January 27, 2014. After being appointed to the Senate, Sirotkin severed his financial ties with his lobbying firm of Sirotkin and Necrason. Sirotkin was sworn into office on February 10, 2014.

Sirotkin ran for election to a full-term in the Senate several months later. Fourteen candidates ran for the six seats to represent the Chitternden. Sirotkin came in sixth place, winning election for a full term in the Senate.

Sirotkin joined the board of directors of Hunger Free Vermont in 2016.

In 2016, Sirotkin ran for reelection. Sirotkin won reelection to a second full term.
