= Kumulia Long =

American politician

Member of the Vermont House of Representatives from the Chittenden-Franklin district
- Incumbent
- Assumed office April 1, 2026
- Preceded by: Chris Taylor

Personal details
- Party: Republican
- Children: 3

Kumulia "Kase" Long is an American politician who is as a member of the Vermont House of Representatives.

== Biography ==
Long works as a real estate broker. He served in the Vermont Army National Guard for 11 years, for which he was awarded the Vermont Distinguished Service Medal. He was also formerly Chair of the Milton School Board.

In 2020, Long ran as a candidate for the Vermont State Senate in the Chittenden district, where he received 18,763 votes (4.7%), but did not win.

Long was appointed to the Vermont House of Representatives on April 1, 2026 by governor of Vermont Phil Scott, to fill the vacancy left by the resignation of Chris Taylor.
