= Diana Gonzalez =

American politician and member of the Vermont State House of Representatives

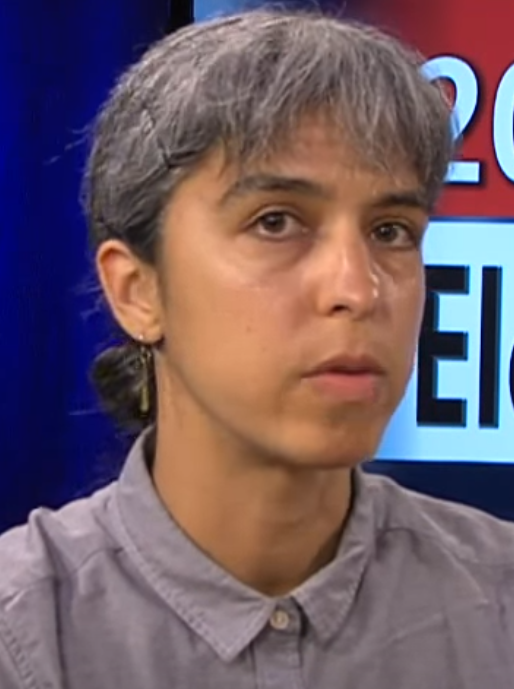

Member of the Vermont House of Representatives from the Chittenden 6-7 district
- In office 2014–2021
- Succeeded by: Taylor Small

Personal details
- Party: Progressive
- Education: Western Washington University (BA); School for International Training (MA); University of Vermont (EdD)

Diana Gonzalez is an American politician who served in the Vermont House of Representatives from 2014 to 2021.
