= Debbie Ingram =

American politician

Member of the Vermont Senate from the Chittenden district
- In office January 6, 2017 – January 6, 2021
- Preceded by: Helen Riehle; David Zuckerman
- Succeeded by: Thomas Chittenden; Kesha Ram Hinsdale

Personal details
- Born: 1962 (age 63–64) Savannah, Georgia
- Party: Democratic Party

Debbie Ingram (born 1962) is an American politician, who served in the Vermont Senate from 2017 to 2021. She lost her 2020 bid for Lieutenant Governor of Vermont.

== Background ==
Ingram was educated at Stanford University, with a degree in communication, and Fuller Theological Seminary, with a Master of Divinity. She also completed a fellowship at Cambridge University in England. She is an ordained United Church of Christ minister, and serves as executive director of Vermont Interfaith Action. Ingram is a graduate of Emerge Vermont and the Vermont Leadership Institute.

She is out as lesbian.

== 2020 campaign for lieutenant governor ==
Ingram's 2020 campaign website for Lieutenant Governor articulated the following goals: bringing people together, rebuilding the economy, advancing social justice, making housing affordable, lowering the cost of health care, and combating climate change.

In 2018, Ingram was endorsed by the Vermont State Employees Association, Vermont Conservation Voters, Vermont Sierra Club, Vermont chapter of the National Education Association, Vermont chapter of Planned Parenthood, and Vermont chapter of the National Association of Social Workers.

In 2020, the LGBTQ Victory Fund listed Ingram as a "game changer" because, if she had won her campaign for Lieutenant Governor, she would have been the first openly LGBTQ statewide elected official in Vermont. Ingram was also endorsed by the Vermont Racial Justice Alliance.

== Political career ==
A member of the Williston Selectboard, Ingram first ran for election to the state senate in 2012. She was not elected that year, but won election when she ran again in 2016.

Ingram serves as Vice Chair of the Senate Committee on Education, and as Clerk of the Senate Committee on Health and Welfare. She also serves on the Vermont Child Poverty Council.

In the Senate, Ingram's legislative priorities have included a comprehensive substance misuse program, expansion of child care, and increasing funding for mental health services. She has also championed greater inclusion of ethnic and social minorities in school curricula and Vermont's celebration of Indigenous Peoples' Day. Ingram has also introduced legislation to mandate more training on the appropriate use of force by law enforcement.

In 2017, she was charged with driving under the influence after crashing her car. She pled guilty, acknowledging that she has the disease of alcoholism. She has been back in recovery ever since.

She was reelected to another senate term in 2018.

Ingram also served for six years on the Williston Planning Commission and six years on the Williston Selectboard.
