= Spectrum Youth and Family Services =

Nonprofit organization in Vermont, U.S.

Coordinates: 44.481397°N 73.213856°W

- Founded: 1970
- Type: Nonprofit organization
- Headquarters: Burlington, Vermont
- Region served: Chittenden, Franklin, and Grand Isle counties, Vermont
- Key people: Mark Redmond (Executive Director)
- Website: www.spectrumvt.org

Spectrum Youth and Family Services is a nonprofit organization based in Burlington, Vermont, that provides housing, counseling, prevention, employment, and support services for youth and young adults. Founded in 1970, the organization serves young people experiencing homelessness, involvement with the child welfare or juvenile justice systems, substance use challenges, and other barriers to stability. Spectrum operates programs in Burlington and St. Albans and serves youth throughout northwestern Vermont.

== History ==
In 1970, the Burlington Ecumenical Action Ministry, together with a group of community members, founded SHAC (Shelter Action) to address the growing number of runaway and homeless youth in Vermont. The organization later became known as Spectrum Youth and Family Services. Patrick Leahy, then serving as Chittenden County State's Attorney, was among its early board members.

In 2012, the Vermont Department for Children and Families asked Spectrum to expand beyond Chittenden County into Franklin and Grand Isle counties to serve youth aging out of foster care.

In 2014, Spectrum partnered with researchers at Dartmouth College's Geisel School of Medicine on a five-year National Institutes of Health-funded study examining treatment approaches for adolescents and young adults with substance-use disorders.

In March 2021, Spectrum opened a drop-in center in St. Albans, its first permanent facility in Franklin County.

In 2025, Spectrum opened an eight-bed shelter for homeless youth and young adults in St. Albans in partnership with Champlain Housing Trust and state housing agencies.

== Programs and services ==
Spectrum provides prevention, intervention, housing, counseling, and life-skills services for youth and young adults ages 12–30. Services include emergency and transitional housing, drop-in centers, outpatient counseling, employment coaching, mentoring, and support for youth experiencing homelessness, involvement with the justice system, or family instability.

The organization organizes its work around three areas: Prevention and Intervention, Life Skills, and Basic Needs. Spectrum operates facilities in Burlington and St. Albans and partners with Community Health Centers of Burlington to provide health and behavioral health services for youth and young adults.

== Youth homelessness initiatives ==
Spectrum is one of Vermont's primary providers of services for runaway, homeless, and housing-insecure youth in Vermont. In 2023, the organization launched a guaranteed-income pilot program providing monthly stipends to young adults at risk of homelessness. The initiative was designed to evaluate whether direct financial assistance could improve housing stability and economic outcomes among participants.

== Recognition ==
In 2009, the National Network for Youth named Spectrum its Agency of the Year.

In 2010, Spectrum's Riverstone Counseling Program received an Innovation Award in Substance Abuse Services from the State Associations of Addiction Services and NIATx for reducing wait times for outpatient treatment referrals.

In 2012, a three-year evaluation of Spectrum's Rapid Referral Program found substantially lower rates of criminal recidivism among participating youth compared with a control group. The program was later highlighted by The New York Times Opinionator blog as an example of social innovation.

Since 2022, Spectrum has been recognized as one of Vermont's Best Places to Work by Vermont Business Magazine and the Vermont Chamber of Commerce.
