= Christopher Pearson (Vermont politician) =

American politician (born 1973)

Member of the Vermont Senate from the Chittenden district
- In office January 6, 2017 – January 4, 2023
- Preceded by: Helen Riehle; David Zuckerman
- Succeeded by: Martine Gulick; Tanya Vyhovsky

Progressive Minority Leader of the Vermont House of Representatives
- In office January 2011 – January 4, 2017
- Succeeded by: Robin Chesnut-Tangerman
- In office January 2007 – January 2009

Member of the Vermont House of Representatives
- In office January 2011 – January 2017
- Preceded by: Multi-member district
- Succeeded by: Brian Cina; Selene Colburn
- Constituency: Chittenden-3-4 (2011-2013); Chittenden-6-4 (2013-2017)
- In office April 2006 – January 2009
- Preceded by: Multi-member district
- Succeeded by: Multi-member district
- Constituency: Chittenden-3-4

Personal details
- Born: Christopher A. Pearson Alberta, Canada
- Party: Progressive
- Spouse: Lacey Richards
- Profession: Political & Communications Consultant

Christopher A. Pearson (born January 5, 1973) is an American politician and member of the Vermont Progressive Party. He spent three terms in the Vermont Senate as one of 6 senators representing Chittenden County. He previously spent five terms in the Vermont House of Representatives representing the Chittenden-3-4 District (currently, the Chittenden 6-4 District) during 2006-2009 and 2011–2017.

Pearson served as Leader of the Progressive Party caucus in the Vermont House from 2007 to 2009 and 2011–2017.

After Chittenden County Progressive Senator David Zuckerman ran for Lieutenant Governor of Vermont, Pearson decided to run for Vermont Senate from Chittenden County as a fusion candidate supported by Vermont Democratic Party and Vermont Progressive Party. On May 24, 2016, Pearson was endorsed by presidential candidate U.S. Senator Bernie Sanders. On November 8, 2016, Pearson finished sixth in an 8-candidate race for the six State Senate seats from Chittenden County. He was re-elected in 2018 and 2020 before deciding not to run in 2022. He currently serves as Secretary for the Board of National Popular Vote, an advocacy organization for the National Popular Vote Interstate Compact.
