= Thomas Chittenden (Vermont state senator) =

American politician from Vermont

Thomas Ira Chittenden
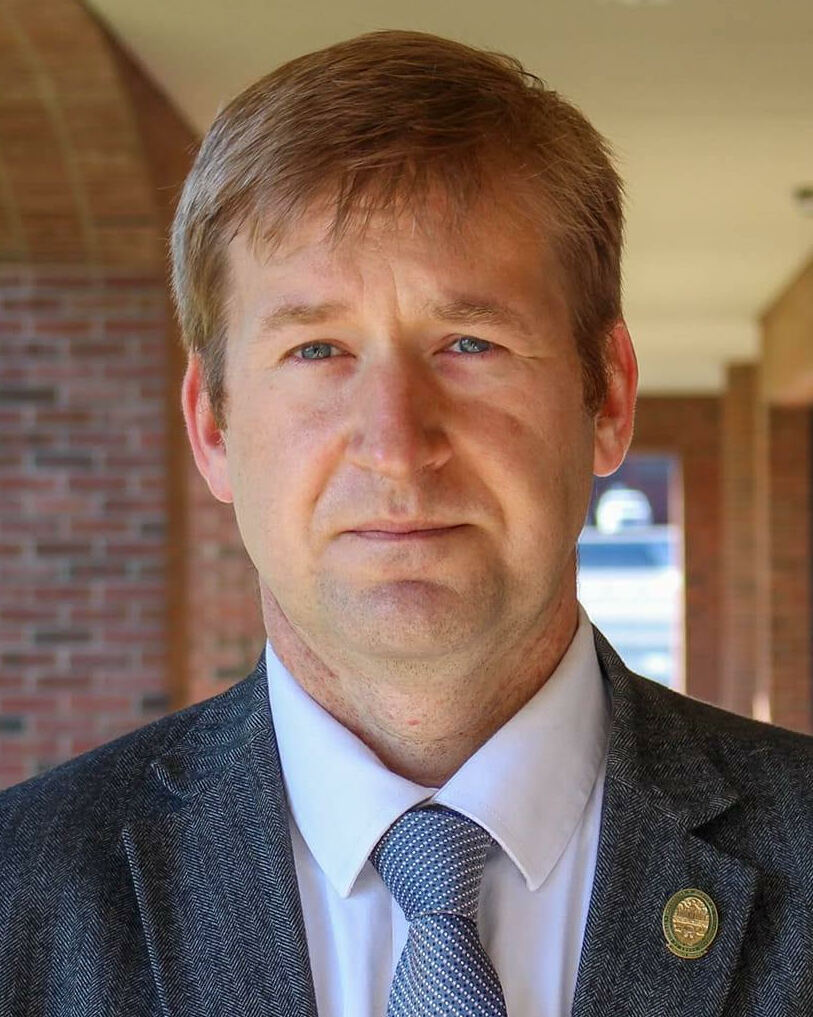
- Chittenden in 2021

Member of the Vermont Senate
- Incumbent
- Assumed office January 6, 2021 Serving with Kesha Ram Hinsdale and Ginny Lyons
- Preceded by: Tim Ashe; Debbie Ingram
- Constituency: Chittenden (2021–2023); Chittenden-Southeast Vermont Senate District (2023–Present)

Personal details
- Born: October 8, 1977 (age 48) South Burlington, Vermont, U.S.
- Party: Democratic
- Spouse: Kimberly Chittenden
- Children: 3
- Website: Official website

Thomas Ira Chittenden (born October 8, 1977) is an American politician from Vermont and a member of the Vermont Democratic Party. He was elected as a Vermont State Senator on November 3, 2020 as one of the six senators representing Chittenden County. He is a South Burlington City Councilor (2015 to present) serving in his third term. He has also been twice elected by the faculty of the University of Vermont to serve as their Faculty Senate President (2019–2020). He also served as the Chair and Vice Chair of Green Mountain Transit Authority (2015–2020).

His Vermont family lineage traces nine generations back to Bethuel Chittenden, the brother of Vermont's first governor Thomas Chittenden and he lives in the Chittenden family home in South Burlington with Chittenden land deeds tracing to 1836.

He was the 2019 UVM Grossman School of Business Faculty Member of the Year and in 2017 was awarded the UVM Presidents Distinguished Lecturer Award. He is the father of three children attending public school and married to Kimberly Chittenden who teaches in the Colchester School District.
