= Kesha Ram Hinsdale =

American politician from Vermont

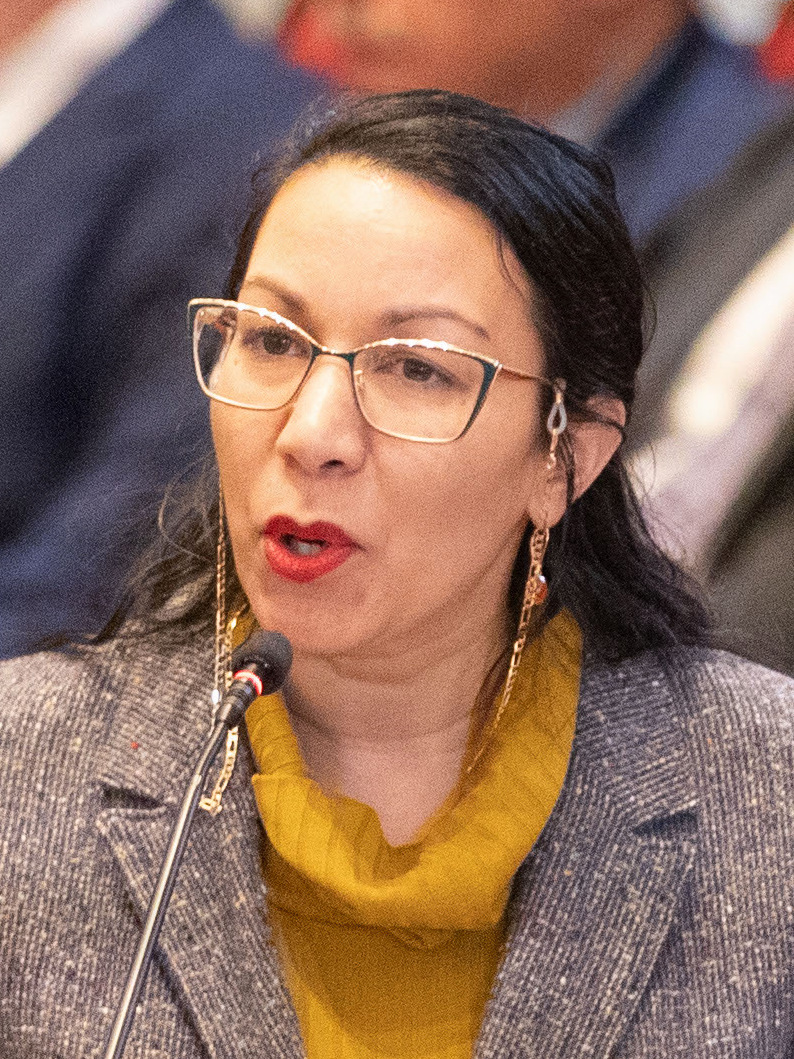
- Ram Hinsdale speaking in 2026

Majority Leader of the Vermont Senate
- Incumbent
- Assumed office January 8, 2025
- Preceded by: Alison Clarkson

Member of the Vermont Senate
- Incumbent
- Assumed office January 6, 2021 Serving with Thomas Chittenden and Ginny Lyons
- Preceded by: Tim Ashe; Debbie Ingram
- Constituency: Chittenden (2021–2023); Chittenden Southeast (2023–present)

Member of the Vermont House of Representatives
- In office January 7, 2009 – May 11, 2016
- Preceded by: Multi-member district
- Succeeded by: Brian Cina; Selene Colburn
- Constituency: Chittenden 3-4 (2009–2013); Chittenden 6-4 (2013–2016)

Personal details
- Born: August 2, 1986 (age 40) Santa Monica, California, U.S.
- Party: Democratic
- Spouse: Jacob Hinsdale (m. 2021)
- Relatives: Shreela Flather (aunt); Ganga Ram (great-great-grandfather)
- Education: University of Vermont (BA, BS); Harvard University (MPA)
- Website: Campaign website

Kesha Ram Hinsdale (born August 2, 1986) is an American activist and politician who is the majority leader of the Vermont Senate. She served in the Vermont House of Representatives from 2009 to 2016, representing the Chittenden 6-4 District (numbered Chittenden 3–4 before 2012), which encompasses the Hill Section of Burlington and the University of Vermont. In her early career, Ram was the youngest member of the House of Representatives and the youngest state legislator in the country. She is the youngest Indian American to ever serve in state elected office.

In 2016, Ram finished third in the Democratic primary for lieutenant governor of Vermont. In 2020, Ram finished second in the Democratic primary race for the six at-large State Senate seats from Chittenden County. In the November general election, she was one of five Democrats elected to the State Senate, along with one Progressive. She is a great-great-granddaughter of Sir Ganga Ram.

== Early life and education ==
Born to a Jewish mother and Hindu father, Ram grew up in Los Angeles, California, where her parents ran an Irish pub. Sir Ganga Ram, her great-great-grandfather, was a supervising engineer and philanthropist in British India and her aunt, Shreela Flather, was a life peer in the British House of Lords. She graduated from Santa Monica High School in 2004. After graduating, she moved from California to Vermont to attend the University of Vermont, where she graduated magna cum laude in 2008 with a Bachelor of Science in natural resource planning and a Bachelor of Arts in political science. She was awarded a Truman Scholarship. While at the University of Vermont she served as student body president. Her first elected position was as Student Council President in fifth grade. Ram earned a Master of Public Administration from the Harvard Kennedy School in 2018.

== Career ==
She has served as the legal director for Women Helping Battered Women (now known as Steps to End Domestic Violence). Much of her work has centered on advocacy for people of color and immigrants in Vermont. She served as the public engagement specialist for the Burlington Community and Economic Development Office (CEDO) and interim director for Organizational Development at the Center for Whole Communities. She is a board member of the Center for Whole Communities, Emerge Vermont, Planned Parenthood of Northern New England, and the Vermont Natural Resources Council.

=== Vermont Legislature ===
Elected to the state House of Representatives at age 22 to represent the University District and Hill Section of Burlington, she represented the district from 2009 to 2016. She served as Clerk of the House General, Housing, and Affairs Committee from 2009 to 2011. She served as a member of the House Ways and Means Committee from 2011 to 2015. She served as the Vice Chair of the House Natural Resources Committee from 2015 to 2016. She led efforts to establish Vermont Abenaki tribal recognition, which she later personally apologized for to the Odanak First Nation. She also led efforts to create driver's privilege cards available to undocumented immigrants, to criminalize revenge porn and stalking, to establish energy siting standards, and to expand first-time homeownership tax credits.

On October 11, 2015, Ram announced her candidacy for lieutenant governor of Vermont. The incumbent, Republican Phil Scott, had earlier announced that he would run for governor. On October 26, 2015, Ram held a campaign kickoff in Burlington that was attended by many House colleagues and former governor Madeleine Kunin. She was endorsed by U.S. Representatives Ami Bera and Annie McLane Kuster, as well as Democracy for America. She came in third in the primary, behind House Speaker Shap Smith and the winner, Senator David Zuckerman.

In 2020, Ram ran for the Vermont Senate. In the primary, she finished second in the contest for the six at-large seats from Chittenden County. In the November general election, she finished third, and was one of five Democrats elected to the State Senate, along with one Progressive.

In 2022, Ram won reelection to the Vermont Senate. In 2024 she was elected Vermont Senate majority leader.

=== 2022 U.S. House of Representatives campaign ===
In January 2022, Ram Hinsdale announced her intention to run for the Democratic nomination in the 2022 United States House of Representatives election in Vermont, competing for the seat vacated by Peter Welch. However, in May 2022, she withdrew from the race and instead endorsed Becca Balint, the president pro tempore of the Vermont Senate.

== Personal life ==
In August 2021, Kesha Ram married Jacob Hinsdale, the member of a prominent Vermont property management and real estate development family, where he serves as one of the firm's executives.

Vermont Senate
Preceded by Alison H. Clarkson	Majority Leader of the Vermont Senate; 2025–present	Incumbent
