= Vermont Commission on Women =

American state government agency

The Vermont Commission on Women (VCW) is a non-partisan Vermont government agency advancing rights and opportunities for women and girls. Sixteen volunteer commissioners, along with representatives from organizations concerned with women's issues, guide VCW's public education, coalition building, and advocacy efforts.

VCW is a state agency working to help women achieve legal, economic, social, and political equality in Vermont. Founded in 1964, the commission serves as an adviser, planner, and information source for the legislature on issues affecting women. The commission also functions as an educational resource for the public by conducting research, producing publications on the legal rights of Vermont women, and providing conferences and workshops.

== Background ==
In 1962, President Kennedy challenged every state to create a “Governor’s Commission on the Status of Women.” These commissions would be charged with two tasks: “To encourage women to use their abilities, and to reduce discrimination against women.” In response, on November 23, 1964, Vermont Governor Philip Hoff established the Governor's Commission on the Status of Women by executive order. The order directed the commission to conduct research about “how discrimination was occurring, how women’s roles were changing, documenting the needs of working women and their children, and supporting a more active role of women in the political life of the state.” It is now one of the oldest commissions in continuous operation in the United States, having celebrated its 50th anniversary in 2014.

VCW:

- conducts research and study of issues affecting the status of women in Vermont;
- advises and consults with the executive and legislative branches of State government on policies affecting the status of women in Vermont;
- educates and informs business, education, State and local governments, and the general public about the nature and scope of sex discrimination and other matters affecting the status of women in Vermont;
- serves as a liaison and clearinghouse between government, private interest groups, and the general public concerned with services for women.

== Advocacy ==
The VCW researches and monitors legislation and policies that are important to women and families in Vermont. VCW also assists various policymakers with research on pertinent policy issues. VCW organizes and partners with broad-based coalitions on issues affecting Vermont families.

=== Change the Story campaign ===
The Vermont Commission on Women, in coalition with Vermont Works for Women and the Vermont Women's Fund, launched the statewide campaign "Change the Story Vermont" to advance women's economic progress. Change the Story is an initiative to align policy, program, and philanthropy to significantly improve women's economic status in Vermont. The initiative has released four status reports Women, Work and Wages in VT, Where VT Women Work...and Why It Matters, Women's Business Ownership and the Vermont Economy, and Vermont Women and Leadership. These reports tell the story of women's economic status in Vermont and are being used to inform policy and campaign goals. Changethestoryvt

=== Sexual harassment ===
The VCW has long advocated for better legislation around sexual harassment, as well as better broadcast and recognition of the current laws in Vermont. According to Vermont law, a sexual harassment policy is required of all workplaces and school, and these policies are supposed to be in a visible, accessible place. The VCW has been instrumental in publicizing these policies, and publishes literature on citizen's rights in instances of sexual harassment, the action they can take, and places to find support.

=== Expressing breastmilk in the workplace ===
The VCW has advocated for women's rights to pump milk in public places, and has recently been a strong influence in passing legislation that allows women to have time and a place to pump while at work. When compared to the national average, a higher percentage of Vermont women breastfeed; but some women were forced to stop pumping because of their inability to pump at work. The passage of this law required employers to designate a space, and allow time for women to pump.

== Public education ==
One of the primary objectives of the commission is to serve as an educational resource for the public by conducting research, producing publications, and coordinating conferences and workshops utilizing the most current data for people across Vermont. The commission has published several guides informing Vermonters of their rights on key issues.

== Governance ==
Established in 1964 as the Governor's Commission on the Status of Women, they are one of many state and municipal women's commissions in the United States. In 2002 they were put into Vermont statute and renamed the Vermont Commission on Women. The VCW has a staff of three, but is governed by 16 Commissioners who work in conjunction with an Advisory Council of Vermont organizations to serve the interests of women and girls in Vermont.

=== Commissioners ===
Commissioners are appointed volunteers who have experience actively working to reduce discrimination and improve the status of women. The VCW statute indicates that “members of the commission shall be drawn from throughout the state and from diverse racial, ethnic, religious, age, sexual orientation, and socioeconomic backgrounds, and shall have had experience working toward the improvement of the status of women in society.” Commissioners bring multiple perspectives to decision-making: as women with family responsibilities, as workers, as employers, and business owners. Eight Commissioner appointments are made by the Governor, three by the Speaker of the Vermont House of Representatives, three by the Vermont Senate Committee on Committees, and one by the Democratic and Republican parties each. Commissioners serve four year terms. The commission is a deliberative body, and decisions are adopted by majority vote.

=== Advisory Council ===
The Advisory Council is made up of 27 members whose interests align with the commission's mission to reduce discrimination and improve women's status in Vermont. VCW's Advisory Council members are representatives of 24 organizations whose interests align with the commission's mission, the two Vermont Senators (Bernie Sanders and Patrick Leahy) and the Vermont Congressional Representative (Peter Welch). Members provide counsel to the commission on setting goals, strategies and objectives, by sharing the opinions and perspectives of the organizations they represent.
