= 2018 Vermont House of Representatives election =

- November 6, 2018

All 150 seats in the Vermont House of Representatives 76 seats needed for a majority
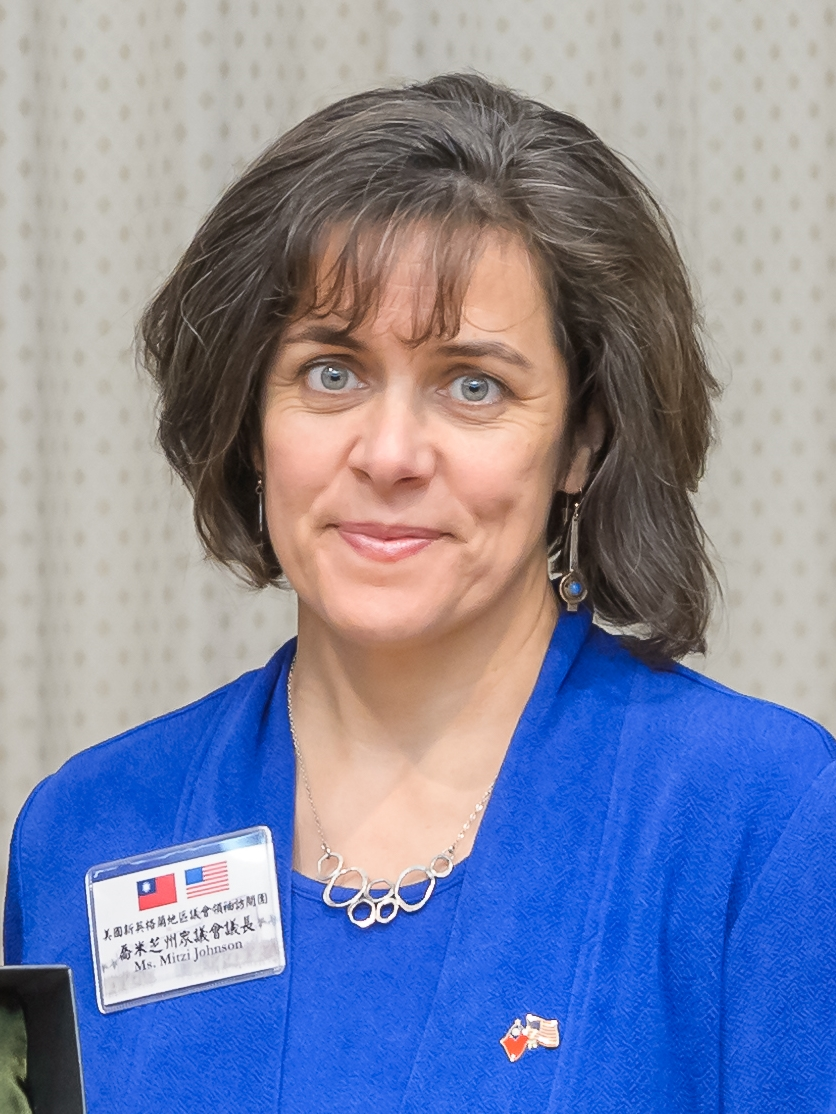

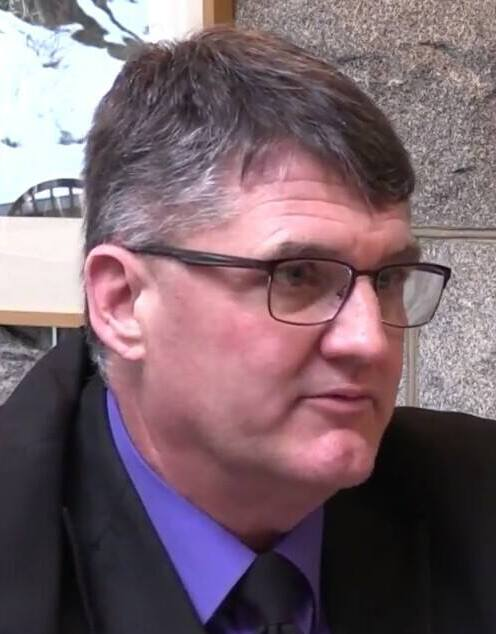
	Majority party	Minority party
Leader	Mitzi Johnson	Donald Turner, Jr. (retired)
Party	Democratic	Republican
Leader's seat	Grand Isle-Chittenden	Chittenden-10
Seats before	83	53
Seats won	95	43
Seat change	▲12	▼10
Popular vote	209,630	106,709
Percentage	58.52%	29.79%
Swing	▲7.94%	▼8.37%
	Third party	Fourth party
Leader	Robin Chesnut-Tangerman
Party	Progressive	Independent
Leader's seat	Rutland-Bennigton
Seats before	7	7
Seats won	7	5
Seat change	Steady	▼2
Popular vote	21,420	20,438
Percentage	5.98%	5.71%
Swing	▲0.27%	▲0.44%
- Results: Republican hold Republican gain Democratic hold Democratic gain Progressive hold Independent hold
Speaker before election
Mitzi Johnson
Democratic
Elected Speaker
Mitzi Johnson
Democratic

The 2018 Vermont House of Representatives elections took place as part of the biennial United States elections. Vermont voters elected state representatives in all 150 seats. State representatives serve two-year terms in the Vermont House of Representatives. A primary election on August 14, 2018, determined which candidates appeared on the November 6 general election ballot.

Following the 2016 State House elections, Democrats maintained effective control of the House with a 97 member caucus (83 Democrats, seven Independents, and seven Progressives). Before the election, to take control of the chamber from Democrats, the Republicans would have needed to net 23 State House seats. However, instead the Democrats instead gained 12 seats, increasing their majorities.

== Summary of results by State House district ==
Primary election results can be obtained from the Vermont Secretary of State's website.

State House district	Incumbent	Party	Elected representative	Party
Addison-1	Robin Scheu	Dem	Robin Scheu	Dem
Addison-1	Amy Sheldon	Dem	Amy Sheldon	Dem
Addison-2	Peter Conlon	Dem	Peter Conlon	Dem
Addison-3	Diane Lanpher	Dem	Diane Lanpher	Dem
Addison-3	Warren Van Wyck	Rep	Matt Birong	Dem
Addison-4	Fred Baser	Rep	Mari Cordes	Dem
Addison-4	David Sharpe	Dem	Caleb Elder	Dem
Addison-5	Harvey Smith	Rep	Harvey Smith	Rep
Addison-Rutland	Terry Norris	Ind	Terry Norris	Ind
Bennington-1	Bill Botzow	Dem	Nelson Brownell	Dem
Bennington-2-1	Timothy Corcoran	Dem	Timothy Corcoran	Dem
Bennington-2-1	Rachael Fields	Dem	Chris Bates	Dem
Bennington-2-2	Kiah Morris	Dem	Jim Carroll	Dem
Bennington-2-2	Mary Morrissey	Rep	Mary Morrissey	Rep
Bennington-3	Alice Miller	Dem	David Durfee	Dem
Bennington-4	Cynthia Browning	Dem	Cynthia Browning	Dem
Bennington-4	Brian Keefe	Rep	Kathleen James	Dem
Bennington-Rutland	Linda Joy Sullivan	Dem	Linda Joy Sullivan	Dem
Caledonia-1	Marcia Martel	Rep	Marcia Martel	Rep
Caledonia-2	Chip Troiano	Dem	Chip Troiano	Dem
Caledonia-3	Scott Beck	Rep	Scott Beck	Rep
Caledonia-3	Janssen Willhoit	Rep	Scott Campbell	Dem
Caledonia-4	Martha Feltus	Rep	Martha Feltus	Rep
Caledonia-4	Richard Lawrence	Rep	Patrick Seymour	Rep
Caledonia-Washington	Catherine Toll	Dem	Catherine Toll	Dem
Chittenden-1	Marcia Gardner	Dem	Marcia Gardner	Dem
Chittenden-2	Terence Macaig	Dem	Terence Macaig	Dem
Chittenden-2	Jim McCullough	Dem	Jim McCullough	Dem
Chittenden-3	Trevor Squirrell	Dem	Trevor Squirrell	Dem
Chittenden-3	George Till	Dem	George Till	Dem
Chittenden-4-1	Mike Yantachka	Dem	Mike Yantachka	Dem
Chittenden-4-2	Bill Lippert	Dem	Bill Lippert	Dem
Chittenden-5-1	Kate Webb	Dem	Kate Webb	Dem
Chittenden-5-2	Jessica Brumsted	Dem	Jessica Brumsted	Dem
Chittenden-6-1	Carol Ode	Dem	Carol Ode	Dem
Chittenden-6-1	Kurt Wright	Rep	Robert Hooper	Dem
Chittenden-6-2	Jean O'Sullivan	Dem	Jean O'Sullivan	Dem
Chittenden-6-3	Jill Krowinski	Dem	Jill Krowinski	Dem
Chittenden-6-3	Curtis McCormack	Dem	Curtis McCormack	Dem
Chittenden-6-4	Brian Cina	Prog	Brian Cina	Prog
Chittenden-6-4	Selene Colburn	Prog	Selene Colburn	Prog
Chittenden-6-5	Johannah Donovan	Dem	Johannah Donovan	Dem
Chittenden-6-5	Mary Sullivan	Dem	Mary Sullivan	Dem
Chittenden-6-6	Barbara Rachelson	Dem	Barbara Rachelson	Dem
Chittenden-6-7	Clem Bissonnette	Dem	Clem Bissonnette	Dem
Chittenden-6-7	Diana Gonzalez	Prog	Diana Gonzalez	Prog
Chittenden-7-1	Martin LaLonde	Dem	Martin LaLonde	Dem
Chittenden-7-2	Ann Pugh	Dem	Ann Pugh	Dem
Chittenden-7-3	Helen Head	Dem	John Killacky	Dem
Chittenden-7-4	Maida Townsend	Dem	Maida Townsend	Dem
Chittenden-8-1	Betsy Dunn	Dem	Marybeth Redmond	Dem
Chittenden-8-1	Linda Myers	Rep	Linda Myers	Rep
Chittenden-8-2	Dylan Giambatista	Dem	Dylan Giambatista	Dem
Chittenden-8-2	Lori Houghton	Dem	Lori Houghton	Dem
Chittenden-8-3	Robert Bancroft	Rep	Robert Bancroft	Rep
Chittenden-9-1	Jim Condon	Dem	Seth Chase	Dem
Chittenden-9-1	Curt Taylor	Dem	Curt Taylor	Dem
Chittenden-9-2	Patrick Brennan	Rep	Patrick Brennan	Rep
Chittenden-9-2	Maureen Dakin	Dem	Sarita Austin	Dem
Chittenden-10	Chris Mattos	Rep	Chris Mattos	Rep
Chittenden-10	Donald Turner Jr.	Rep	John Palasik	Rep
Essex-Caledonia	Constance Quimby	Rep	Constance Quimby	Rep
Essex-Caledonia-Orleans	Paul Lefebvre	Rep	Paul Lefebvre	Rep
Franklin-1	Carl Rosenquist	Rep	Carl Rosenquist	Rep
Franklin-2	Barbara Murphy	Ind	Barbara Murphy	Ind
Franklin-3-1	Kathleen Keenan	Dem	Mike McCarthy	Dem
Franklin-3-1	Corey Parent	Rep	Casey Toof	Rep
Franklin-3-2	Eileen Dickinson	Rep	Eileen Dickinson	Rep
Franklin-4	Marianna Gamache	Rep	Marianna Gamache	Rep
Franklin-4	Brian K. Savage	Rep	Brian K. Savage	Rep
Franklin-5	Stephen Beyor	Rep	Joshua Aldrich	Rep
Franklin-5	Albert Pearce	Rep	Charen Fegard	Dem
Franklin-6	Daniel Connor	Dem	James Gregoire	Rep
Franklin-7	Cindy Weed	Prog	Felisha Leffler	Rep
Grand Isle-Chittenden	Mitzi Johnson	Dem	Mitzi Johnson	Dem
Grand Isle-Chittenden	Ben Joseph	Dem	Leland Morgan	Rep
Lamoille-1	Heidi Scheuermann	Rep	Heidi Scheuermann	Rep
Lamoille-2	Matthew Hill	Dem	Matthew Hill	Dem
Lamoille-2	Daniel Noyes	Dem	Daniel Noyes	Dem
Lamoille-3	Bernard Juskiewicz	Rep	Lucy Rogers	Dem
Lamoille-Washington	Gary Nolan	Rep	Avram Patt	Dem
Lamoille-Washington	David Yacovone	Dem	David Yacovone	Dem
Orange-1	Robert Frenier	Rep	Carl Demrow	Dem
Orange-1	Rodney Graham	Rep	Rodney Graham	Rep
Orange-2	Sarah Copeland-Hanzas	Dem	Sarah Copeland-Hanzas	Dem
Orange-Caledonia	Chip Conquest	Dem	Chip Conquest	Dem
Orange-Washington-Addison	Jay Hooper	Dem	Jay Hooper	Dem
Orange-Washington-Addison	Ben Jickling	Ind	Ben Jickling	Ind
Orleans-1	Lynn Batchelor	Rep	Lynn Batchelor	Rep
Orleans-1	Brian Smith	Rep	Brian Smith	Rep
Orleans-2	Michael Marcotte	Rep	Michael Marcotte	Rep
Orleans-2	Gary Viens	Rep	Woodman Page	Rep
Orleans-Caledonia	Vicki Strong	Rep	Vicki Strong	Rep
Orleans-Caledonia	Sam Young	Dem	Sam Young	Dem
Orleans-Lamoille	Mark Higley	Rep	Mark Higley	Rep
Rutland-1	Patricia McCoy	Rep	Patricia McCoy	Rep
Rutland-2	Thomas Burditt	Rep	Thomas Burditt	Rep
Rutland-2	Dave Potter	Dem	Dave Potter	Dem
Rutland-3	William Canfield	Rep	William Canfield	Rep
Rutland-3	Robert Helm	Rep	Robert Helm	Rep
Rutland-4	Thomas Terenzini	Rep	Thomas Terenzini	Rep
Rutland-5-1	Peter Fagan	Rep	Peter Fagan	Rep
Rutland-5-2	Lawrence Cupoli	Rep	Lawrence Cupoli	Rep
Rutland-5-3	Mary Howard	Dem	Mary Howard	Dem
Rutland-5-4	Douglas Gage	Rep	William Notte	Dem
Rutland-6	Stephen Carr	Dem	Stephanie Jerome	Dem
Rutland-6	Butch Shaw	Rep	Butch Shaw	Rep
Rutland-Bennington	Robin Chestnut-Tangerman	Prog	Robin Chestnut-Tangerman	Prog
Rutland-Windsor-1	Jim Harrison	Rep	Jim Harrison	Rep
Rutland-Windsor-2	Dennis Devereux	Rep	Logan Nicoll	Dem
Washington-1	Anne Donahue	Rep	Anne Donahue	Rep
Washington-1	Patti Lewis	Rep	Kenneth Goslant	Rep
Washington-2	Robert LaClair	Rep	Robert LaClair	Rep
Washington-2	Francis McFaun	Rep	Francis McFaun	Rep
Washington-3	Paul Poirier	Ind	Peter Anthony	Dem
Washington-3	Tommy Walz	Dem	Tommy Walz	Dem
Washington-4	Mary Hooper	Dem	Mary Hooper	Dem
Washington-4	Warren Kitzmiller	Dem	Warren Kitzmiller	Dem
Washington-5	Kimberly Jessup	Dem	Kimberly Jessup	Dem
Washington-6	Janet Ancel	Dem	Janet Ancel	Dem
Washington-7	Maxine Grad	Dem	Maxine Grad	Dem
Washington-7	Edward Read	Ind	Kari Dolan	Dem
Washington-Chittenden	Tom Stevens	Dem	Tom Stevens	Dem
Washington-Chittenden	Theresa Wood	Dem	Theresa Wood	Dem
Windham-1	Michael Hebert	Rep	Sara Coffey	Dem
Windham-2-1	Valerie Stuart	Dem	Emilie Kornheiser	Dem
Windham-2-2	Mollie Burke	Prog	Mollie Burke	Prog
Windham-2-3	Tristan Toleno	Dem	Tristan Toleno	Dem
Windham-3	Carolyn Partridge	Dem	Carolyn Partridge	Dem
Windham-3	Matt Trieber	Dem	Matt Trieber	Dem
Windham-4	David Deen	Dem	Nader Hashim	Dem
Windham-4	Mike Mrowicki	Dem	Mike Mrowicki	Dem
Windham-5	Emily Long	Dem	Emily Long	Dem
Windham-6	John Gannon	Dem	John Gannon	Dem
Windham-Bennington	Laura Sibilia	Ind	Laura Sibilia	Ind
Windham-Bennington-Windsor	Kelly Pajala	Ind	Kelly Pajala	Ind
Windsor-1	John Bartholomew	Dem	John Bartholomew	Dem
Windsor-1	Paul Belaski	Dem	Zachariah Ralph	Prog
Windsor-2	Annmarie Christensen	Dem	Annmarie Christensen	Dem
Windsor-3-1	Thomas Bock	Dem	Thomas Bock	Dem
Windsor-3-2	Alice Emmons	Dem	Alice Emmons	Dem
Windsor-3-2	Robert Forguites	Dem	Robert Forguites	Dem
Windsor-4-1	Susan Buckholz	Dem	Randall Szott	Dem
Windsor-4-2	Kevin Christie	Dem	Kevin Christie	Dem
Windsor-4-2	Gabrielle Lucke	Dem	Rebecca White	Dem
Windsor-5	Charles Kimbell	Dem	Charles Kimbell	Dem
Windsor-Orange-1	David Ainsworth	Rep	John O'Brien	Dem
Windsor-Orange-2	Timothy Briglin	Dem	Timothy Briglin	Dem
Windsor-Orange-2	James Masland	Dem	James Masland	Dem
Windsor-Rutland	Sandy Haas	Prog	Sandy Haas	Prog

== Incumbents not seeking re-election ==
=== Retiring incumbents ===
28 incumbent representatives (17 Democrats and 11 Republicans) did not seek re-election in 2018:

- David Sharpe (D), Addison-4
- Bill Botzow (D), Bennington-1
- Rachael Fields (D), Bennington-2-1
- Kiah Morris (D), Bennington-2-2
- Alice Miller (D), Bennington-3
- Janssen Willhoit (R), Caledonia-3 (running for attorney general)
- Richard Lawrence (R), Caledonia-4
- Helen Head (D), Chittenden-7-3
- Betsy Dunn (D), Chittenden-8-1
- Jim Condon (D), Chittenden-9-1
- Maureen Dakin (D), Chittenden-9-2
- Donald H. Turner (R), Chittenden-10 (running for lieutenant governor)
- Kathleen Keenan (D), Franklin-3-1
- Corey Parent (R), Franklin-3-1
- Stephen Beyor (R), Franklin-5
- Albert Pearce (R), Franklin-5
- Daniel Connor (D), Franklin-6
- Bernie Juskiewicz (R), Lamoille-3
- Robert Frenier (R), Orange-1
- Gary Viens (R), Orleans-2
- Douglas Gage (R), Rutland-5-4
- Stephen Carr (D), Rutland-6
- Dennis Devereux (R), Rutland-Windsor-2
- Patti Lewis (R), Washington-1
- Michael Hebert (R), Windham-1
- David Deen (D), Windham-4
- Susan Buckholz (D), Windsor-4-1
- Gabrielle Lucke (D), Windsor-4-2

=== Defeated in primary ===
- Valerie Stuart (D), Windham-2-1
- Paul Belaski (D), Windsor-1

== Predictions ==
Source	Ranking	As of
Governing	Safe D	October 8, 2018

== Detailed results by State House district ==
- Note: Primary election results are only shown for contested primaries. For information on non-contested primary elections, refer to the Vermont Secretary of State's website.

=== Addison-1 ===
- The Addison-1 district has 2 seats.

Vermont House district Addison-1 election, 2018
Party	Candidate	Votes	%
Democratic	Amy Sheldon (incumbent) (Note: Running as "Democratic/Progressive")	2,676	37.65
Democratic	Robin Scheu (incumbent)	2,592	36.47
Total votes		5,268	100.0
Democratic hold			
Democratic hold			

=== Addison-2 ===
- The Addison-2 district has 1 seat.

Vermont House district Addison-2 election, 2018
Party	Candidate	Votes	%
Democratic	Peter Conlon (incumbent)	1,740	81.19
Total votes			100.0
Democratic hold			

=== Addison-3 ===
- The Addison-3 district has 2 seats.

Vermont House district Addison-3 election, 2018
Party	Candidate	Votes	%
Democratic	Matt Birong	2,201	36.16
Democratic	Diane Lanpher (incumbent)	2,122	34.87
Republican	Warren Van Wyck (incumbent)	1,763	28.97
Total votes		6,086	100.0
Democratic hold			

=== Addison-4 ===
- The Addison-4 district has 2 seats.

Vermont House district Addison-4 Republican primary election, 2018
Party	Candidate	Votes	%
Republican	Fred Baser (incumbent)	318	36.72
Republican	Valerie Mullin	306	35.33
Write-in	Total Write-ins	7	0.81
N/A	Blank Votes	235	27.14
Total votes		866	100.0

Vermont House district Addison-4 Democratic primary election, 2018
Party	Candidate	Votes	%
Democratic	Mari Cordes	1,037	33.76
Democratic	Caleb Elder	865	28.16
Democratic	Paul Forlenza	516	16.80
Democratic	Rob Demic	297	967
Write-in	Total Write-ins	5	0.16
N/A	Blank Votes	352	11.46
Total votes		3,072	100.0

Vermont House district Addison-4 election, 2018
Party	Candidate	Votes	%
Democratic	Caleb Elder	2,278	25.73
Democratic	Mari Cordes	2,077	23.46
Republican	Fred Baser (incumbent)	2,018	22.79
Republican	Valerie Mullin	1,466	16.56
Total votes		7,839	100.0

=== Addison-5 ===
- The Addison-5 district has 1 seat.

Vermont House district Addison-5 election, 2018
Party	Candidate	Votes	%
Republican	Harvey Smith (incumbent)	1,505	71.73
Total votes			100.0
Republican hold			

=== Addison-Rutland ===
- The Addison-Rutland district has 1 seat.

Vermont House district Addison-Rutland election, 2018
Party	Candidate	Votes	%
Independent	Terry Norris (incumbent)	1,009	55.59
Democratic	Barbara Wilson	735	40.40
Total votes		1,744	100.0

=== Bennington-1 ===
- The Bennington-1 district has 1 seat.

Vermont House district Bennington-1 election, 2018
Party	Candidate	Votes	%
Democratic	Nelson Brownell	681	46.08
Republican	Jim O'Connor	394	26.66
Independent	Frederick Miller	364	24.63
Total votes		1,439	100.0

=== Bennington-2-1 ===
- The Bennington-2-1 district has 2 seats.

Vermont House district Bennington-2-1 election, 2018
Party	Candidate	Votes	%
Democratic	Timothy R. Corcoran II (incumbent)	1,733	33.31
Democratic	Chris Bates	1,328	25.53
Republican	Kevin Hoyt	703	13.51
Independent	Michael Stern	400	7.69
Total votes		4,164	100.0

=== Bennington-2-2 ===
- The Bennington-2-2 district has 2 seats.

Vermont House district Bennington-2-2 election, 2018
Party	Candidate	Votes	%
Republican	Mary A. Morrissey (incumbent)	1,810	35.83
Democratic	Jim Carroll (Note: Democratic incumbent Rep. Morris withdrew and endorsed her replacement nominee, Jim Carroll.)	1,559	30.86
Total votes		3,369	100.0
Democratic hold			
Republican hold			

=== Bennington-3 ===
- The Bennington-3 district has 1 seat.

Vermont House district Bennington-3 Democratic primary election, 2018
Party	Candidate	Votes	%
Democratic	David Durfee	442	66.37
Democratic	Tim Scoggins	221	33.18
Write-in	Total Write-ins	3	0.45
Total votes		666	100.0
N/A	Blank Votes	37	

Vermont House district Bennington-3 election, 2018
Party	Candidate	Votes	%
Democratic	David Durfee	1,394	97.55
Write-in	Tim Scoggins	4	0.28
Write-in	Alice Miller	3	0.21
Write-in	Write-ins (other)	28	1.96
Total votes		1,429	100.0
N/A	Blank Votes	322	
N/A	Over Votes	1	
Democratic hold			

=== Bennington-4 ===
- The Bennington-4 district has 2 seats.

Vermont House district Bennington-4 election, 2018
Party	Candidate	Votes	%
Democratic	Kathleen James	2,129	36.57
Democratic	Cynthia Browning (incumbent) (Note: Running as "Democratic/Republican")	1,938	33.29
Republican	Brian Keefe (incumbent)	1,731	29.73
Write-in	Total Write-ins	24	0.41
Total votes		5,822	100.0
N/A	Blank Votes	1,722	
N/A	Over Votes	2	

=== Bennington-Rutland ===
- The Bennington-Rutland district has 1 seat.

Vermont House district Bennington-Rutland election, 2018
Party	Candidate	Votes	%
Democratic	Linda Joy Sullivan (incumbent)	1,699	99.07
Write-in	Total Write-ins	16	0.93
Total votes			100.0
N/A	Blank Votes	249	
N/A	Over Votes	5	
Democratic hold			

=== Caledonia-1 ===
- The Caledonia-1 district has 1 seat.

Vermont House district Caledonia-1 election, 2018
Party	Candidate	Votes	%
Republican	Marcia Robinson Martel (incumbent)	1,397	95.36
Write-in	Jenny Nelson	10	0.68
Write-in	Jen D'Agostino	5	0.34
Write-in	Write-ins (other)	53	3.62
Total votes		1,465	100.0
N/A	Blank votes	383	
Republican hold			

=== Caledonia-2 ===
- The Caledonia-2 district has 1 seat.

Vermont House district Caledonia-2 election, 2018
Party	Candidate	Votes	%
Democratic	Joseph "Chip" Troiano (incumbent)	988	59.30
Republican	Lawrence Hamel	677	40.64
Write-in	Luke Gargulio	1	0.06
Total votes		1,666	100.0
N/A	Blank votes	38	
Democratic hold			

=== Caledonia-3 ===
- The Caledonia-3 district has 2 seats.

Vermont House district Caledonia-3 Republican primary election, 2018
Party	Candidate	Votes	%
Republican	Scott Beck (incumbent)	350	54.26
Republican	Brendan Hughes	281	43.57
Republican	Scott Campbell (write-in)	7	1.09
Write-in	Write-ins (other)	7	1.09
Total votes		645	100.0
N/A	Blank votes	205	

Vermont House district Caledonia-3 Democratic primary election, 2018
Party	Candidate	Votes	%
Democratic	Scott Campbell	403	52.27
Democratic	Jane Pompeo	345	44.75
Democratic	Scott Beck (write-in)	17	2.2
Write-in	Write-ins (other)	6	0.78
Total votes		771	100.0
N/A	Blank votes	267	

Vermont House district Caledonia-3 election, 2018
Party	Candidate	Votes	%
Republican	Scott Beck (incumbent)	1,297	28.71
Democratic	Scott Campbell	1,183	26.2
Republican	Brendan Hughes	1,077	23.84
Democratic	Jane Pompeo	959	21.23
Write-in	David Jones	1	0.02
Total votes		4,517	100.0
N/A	Over votes	13	
N/A	Blank votes	454	
Republican hold			
Democratic gain from Republican			

=== Caledonia-4 ===
- The Caledonia-4 district has 2 seats.

Vermont House district Caledonia-4 Republican primary election, 2018
Party	Candidate	Votes	%
Republican	Martha Feltus (incumbent)	306	37.87
Republican	Patrick Seymour	264	32.67
Republican	Robert Brooks	171	21.16
Republican	Fred Gorham (write-in)	64	7.92
Write-in	Write-ins (other)	3	0.37
Total votes		808	100.0
N/A	Blank votes	250	

Vermont House district Caledonia-4 Democratic primary election, 2018
Party	Candidate	Votes	%
Democratic	Dennis Labounty	280	87.23
Democratic	Martha Feltus (incumbent) (write-in)	14	4.36
Democratic	Patrick Seymour (write-in)	11	3.43
Democratic	Fred Gorham (write-in)	4	1.25
Write-in	Write-ins (other)	12	3.74
Total votes		321	100.0
N/A	Blank votes	381	

Vermont House district Caledonia-4 election, 2018
Party	Candidate	Votes	%
Republican	Martha Feltus (incumbent)	1,633	38.06
Republican	Patrick Seymour (Note: Originally was running as Independent; retiring Republican incumbent Rep. Richard Lawrence endorsed Seymour to run in the Republican primary, which he won.)	1,375	32.04
Democratic	Dennis Labounty	1,266	29.49
Write-in	Christian B. Hubbs	2	0.05
Write-in	Benjamin Robbins	2	0.05
Write-in	Catherine Toll	2	0.05
Write-in	Write-ins (other)	11	0.26
Total votes		4,291	100.0
N/A	Over votes	1	
N/A	Blank votes	1,248	
Republican hold			

=== Caledonia-Washington ===
- The Caledonia-Washington district has 1 seat.

Vermont House district Caledonia-Washington election, 2018
Party	Candidate	Votes	%
Democratic	Catherine "Kitty" Toll (incumbent)	1,853	97.32
Write-in	Craig Vance	14	0.74
Write-in	Steve Larrabee	5	0.26
Write-in	Write-ins (other)	32	1.68
Total votes		1,904	100.0
N/A	Over votes	11	
N/A	Blank votes	370	
Democratic hold			

=== Chittenden-1 ===
- The Chittenden-1 district has 1 seat.

Vermont House district Chittenden-1 election, 2018
Party	Candidate	Votes	%
Democratic	Marcia Gardner (incumbent)		
Republican	Terry Moultroup		
Total votes			100.0

=== Chittenden-2 ===
- The Chittenden-2 district has 2 seats.

Vermont House district Chittenden-2 Democratic primary election, 2018
Party	Candidate	Votes	%
Democratic	James McCullough (incumbent)	754	32.42
Democratic	Terence Macaig (incumbent)	667	28.68
Democratic	Anthony Jordick	537	23.09
Write-in	Total Write-ins	4	0.17
N/A	Blank Votes	364	15.65
Total votes		2,326	100.0

Vermont House district Chittenden-2 Republican primary election, 2018
Party	Candidate	Votes	%
Republican	Joy Limoge	354	34.77
Write-in	Total Write-ins	12	1.18
N/A	Blank Votes	652	64.05
Total votes		1,018	100.0

Vermont House district Chittenden-2 election, 2018
Party	Candidate	Votes	%
Republican	Joy Limoge		
Democratic	Terence Macaig (incumbent)		
Democratic	James McCullough (incumbent)		
Independent	Kathleen Orion		
Total votes			100.0

=== Chittenden-3 ===
- The Chittenden-3 district has 2 seats.

Vermont House district Chittenden-3 election, 2018
Party	Candidate	Votes	%
Democratic	Trevor Squirrell (incumbent)		
Democratic	George W. Till (incumbent)		
Total votes			100.0
Democratic hold			
Democratic hold			

=== Chittenden-4-1 ===
- The Chittenden-4-1 district has 1 seat.

Vermont House district Chittenden-4-1 election, 2018
Party	Candidate	Votes	%
Democratic	Michael Yantachka (incumbent)		
Total votes			100.0
Democratic hold			

=== Chittenden-4-2 ===
- The Chittenden-4-2 district has 1 seat.

Vermont House district Chittenden-4-2 election, 2018
Party	Candidate	Votes	%
Democratic	William J. Lippert, Jr. (incumbent)		
Republican	Sarah Toscano		
Total votes			100.0

=== Chittenden-5-1 ===
- The Chittenden-5-1 district has 1 seat.

Vermont House district Chittenden-5-1 election, 2018
Party	Candidate	Votes	%
Democratic	Kate Webb (incumbent)		
Total votes			100.0
Democratic hold			

=== Chittenden-5-2 ===
- The Chittenden-5-2 district has 1 seat.

Vermont House district Chittenden-5-2 election, 2018
Party	Candidate	Votes	%
Democratic	Jessica Brumsted (incumbent)		
Total votes			100.0
Democratic hold			

=== Chittenden-6-1 ===
- The Chittenden-6-1 district has 2 seats.

Vermont House district Chittenden-6-1 election, 2018
Party	Candidate	Votes	%
Democratic	Robert Hooper		
Democratic	Carol Ode (incumbent)		
Republican	Kurt Wright (incumbent)		
Total votes			100.0

=== Chittenden-6-2 ===
- The Chittenden-6-2 district has 1 seat.

Vermont House district Chittenden-6-2 election, 2018
Party	Candidate	Votes	%
Democratic	Jean O'Sullivan (incumbent)		
Total votes			100.0
Democratic hold			

=== Chittenden-6-3 ===
- The Chittenden-6-3 district has 2 seats.

Vermont House district Chittenden-6-3 election, 2018
Party	Candidate	Votes	%
Democratic	Jill Krowinski (incumbent)		
Democratic	Curtis McCormack (incumbent)		
Total votes			100.0
Democratic hold			
Democratic hold			

=== Chittenden-6-4 ===
- The Chittenden-6-4 district has 2 seats.

Vermont House district Chittenden-6-4 election, 2018
Party	Candidate	Votes	%
Progressive	Brian Cina (incumbent) (Note: Running as "Progressive/Democratic")		
Progressive	Selene Colburn (incumbent)		
Total votes			100.0
Progressive hold			
Progressive hold			

=== Chittenden-6-5 ===
- The Chittenden-6-5 district has 2 seats.

Vermont House district Chittenden-6-5 election, 2018
Party	Candidate	Votes	%
Democratic	Johannah Donovan (incumbent)		
Democratic	Mary Sullivan (incumbent)		
Total votes			100.0
Democratic hold			
Democratic hold			

=== Chittenden-6-6 ===
- The Chittenden-6-6 district has 1 seat.

Vermont House district Chittenden-6-6 election, 2018
Party	Candidate	Votes	%
Democratic	Barbara Rachelson (incumbent)		
Total votes			100.0
Democratic hold			

=== Chittenden-6-7 ===
- The Chittenden-6-7 district has 2 seats.

Vermont House district Chittenden-6-7 election, 2018
Party	Candidate	Votes	%
Democratic	Clement Bissonnette (incumbent)		
Progressive	Diana Gonzalez (incumbent)		
Total votes			100.0
Democratic hold			
Progressive hold			

=== Chittenden-7-1 ===
- The Chittenden-7-1 district has 1 seat.

Vermont House district Chittenden-7-1 election, 2018
Party	Candidate	Votes	%
Democratic	Martin LaLonde (incumbent)		
Total votes			100.0
Democratic hold			

=== Chittenden-7-2 ===
- The Chittenden-7-2 district has 1 seat.

Vermont House district Chittenden-7-2 election, 2018
Party	Candidate	Votes	%
Democratic	Ann Pugh (incumbent)		
Total votes			100.0
Democratic hold			

=== Chittenden-7-3 ===
- The Chittenden-7-3 district has 1 seat.

Vermont House district Chittenden-7-3 election, 2018
Party	Candidate	Votes	%
Progressive	Frank Davis		
Democratic	John Killacky		
Total votes			100.0

=== Chittenden-7-4 ===
- The Chittenden-7-4 district has 1 seat.

Vermont House district Chittenden-7-4 election, 2018
Party	Candidate	Votes	%
Democratic	Maida Townsend (incumbent)		
Total votes			100.0
Democratic hold			

=== Chittenden-8-1 ===
- The Chittenden-8-1 district has 2 seats.

Vermont House district Chittenden-8-1 election, 2018
Party	Candidate	Votes	%
Republican	Linda K. Myers (incumbent)		
Democratic	Marybeth Redmond		
Progressive	Tanya Vyhovsky		
Total votes			100.0

=== Chittenden-8-2 ===
- The Chittenden-8-2 district has 2 seats.

Vermont House district Chittenden-8-2 election, 2018
Party	Candidate	Votes	%
Republican	John Brennan		
Democratic	Dylan Giambatista (incumbent)		
Democratic	Lori Houghton (incumbent)		
Total votes			100.0

=== Chittenden-8-3 ===
- The Chittenden-8-3 district has 1 seat.

Vermont House district Chittenden-8-3 election, 2018
Party	Candidate	Votes	%
Republican	Robert Bancroft (incumbent)		
Total votes			100.0
Republican hold			

=== Chittenden-9-1 ===
- The Chittenden-9-1 district has 2 seats.

Vermont House district Chittenden-9-1 election, 2018
Party	Candidate	Votes	%
Democratic	Seth Chase		
Republican	Deserae Morin		
Republican	Clark Sweeney		
Democratic	Curt Taylor (incumbent)		
Total votes			100.0

=== Chittenden-9-2 ===
- The Chittenden-9-2 district has 2 seats.
- Due to a tie on the August 14 primary election day, a re-vote for the final spot of the Republican line a re-vote was held on September 10, 2018. Pam Loranger defeated John Nagle III in the runoff.

Vermont House district Chittenden-9-2 Republican primary election, 2018
Party	Candidate	Votes	%
Republican	Patrick Brennan (incumbent)		
Total votes			100.0

Vermont House district Chittenden-9-2 Republican primary election Runoff
Party	Candidate	Votes	%
Republican	Pam Loranger	303	91.27
Republican	John Nagle III	29	8.73
Total votes		332	100.0

Vermont House district Chittenden-9-2 Democratic primary election, 2018
Party	Candidate	Votes	%
Democratic	Sarita Austin	529	32.49
Democratic	Herb Downing	497	30.53
Write-in	Total Write-ins	51	3.13
N/A	Blank Votes	551	33.85
Total votes		1,628	100.0

Vermont House district Chittenden-9-2 election, 2018
Party	Candidate	Votes	%
Democratic	Sarita Austin		
Republican	Patrick Brennan (incumbent)		
Democratic	Herb Downing		
Republican	Pam Loranger		
Total votes			100.0

=== Chittenden-10 ===
- The Chittenden-10 district has 2 seats.

Vermont House district Chittenden-10 election, 2018
Party	Candidate	Votes	%
Democratic	Todd Buik		
Republican	Christopher Mattos (incumbent)		
Republican	John Palasik		
Total votes			100.0

=== Essex-Caledonia ===
- The Essex-Caledonia district has 1 seat.

Vermont House district Essex-Caledonia election, 2018
Party	Candidate	Votes	%
Republican	Connie Quimby (incumbent)	1,082	95.33
Write-in	Ed Clark	10	0.88
Write-in	Judith Hutchinson	4	0.35
Write-in	Write-ins (other)	39	3.44
Total votes		1,135	100.0
N/A	Blank votes	280	
Republican hold			

=== Essex-Caledonia-Orleans ===
- The Essex-Caledonia-Orleans district has 1 seat.

Vermont House district Essex-Caledonia-Orleans election, 2018
Party	Candidate	Votes	%
Republican	Paul D. Lefebvre (incumbent)	827	55.39
Democratic	Martha W. Allen	664	44.47
Write-in	Write-ins	2	0.134
Total votes		1,493	100.0
N/A	Blank votes	38	

=== Franklin-1 ===
- The Franklin-1 district has 1 seat.

Vermont House district Franklin-1 election, 2018
Party	Candidate	Votes	%
Republican	Carl Rosenquist (incumbent)		
Democratic	Edward Simon		
Total votes			100.0

=== Franklin-2 ===
- The Franklin-2 district has 1 seat.

Vermont House district Franklin-2 election, 2018
Party	Candidate	Votes	%
Republican	Mary Beerworth		
Independent	Barbara Murphy (incumbent)		
Total votes			100.0

=== Franklin-3-1 ===
- The Franklin-3-1 district has 2 seats.

Vermont House district Franklin-3-1 election, 2018
Party	Candidate	Votes	%
Republican	James B. Fitzgerald		
Democratic	Kate Larose		
Democratic	Mike McCarthy		
Republican	Casey Toof		
Total votes			100.0

=== Franklin-3-2 ===
- The Franklin-3-2 district has 1 seat.

Vermont House district Franklin-3-2 election, 2018
Party	Candidate	Votes	%
Republican	Eileen Dickinson (incumbent) (Note: Running as "Republican/Democratic")		
Independent	David McWilliams		
Total votes			100.0

=== Franklin-4 ===
- The Franklin-4 district has 2 seats.

Vermont House district Franklin-4 election, 2018
Party	Candidate	Votes	%
Democratic	Nicholas Brosseau		
Republican	Marianna Gamache (incumbent)		
Republican	Brian K. Savage (incumbent)		
Total votes			100.0
Republican hold			

=== Franklin-5 ===
- The Franklin-5 district has 2 seats.

Vermont House district Franklin-5 election, 2018
Party	Candidate	Votes	%
Republican	Joshua Aldrich		
Independent	Linda Collins		
Democratic	Charen Fegard		
Democratic	Daniel Nadeau		
Republican	Shane Rhodes		
Total votes			100.0

=== Franklin-6 ===
- The Franklin-6 district has 1 seat.

Vermont House district Franklin-6 election, 2018
Party	Candidate	Votes	%
Democratic	Kelly Cummings		
Republican	James Gregoire		
Total votes			100.0

=== Franklin-7 ===
- The Franklin-7 district has 1 seat.

Vermont House district Franklin-7 election, 2018
Party	Candidate	Votes	%
Republican	Felisha Leffler		
Progressive	Cindy Weed (incumbent)		
Total votes			100.0

=== Grand Isle-Chittenden ===
- The Grand Isle-Chittenden district has 2 seats.

Vermont House district Grand Isle-Chittenden election, 2018
Party	Candidate	Votes	%
Democratic	Mitzi Johnson (incumbent)		
Democratic	Ben W. Joseph (incumbent)		
Republican	Leland Morgan		
Republican	Michael Morgan		
Total votes			100.0

=== Lamoille-1 ===
- The Lamoille-1 district has 1 seat.

Vermont House district Lamoille-1 election, 2018
Party	Candidate	Votes	%
Democratic	Marina Meerburg		
Republican	Heidi E. Scheuermann (incumbent)		
Total votes			100.0

=== Lamoille-2 ===
- The Lamoille-2 district has 2 seats.

Vermont House district Lamoille-2 election, 2018
Party	Candidate	Votes	%
Democratic	Matthew Hill (incumbent)		
Independent	Mike King		
Democratic	Daniel Noyes (incumbent)		
Total votes			100.0
Democratic hold			

=== Lamoille-3 ===
- The Lamoille-3 district has 1 seat.

Vermont House district Lamoille-3 election, 2018
Party	Candidate	Votes	%
Republican	Zachary Mayo		
Democratic	Lucy Rogers		
Total votes			100.0

=== Lamoille-Washington ===
- The Lamoille-Washington district has 2 seats.

Vermont House district Lamoille-Washington election, 2018
Party	Candidate	Votes	%
Republican	Gary Nolan (incumbent)		
Democratic	Avram Patt		
Democratic	David Yacovone (incumbent)		
Total votes			100.0
Democratic hold			

=== Orange-1 ===
- The Orange-1 district has 2 seats.

Vermont House district Orange-1 election, 2018
Party	Candidate	Votes	%
Republican	Christopher Covey		
Progressive	Susan Hatch Davis		
Democratic	Carl Demrow		
Republican	Rodney Graham (incumbent)		
Total votes			100.0

=== Orange-2 ===
- The Orange-2 district has 1 seat.

Vermont House district Orange-2 election, 2018
Party	Candidate	Votes	%
Democratic	Sarah Copeland-Hanzas (incumbent)		
Total votes			100.0
Democratic hold			

=== Orange-Caledonia ===
- The Orange-Caledonia district has 1 seat.

Vermont House district Orange-Caledonia election, 2018
Party	Candidate	Votes	%
Democratic	Charles "Chip" Conquest (incumbent)	863	51.13
Republican	Joseph Parsons	813	48.16
Write-in	Boots Wardinski	11	0.65
Write-in	Write-ins (other)	1	0.06
Total votes		1,688	100.0
N/A	Over votes	1	
N/A	Blank votes	30	
Democratic hold			

=== Orange-Washington-Addison ===
- The Orange-Washington-Addison district has 2 seats.

Vermont House district Orange-Washington-Addison election, 2018
Party	Candidate	Votes	%
Republican	Daniel Brown		
Democratic	Jay Hooper (incumbent)		
Independent	Ben Jickling (incumbent)		
Democratic	Larry Satcowitz		
Republican	Stephen Webster		
Total votes			100.0

=== Orleans-1 ===
- The Orleans-1 district has 2 seats.

Vermont House district Orleans-1 election, 2018
Party	Candidate	Votes	%
Republican	Lynn Batchelor (incumbent)	1,721	36.7%
Independent	Frank Davis	1,088	23.2%
Republican	Brian Smith (incumbent)	1,862	36.7%
Total votes		6,198	100.0

=== Orleans-2 ===
- The Orleans-2 district has 2 seats.

Vermont House district Orleans-2 Republican primary election, 2018
Party	Candidate	Votes	%
Republican	Michael Marcotte (incumbent)	491	46.2
Republican	Woodman "Woody" Page	401	37.7
Republican	Kendall Lambert	171	16.1
Total votes		1,063	100.0

Vermont House district Orleans-2 election, 2018
Party	Candidate	Votes	%
Independent	Kendall Lambert		
Republican	Michael Marcotte (incumbent)		
Republican	Woodman "Woody" Page		
Total votes			100.0
Republican hold			

=== Orleans-Caledonia ===
- The Orleans-Caledonia district has 2 seats.

Vermont House district Orleans-Caledonia election, 2018
Party	Candidate	Votes	%
Independent	Tabitha Armstrong		
Democratic	Danielle Cote Sukkaew		
Republican	Frank Huard		
Republican	Vicki Strong (incumbent)		
Democratic	Sam Young (incumbent)		
Total votes			100.0

=== Orleans-Lamoille ===
- The Orleans-Lamoille district has 1 seat.

Vermont House district Orleans-Lamoille election, 2018
Party	Candidate	Votes	%
Republican	Mark Higley (incumbent)		
Total votes			100.0
Republican hold			

=== Rutland-1 ===
- The Rutland-1 district has 1 seat.

Vermont House district Rutland-1 election, 2018
Party	Candidate	Votes	%
Republican	Patricia McCoy (incumbent)		
Total votes			100.0
Republican hold			

=== Rutland-2 ===
- The Rutland-2 district has 2 seats.

Vermont House district Rutland-2 election, 2018
Party	Candidate	Votes	%
Republican	Thomas Burditt (incumbent)		
Democratic	Ken Fredette		
Democratic	David Potter (incumbent)		
Total votes			100.0

=== Rutland-3 ===
- The Rutland-3 district has 2 seats.

Vermont House district Rutland-3 election, 2018
Party	Candidate	Votes	%
Republican	William Canfield (incumbent)		
Republican	Robert Helm (incumbent)		
Independent	Robert J. Richards		
Total votes			100.0
Republican hold			

=== Rutland-4 ===
- The Rutland-4 district has 1 seat.

Vermont House district Rutland-4 election, 2018
Party	Candidate	Votes	%
Republican	Thomas Terenzini (incumbent)		
Total votes			100.0
Republican hold			

=== Rutland-5-1 ===
- The Rutland-5-1 district has 1 seat.

Vermont House district Rutland-5-1 election, 2018
Party	Candidate	Votes	%
Republican	Peter J. Fagan (incumbent)		
Democratic	Heather Juliussen-Stevenson		
Total votes			100.0

=== Rutland-5-2 ===
- The Rutland-5-2 district has 1 seat.

Vermont House district Rutland-5-2 election, 2018
Party	Candidate	Votes	%
Republican	Lawrence Cupoli (incumbent)		
Total votes			100.0
Republican hold			

=== Rutland-5-3 ===
- The Rutland-5-3 district has 1 seat.

Vermont House district Rutland-5-3 election, 2018
Party	Candidate	Votes	%
Democratic	Mary Howard (incumbent)		
Total votes			100.0
Democratic hold			

=== Rutland-5-4 ===
- The Rutland-5-4 district has 1 seat.

Vermont House district Rutland-5-4 election, 2018
Party	Candidate	Votes	%
Republican	Jacqueline Fleck		
Democratic	William Notte		
Total votes			100.0

=== Rutland-6 ===
- The Rutland-6 district has 2 seats.

Vermont House district Rutland-6 election, 2018
Party	Candidate	Votes	%
Progressive	Tim Guiles		
Republican	Seth Hopkins		
Democratic	Stephanie Jerome		
Republican	Charles "Butch" Shaw (incumbent)		
Total votes			100.0

=== Rutland-Bennington ===
- The Rutland-Bennington district has 1 seat.

Vermont House district Rutland-Bennington election, 2018
Party	Candidate	Votes	%
Progressive	Robin Chestnut-Tangerman (incumbent)		
Republican	Edgar Cleveland		
Total votes			100.0

=== Rutland-Windsor-1 ===
- The Rutland-Windsor-1 district has 1 seat.

Vermont House district Rutland-Windsor-1 election, 2018
Party	Candidate	Votes	%
Republican	James Harrison (incumbent)		
Democratic	Gina Ottoboni		
Total votes			100.0

=== Rutland-Windsor-2 ===
- The Rutland-Windsor-2 district has 1 seat.

Vermont House district Rutland-Windsor-2 election, 2018
Party	Candidate	Votes	%
Independent	Peter Berger		
Democratic	Logan Nicoll		
Total votes			100.0

=== Washington-1 ===
- The Washington-1 district has 2 seats.

Vermont House district Washington-1 Republican primary election, 2018
Party	Candidate	Votes	%
Republican	Anne Donahue (incumbent)	483	35.78
Republican	Kenneth Goslant	452	33.48
Write-in	Total Write-ins	9	0.67
N/A	Blank Votes	406	30.07
Total votes		1,350	100.0

Vermont House district Washington-1 Democratic primary election, 2018
Party	Candidate	Votes	%
Democratic	Denise MacMartin	415	36.1
Democratic	Jeremy Hansen	394	34.3
Democratic	John B. Stevens	258	22.5
Democratic	Gordon Bock	82	7.1
Total votes		1,149	100.0

Vermont House district Washington-1 election, 2018
Party	Candidate	Votes	%
Independent	Gordon Bock (Note: Running as "Berlin-Northfield Alliance")		
Republican	Anne Donahue (incumbent)		
Republican	Kenneth Goslant		
Progressive	Jeremy Hansen		
Democratic	Denise MacMartin		
Independent	Rebecca A. Trower		
Total votes			100.0

=== Washington-2 ===
- The Washington-2 district has 2 seats.

Vermont House district Washington-2 election, 2018
Party	Candidate	Votes	%
Democratic	J. Guy Isabelle		
Republican	Robert LaClair (incumbent)		
Republican	Francis McFaun (incumbent)		
Total votes			100.0
Republican hold			

=== Washington-3 ===
- The Washington-3 district has 2 seats.

Vermont House district Washington-3 Democratic primary election, 2018
Party	Candidate	Votes	%
Democratic	Tommy Walz (incumbent)	451	46.6
Democratic	Peter Anthony	351	36.3
Democratic	Paul Flint	166	17.1
Total votes		968	100.0

Vermont House district Washington-3 Republican primary election, 2018
Party	Candidate	Votes	%
Republican	John Steinman	334	39.11
Write-in	Total Write-ins	20	2.34
N/A	Blank Votes	500	58.55
Total votes		854	100.0

Vermont House district Washington-3 election, 2018
Party	Candidate	Votes	%
Democratic	Peter Anthony		
Independent	Paul N. Poirier (incumbent)		
Republican	John Steinman		
Democratic	Tommy Walz (incumbent)		
Total votes			100.0

=== Washington-4 ===
- The Washington-4 district has 2 seats.

Vermont House district Washington-4 election, 2018
Party	Candidate	Votes	%
Democratic	Mary Hooper (incumbent)		
Democratic	Warren Kitzmiller (incumbent)		
Progressive	Glennie Sewell		
Total votes			100.0

=== Washington-5 ===
- The Washington-5 district has 1 seat.

Vermont House district Washington-5 election, 2018
Party	Candidate	Votes	%
Democratic	Kimberly Jessup (incumbent)		
Total votes			100.0
Democratic hold			

=== Washington-6 ===
- The Washington-6 district has 1 seat.

Vermont House district Washington-6 election, 2018
Party	Candidate	Votes	%
Democratic	Janet Ancel (incumbent)		
Total votes			100.0
Democratic hold			

=== Washington-7 ===
- The Washington-7 district has 2 seats.

Vermont House district Washington-7 election, 2018
Party	Candidate	Votes	%
Democratic	Kari Dolan	2,590	33.12%
Democratic	Maxine Grad (incumbent)	2,340	29.93%
Independent	Ed Read (incumbent) (Note: Won the Republican nomination, but will run as an independent in the general election.)	1,982	25.35%
Independent	Bob Readie	517	6.61
Green Mountain	Neil Johnson	385	4.92
Independent	Write-in	5	0.06%
Total votes		7,819	100.0

=== Washington-Chittenden ===
- The Washington-Chittenden district has 2 seats.

Vermont House district Washington-Chittenden election, 2018
Party	Candidate	Votes	%
Democratic	Thomas Stevens (incumbent)		
Democratic	Theresa Wood (incumbent)		
Total votes			100.0
Democratic hold			
Democratic hold			

=== Windham-1 ===
- The Windham-1 district has 1 seat.

Vermont House district Windham-1 election, 2018
Party	Candidate	Votes	%
Democratic	Sara Coffey		
Republican	Patrick Gilligan		
Total votes			100.0

=== Windham-2-1 ===
- The Windham-2-1 district has 1 seat.

Vermont House district Windham-2-1 Democratic primary election, 2018
Party	Candidate	Votes	%
Democratic	Emilie Kornheiser	589	70.71
Democratic	Valerie A. Stuart (incumbent)	227	27.25
Write-in	Total Write-ins	1	0.12
N/A	Blank Votes	16	1.92
Total votes		833	100.0

Vermont House district Windham-2-1 election, 2018
Party	Candidate	Votes	%
Democratic	Emilie Kornheiser		
Total votes			100.0
Democratic hold			

=== Windham-2-2 ===
- The Windham-2-2 district has 1 seat.

Vermont House district Windham-2-2 election, 2018
Party	Candidate	Votes	%
Progressive	Mollie Burke (incumbent)		
Total votes			100.0
Progressive hold			

=== Windham-2-3 ===
- The Windham-2-3 district has 1 seat.

Vermont House district Windham-2-3 election, 2018
Party	Candidate	Votes	%
Democratic	Tristan Toleno (incumbent)		
Total votes			100.0
Democratic hold			

=== Windham-3 ===
- The Windham-3 district has 2 seats.

Vermont House district Windham-3 election, 2018
Party	Candidate	Votes	%
Democratic	Carolyn Partridge (incumbent)		
Democratic	Matthew Trieber (incumbent)		
Total votes			100.0
Democratic hold			
Democratic hold			

=== Windham-4 ===
- The Windham-4 district has 2 seats.

Vermont House district Windham-4 Democratic primary election, 2018
Party	Candidate	Votes	%
Democratic	Michael Mrowicki (incumbent)	1,210	40.4
Democratic	Nader Hashim	1,076	35.9
Democratic	Cindy Jerome	708	23.6
Total votes		2,994	100.0

Vermont House district Windham-4 election, 2018
Party	Candidate	Votes	%
Democratic	Nader Hashim		
Democratic	Michael Mrowicki (incumbent)		
Total votes			100.0
Democratic hold			
Democratic hold			

=== Windham-5 ===
- The Windham-5 district has 1 seat.

Vermont House district Windham-5 election, 2018
Party	Candidate	Votes	%
Democratic	Emily Long (incumbent)		
Total votes			100.0
Democratic hold			

=== Windham-6 ===
- The Windham-6 district has 1 seat.

Vermont House district Windham-6 election, 2018
Party	Candidate	Votes	%
Democratic	John Gannon (incumbent)		
Total votes			100.0
Democratic hold			

=== Windham-Bennington ===
- The Windham-Bennington district has 1 seat.

Vermont House district Windham-Bennington election, 2018
Party	Candidate	Votes	%
Independent	Laura Sibilia (incumbent) (Note: Won the nominations of the Progressive Party, Republican Party, and Democratic Party all via write-in, but running as Independent in the general election.)		
Total votes			100.0
Independent hold			

=== Windham-Bennington-Windsor ===
- The Windham-Bennington-Windsor district has 1 seat.

Vermont House district Windham-Bennington-Windsor election, 2018
Party	Candidate	Votes	%
Independent	Kelly Pajala (incumbent) (Note: Won the nominations of the Republican Party and Democratic Party via write-in, but running as Independent in the general election.)		
Total votes			100.0
Independent hold			

=== Windsor-1 ===
- The Windsor-1 district has 2 seats.

Vermont House district Windsor-1 Democratic primary election, 2018
Party	Candidate	Votes	%
Democratic	John L. Bartholomew (incumbent)	673	35.78
Democratic	Zachariah Ralph	656	34.88
Democratic	Paul Belaski (incumbent)	544	28.92
Write-in	Wesley Raney	4	0.21
Write-in	Write-ins (other)	4	0.21
Total votes		1,881	100.0
N/A	Over votes	5	
N/A	Blank votes	408	

Vermont House district Windsor-1 Progressive primary election, 2018
Party	Candidate	Votes	%
Progressive	Zachariah Ralph (write-in)	13	65.0
Write-in	Write-ins (other)	7	35.0
Total votes		20	100.0
N/A	Blank votes	10	

Vermont House district Windsor-1 Republican primary election, 2018
Party	Candidate	Votes	%
Republican	Wesley Raney	267	88.41
Republican	Paul Belaski (incumbent) (write-in)	14	4.64
Republican	John L. Bartholomew (incumbent) (write-in)	7	2.32
Write-in	Write-ins (other)	14	4.64
Total votes		302	100.0
N/A	Blank votes	458	

Vermont House district Windsor-1 election, 2018
Party	Candidate	Votes	%
Democratic	John L. Bartholomew (incumbent)	2,218	40.67
Progressive	Zachariah Ralph	2,040	37.40
Republican	Wesley Raney	1,152	21.12
Write-in	Paul Belaski (incumbent)	19	0.35
Write-in	Michael Kell	6	0.11
Write-in	Write-ins (other)	18	0.33
Total votes		5,454	100.0
N/A	Blank votes	1,908	
Democratic hold			
Progressive gain from Democratic			

=== Windsor-2 ===
- The Windsor-2 district has 1 seat.

Vermont House district Windsor-2 election, 2018
Party	Candidate	Votes	%
Democratic	Annmarie Christensen (incumbent)		
Total votes			100.0
Democratic hold			

=== Windsor-3-1 ===
- The Windsor-3-1 district has 1 seat.

Vermont House district Windsor-3-1 election, 2018
Party	Candidate	Votes	%
Democratic	Thomas Bock (incumbent)		
Total votes			100.0
Democratic hold			

=== Windsor-3-2 ===
- The Windsor-3-2 district has 2 seats.

Vermont House district Windsor-3-2 election, 2018
Party	Candidate	Votes	%
Democratic	Alice M. Emmons (incumbent)		
Democratic	Robert Forguites (incumbent)		
Republican	Elizabeth Gray		
Progressive	George T. McNaughton		
Total votes			100.0

=== Windsor-4-1 ===
- The Windsor-4-1 district has 1 seat.

Vermont House district Windsor-4-1 election, 2018
Party	Candidate	Votes	%
Democratic	Randall Szott		
Total votes			100.0
Democratic hold			

=== Windsor-4-2 ===
- The Windsor-4-2 district has 2 seats.

Vermont House district Windsor-4-2 election, 2018
Party	Candidate	Votes	%
Democratic	Kevin "Coach" Christie (incumbent)		
Democratic	Rebecca White		
Total votes			100.0
Democratic hold			
Democratic hold			

=== Windsor-5 ===
- The Windsor-5 district has 1 seat.

Vermont House district Windsor-5 election, 2018
Party	Candidate	Votes	%
Democratic	Charles Kimbell (incumbent)		
Total votes			100.0
Democratic hold			

=== Windsor-Orange-1 ===
- The Windsor-Orange-1 district has 1 seat.

Vermont House district Windsor-Orange-1 election, 2018
Party	Candidate	Votes	%
Republican	David Ainsworth (incumbent)		
Democratic	John O'Brien		
Total votes			100.0

=== Windsor-Orange-2 ===
- The Windsor-Orange-2 district has 2 seats.

Vermont House district Windsor-Orange-2 election, 2018
Party	Candidate	Votes	%
Democratic	Timothy Briglin (incumbent)		
Progressive	Nick Clark		
Independent	John Freitag		
Democratic	James Masland (incumbent)		
Progressive	Jill Wilcox		
Total votes			100.0

=== Windsor-Rutland ===
- The Windsor-Rutland district has 1 seat.

Vermont House district Windsor-Rutland election, 2018
Party	Candidate	Votes	%
Progressive	Sandy Haas (incumbent)		
Republican	Robert McFadden		
Total votes			100.0

== See also ==
- United States elections, 2018
- United States Senate election in Vermont, 2018
- United States House of Representatives election in Vermont, 2018
- Vermont gubernatorial election, 2018
- Vermont State Senate election, 2018
- Vermont elections, 2018
