= Same-sex marriage in Vermont =

Same-sex marriage has been legal in Vermont since September 1, 2009. The Vermont Senate passed same-sex marriage legislation on March 23, which the House of Representatives amended and approved by a 94–52 vote on April 3, 2009. Governor Jim Douglas vetoed the bill as promised on April 6. Both the House and the Senate successfully overrode Douglas' veto the following day. The law went into effect on September 1, making Vermont the fourth U.S. state, after Massachusetts, Connecticut, and Iowa, to legalize same-sex marriage, (Note: Excluding California which had constitutionally banned same-sex marriage in November 2008, but still recognized marriages performed between June and November 2008.) and the first to introduce same-sex marriage by enacting a statute without being required to do so by a court decision. Polling suggests that an overwhelming majority of Vermont residents support the legal recognition of same-sex marriage, with a 2024 Public Religion Research Institute poll showing that 86% of respondents supported it.

Vermont was also the first U.S. state to introduce civil unions on July 1, 2000, following a ruling from the Supreme Court in Baker v. Vermont that the Constitution of Vermont entitles same-sex couples to "the same benefits and protections afforded by Vermont law to married opposite-sex couples".

== Background ==
Either by legislation or court decisions, Vermont was a leader among U.S. jurisdictions in protecting the rights of gays and lesbians in the 1990s. In 1990, it was one of the first states to enact hate crime legislation that included sexual orientation. In 1992, it added sexual orientation to its anti-discrimination statute. In 1993, the Vermont Supreme Court in a unanimous ruling established second-parent adoption rights, allowing someone in a same-sex relationship to adopt his or her partner's biological children. When the Vermont General Assembly reformed the state's adoption statute in 1995, it made same-sex couples eligible to adopt.

In 1995, Pasha Rivers-McMahon appeared alone at city hall in South Burlington to apply for a marriage license for her and her partner Penny Rivers-McMahon. The office issued a license, but ten minutes later, after realizing that the couple were in fact a same-sex couple, called to request that the license be returned. The couple refused, but the city's attorney refused to allow it to be registered.

== Civil unions ==
=== Baker v. Vermont ===
On July 22, 1997, three same-sex couples sued the state and the Shelburne, South Burlington, and Milton town clerks that had denied them marriage licenses in the Chittenden County Superior Court. The couples were Stan Baker and Peter Harrigan, Nina Beck and Stacy Jolles, and Lois Farnham and Holly Puterbaugh. They lost in the trial court on December 19. The court ruled that Vermont's statutes limiting marriage to different-sex couples were constitutional because they served the public interest by promoting "the link between procreation and child rearing". The Vermont Supreme Court heard the case on appeal, and on December 20, 1999 ruled in Baker v. Vermont that the Constitution of Vermont entitles same-sex couples to "the same benefits and protections afforded by Vermont law to married opposite-sex couples". The court did not give the plaintiffs the relief they sought. Instead of ordering state officials to allow same-sex couples to marry, it invited the General Assembly to devise a solution:

We hold that the State is constitutionally required to extend to same-sex couples the common benefits and protections that flow from marriage under Vermont law. Whether this ultimately takes the form of inclusion within the marriage laws themselves or a parallel "domestic partnership" system or some equivalent statutory alternative, rests with the Legislature. Whatever system is chosen, however, must conform with the constitutional imperative to afford all Vermonters the common benefit, protection, and security of the law.

The court set no deadline, but suspended its judgement for "a reasonable period". Mary Bonauto, one of the plaintiffs' attorneys, later described how advocates for same-sex marriage struggled to understand how they had won the judgment but not the right to marry: "[T]hey had this beautiful language in there about the humanity of gay people, but I couldn't believe they had done something that I thought was a political judgment. I had never heard of segregating the word marriage from its rights and protections."

=== Passage of legislation in 2000 ===
Same-sex marriage in the United States

When the House Judiciary Committee took up the question in February 2000, three of its members favored same-sex marriage, while eleven backed something equivalent that was discussed as a "civil rights package". The committee's chairman said that only the latter could pass the Assembly. The House of Representatives voted 76 to 69 in favor of legislation creating civil unions with the same legal rights and obligations as marriage on March 15, 2000. The legislation also defined marriage as the "union of a man and a woman". Debate in the Senate, where the bill was modified, was restrained. The Senate also defeated two proposed constitutional amendments designed to nullify the Baker decision, one that defined marriage as the "union of a man and a woman" and another that reserved to the Assembly all authority to define the benefits of marriage. The Senate passed the bill 19 to 11 on April 19, and the House passed it on April 25 on a 79 to 68 vote. Governor Howard Dean signed the legislation into law on April 26, without a public ceremony. Immediately after the signing, he held a press conference where he said:

There is much to celebrate about this bill. Those celebrations, as the subject of this bill, will be private. They will be celebrated by couples and their families, but people making commitments to each other.... I believe this bill enriches all of us as we look with new eyes at a group of people who have been outcasts for many, many generations.

The New York Times called Vermont's civil unions "same-sex marriages in almost everything but the name". Bonauto called the legislation "breathtaking". She said out-of-state couples would want to take advantage of the law, even though its impact for them would only be symbolic. The debate on civil unions was acrimonious and deeply polarizing, touching every corner of the state and spurring a prominent popular backlash that began even before the legislation was signed under the slogan "Take Back Vermont". As soon as civil union legislation was enacted, some clerks expressed reservations about participating. Gerry Longway, the Fairfield Town Clerk, said: "I'm not here to judge what people do, but I don't want to be forced to be part of it. It's like, if I don't believe in capital punishment, they're not going to make me pull the switch." As the July 1 start date approached, most seemed prepared to issue civil union licenses. On June 18, opponents of the legislation placed a full-page in The Burlington Free Press that described civil unions as the work of "the insufferable hubris of the narcissistic gay lobby that would place personal pleasures before public order." The first day for civil unions was a Saturday, when clerks offices are normally closed. A few opened because they had been asked to and a handful of licenses were issued and ceremonies held, including one for Holly Puterbaugh and Lois Farnham, plaintiffs in Baker, at the First Congregational Church in Burlington.

When the civil unions law went into effect on July 1, 2000, Vermont became the third U.S. state after Hawaii and California to offer legal status to same-sex couples, and the first to offer a civil union status encompassing the same legal rights and responsibilities as marriage.

=== 2000 elections and reactions ===
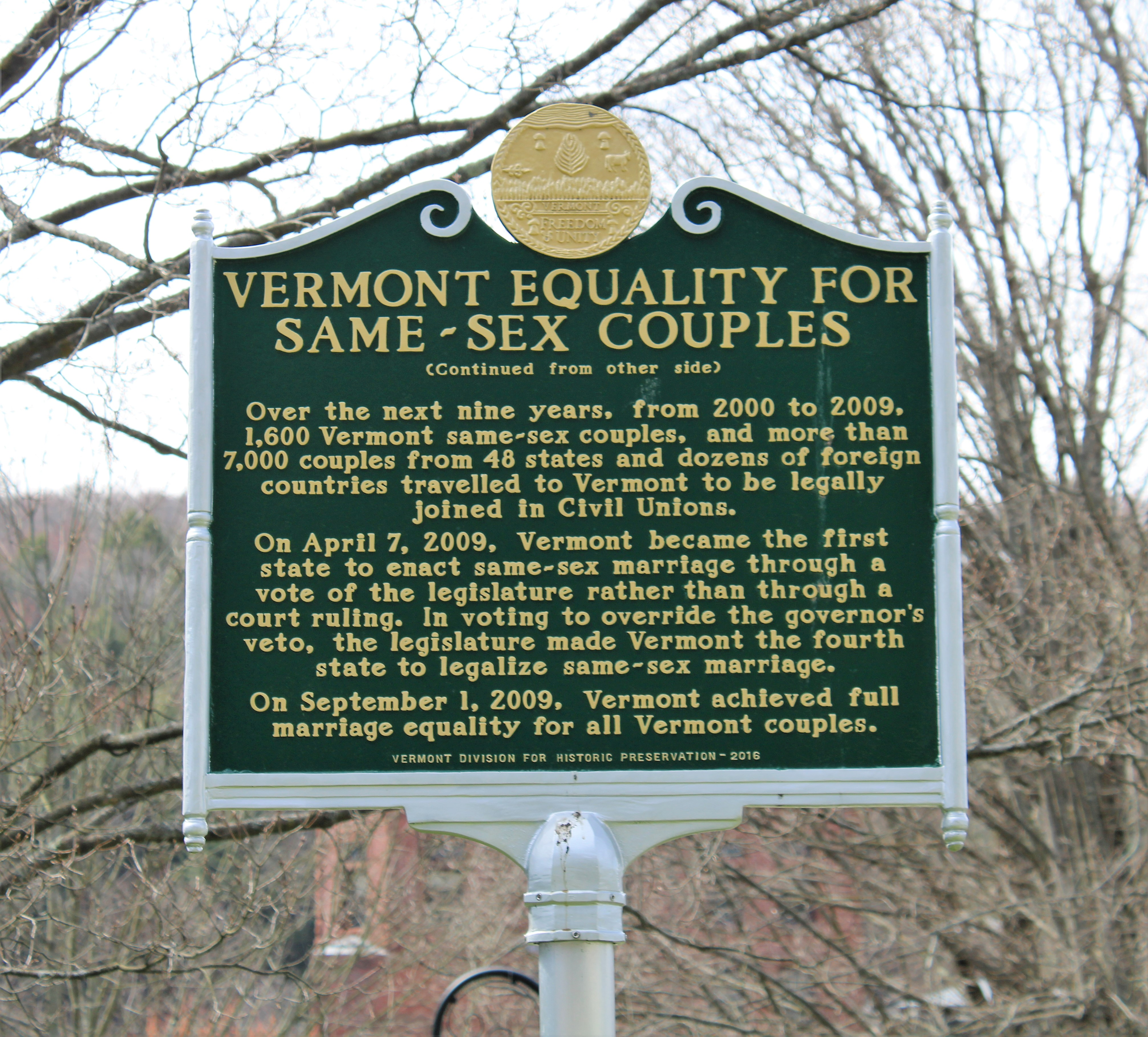
Historical marker in Montpelier commemorating the history of civil unions and same-sex marriages in Vermont

The November 2000 elections, with the Assembly and governorship at stake, became a referendum on civil unions. Opponents of civil unions adopted "Take Back Vermont" as their slogan and covered the landscape with their signs. It had been used previously to protest a property tax and represented anger at the state government across an array of issues even as the campaign's focus was on civil unions. The campaign hoped to win control of both houses of the Vermont Assembly for the Republicans and possibly even unseat Dean who had been governor since 1991. Garrison Nelson, a political science professor at the University of Vermont, called the fall campaign "a real, honest-to-goodness, social issue bonfire".

Six incumbent legislators who supported civil unions lost in the September primaries, five Republicans and one Democrat. One of the Republicans who lost was two-term Senator Peter Brownell, who described being lobbied by clergy on both sides and asked: "So whose religion am I obligated statutorily to abide by?" The Roman Catholic Bishop of Burlington, Kenneth Angell, testified against the civil union bill before a House committee and sent mailings with such headings as "How Would Jesus Vote?" and "Vote Your Informed Conscience." Both sides and candidates at all levels attracted unusual amounts of out-of-state money, including funds from the national political parties, and the amounts raised broke all records for political races in Vermont. An election day opinion poll by Voter News Service reported that Vermonters were evenly divided, and the election results were mixed. Dean won reelection and the Democrats held their majority in the Senate, which would block any attempt to repeal the civil union legislation, though their margin of control was just 16 to 14. In the primary and the general election combined, 16 incumbent supporters of civil unions were not returned to the Assembly. Republicans took control of the House for the first time in 14 years. Bishop Angell viewed it as a defeat: "I was very disappointed. We spent a great deal of time and effort trying to work for certain causes, and it just seems that we were not heard.... I never, ever thought in my lifetime that I would be trying to convince people that marriage is between a man and a woman. They call it civil unions here, but it's nothing more than marriage under another name." In the first half of 2001, the Vermont House of Representatives passed several bills to undo the civil union legislation. One replaced civil unions with "reciprocal partnerships" that any two persons could form, which could include blood relatives. None had a chance of passing the Senate or winning Dean's signature. At the same time, The Burlington Free Press and the Rutland Herald began printing announcements of civil unions just as they did wedding notices.

The question of the legal status of same-sex relationships was attracting increasing attention in other states. On election day 2000, Nevada and Nebraska passed measures amending their constitutions to define marriage as "the union of a man and a woman". Voters in Maine narrowly defeated a measure prohibiting discrimination on the basis of sexual orientation, which its supporters attributed in part to the fact that their opponents "had that little extra bit of ammunition regarding Vermont." In the spring of 2001, the legislatures of Rhode Island and Connecticut held hearings on civil union legislation, and in mid-April, seven couples filed a lawsuit to force Massachusetts to recognize same-sex marriages. In June 2004, Thomas C. Ely, the Episcopal Bishop of Vermont, announced rites for priests to use while blessing same-sex civil unions.

=== Statistics ===
In the first year that civil unions were available, 2,479 same-sex couples formed Vermont civil unions. Only 502 of those couples were Vermont residents. About two-thirds were women. Polls showed the public remained equally divided. Dean commented: "None of the dire predictions have come true. There was a big rhubarb, a lot of fear-mongering, and now people realize there was nothing to be afraid of." Civil unions were hardly mentioned as an issue in the 2002 gubernatorial election, a three-way race won by Jim Douglas, a Republican who was not interested in renewing the contentious debate. The gains made by opponents of civil unions receded in the Assembly in that year as well, as the Democrats grew their majority in the Senate and Republicans gave back some of their 2000 gains in the House. By October 8, 2004, 7,201 couples had entered into civil unions in Vermont. That November, even as eleven states voted for amendments to their constitutions that would ban same-sex marriage, several of which banned civil unions as well, in Vermont, Democrats took back control of the House of Representatives, and an exit poll conducted for the Associated Press reported that 40% of Vermont voters supported same-sex marriage, an additional 37% backed civil unions, and 21% supported neither. When same-sex marriage supporters in Massachusetts experienced no voter backlash that November, Marty Rouse, campaign director with the advocacy group MassEquality, said: "I think Vermont helped to educate Massachusetts. Because of the geographical proximity of the two states, Massachusetts residents got to see that equal marriage rights for same-sex couples were not as frightening as some might have thought."

The ability to enter a civil union ended on September 1, 2009, following the legalization of same-sex marriage. Civil unions performed prior to this date remain recognized, and couples may convert their relationships into marriages upon request. According to the Vermont Department of Health, almost 9,000 civil unions had taken place in Vermont up to 2009: 1,704 in 2000, 1,875 in 2001, 1,707 in 2002, 1,397 in 2003, 712 in 2004, 452 in 2005, 429 in 2006, 352 in 2007, 268 in 2008, and 100 in 2009.

== Same-sex marriage ==
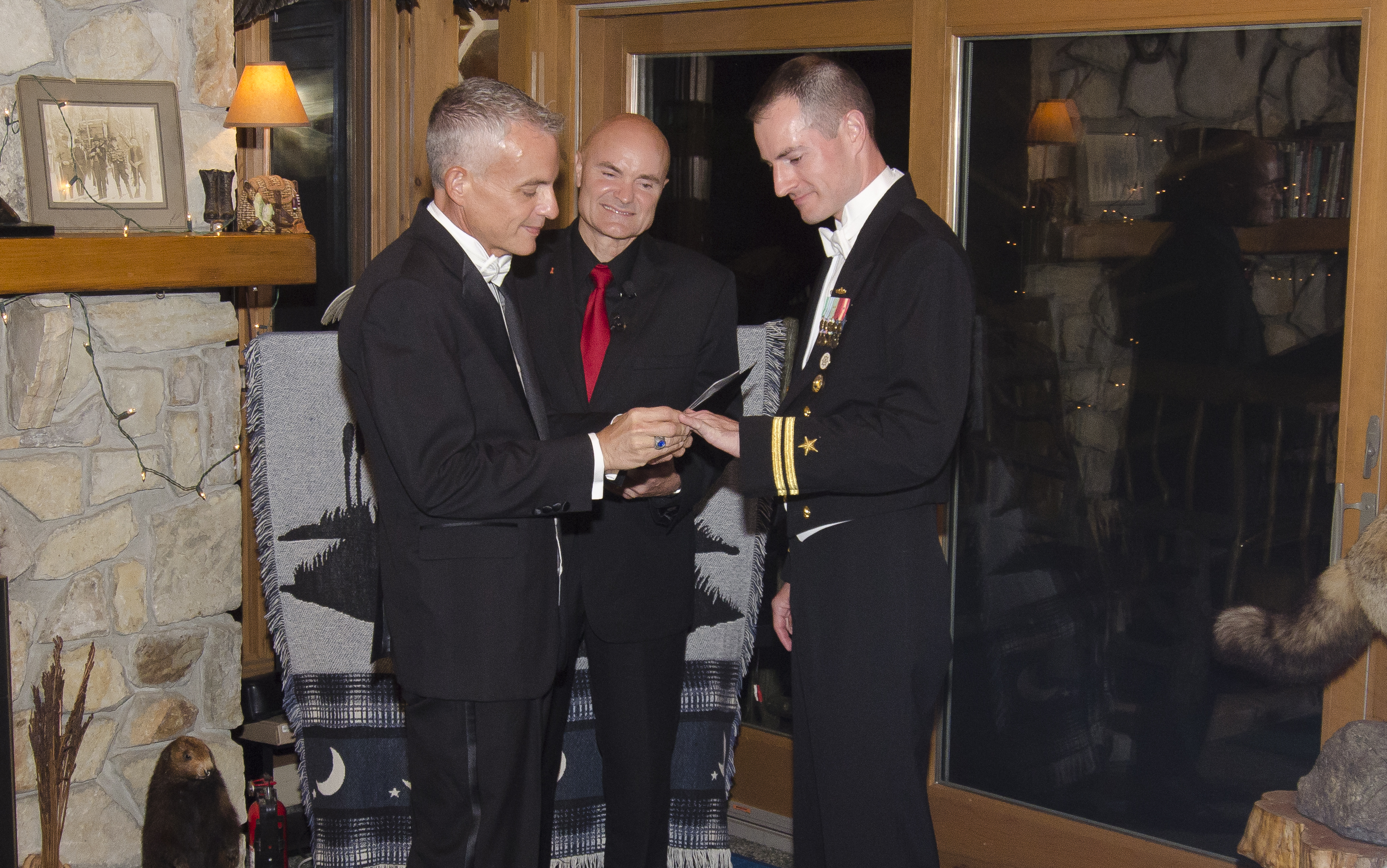
U.S. Navy LT Gary Ross and Dan Swezy marrying in Duxbury on September 19, 2011

=== Passage of legislation in 2009 ===
On January 26, 2006, Representative Mark Larson, a Democrat, introduced draft legislation to grant same-sex couples the right to marry and allow clergy to refuse to perform same-sex marriages if this would violate their religious beliefs. The bill failed in the General Assembly. In July 2007, legislative leaders created a commission to consider "Family Recognition and Protection". Its April 2008 report made no recommendations but detailed the differences between civil unions and marriages, including the terminology and rights and obligations associated with each status.

The Vermont Senate approved same-sex marriage legislation 26–4 on March 23, 2009, and Governor Jim Douglas threatened to veto it. On April 3, the House passed an amended version of the bill 94–52, several votes shy of a veto-proof two-thirds majority. On April 6, the Senate approved the amendments made by the House, and Governor Douglas vetoed the legislation as promised. On April 7, the Senate overrode the veto by a 23–5 vote and the House overrode it 100–49. The law went into effect on September 1, 2009, making Vermont the third U.S. state to legalize same-sex marriages, after Connecticut, Iowa and Massachusetts. California as of that date only recognized same-sex marriages established between June 16 and November 5, 2008, when it was forced to stop issuing marriage licenses to same-sex couples by voter approval of Proposition 8. Vermont was the first state to establish the legal recognition of same-sex marriage by legislation rather than as a result of a court ruling.

April 7, 2009 vote in the Senate
Political affiliation	Voted for	Voted against	Abstained	Absent (Did not vote)
Democratic Party	21: Tim Ashe; Claire Ayer; Susan Bartlett; John Campbell; Bill Carris; Matthew Choate; Ann Cummings; Harold Giard; Robert Hartwell; Jane Kitchel; Sara Kittell; Ginny Lyons; Mark MacDonald; Richard Mazza; Richard McCormack; Hinda Miller; Alice Nikita; Doug Racine; Dick Sears; Peter Shumlin; Jeanette White	1: Robert Starr	–	1: Ed Flanagan
Republican Party	2: Kevin Mullin; Diane Snelling	4: Randy Brock; William Doyle; Vincent Illuzzi; Hull Maynard	–	1: Phil Scott
Total	23	5	0	2
Total	76.7%	16.7%	0.0%	6.7%

April 7, 2009 vote in the House of Representatives
Political affiliation	Voted for	Voted against	Abstained	Absent (Did not vote)
Democratic Party	87: Janet Ancel; Margaret Andrews; Bill Aswad; Charles Bohi; Bill Botzow; Christopher Bray; Margaret Cheney; Alison Clarkson; Jim Condon; Chip Conquest; Sarah Copeland Hanzas; Gale Courcelle; David Deen; Johannah Leddy Donovan; Alice Emmons; Debbie Evans; Michael Fisher; William Frank; Eldred French; Patsy French; Frank Geier; Gary Gilbert; Maxine Grad; Helen Head; Martha Heath; Mary Hooper; Steven Howard; Tim Jerman; Willem Jewett; Mitzi Johnson; Kathleen Keenan; Warren Kitzmiller; Tony Klein; Diane Lanpher; Mark Larson; Joan Lenes; Lucy Leriche; Bill Lippert; Jason Lorber; Terence Macaig; Steven Maier; John Malcolm; Ann Manwaring; Richard Marek; Cynthia Martin; Linda Martin; Jim Masland; Jim McCullough; Virginia Milkey; Alice Miller; Sue Minter; Mark Mitchell; Anne Mook; John Moran; Mike Mrowicki; Floyd Nease; Betty Nuovo; Anne Therea O'Brien; Michael Obuchowski; Scott Orr; Carolyn Partridge; Kathy Pellett; Peter Peltz; Paul Poirier; Ann Pugh; Kesha Ram; John Rodgers; Ernest Shand; David Sharpe; Megan Smith; Shap Smith; Robert South; Kristy Spengler; Tom Stevens; Donna Sweaney; Tess Taylor; George Till; Catherine Toll; Lawrence Townsend; Ira Trombley; Linda Waite-Simpson; Kate Webb; Rachel Weston; Jeff Wilson; Suzi Wizowaty; Jeff Young; John Zenie	7: Kenneth Atkins; Clem Bissonnette; Cynthia Browning; Michel Consejo; Timothy Corcoran II; Mark Higley; Dave Potter	–	1: Albert Audette
Republican Party	6: Anne Donahue; Richard Hube; Patti Komline; Heidi Scheuermann; Richard Westman; Kurt Wright	42: Joe Acinapura; Steven Adams; David Ainsworth; Joseph Baker; Carolyn Whitney Branagan; Patrick Brennan; Bill Canfield; Gregory Clark; John Clerkin; Howard Crawford; Dennis Devereux; Eileen Dickinson; Andrew Donaghy; Peter Fagan; Margaret Flory; Robert Helm; Richard Howrigan; Ronald Hubert; William Johnson; Duncan Kilmartin; Thomas Koch; Joseph Krawczyk Jr.; Leigh Larocque; Richard Lawrence; Robert Lewis; Michael Marcotte; Norman McAllister; Patricia McDonald; Francis McFaun; James McNeil; John Morley; Mary Morrissey; Linda Myers; Patty O'Donnell; Albert Pearce; Janice Peaslee; Peter Perley; Gerald Reis; Brian Savage; Donald Turner; Scott Wheeler; Philip Winters	–	–
Progressive Party	5: Mollie Burke; Susan Davis; Sarah Edwards; Sandy Haas; David Zuckerman	–	–	–
Independent	2: Adam Greshin; Will Stevens	–	–	–
Total	100	49	0	1
Total	66.7%	32.7%	0.0%	0.7%

The first same-sex couple to marry in Vermont were Bill Sullivan (né Slimback) and Bob Sullivan, who exchanged vows at the Moose Meadow Lodge in Waterbury one minute after midnight on September 1, with Justice of the Peace Greg Trulson officiating. Since September 2009, the definition of marriage in Vermont has been the following:

Marriage is the legally recognized union of two people. [15 V.S.A. § 8]

=== Economic impact ===
A comprehensive study from the University of California, Los Angeles in March 2009 concluded that extending marriage to same-sex couples would boost Vermont's economy by over $30.6 million in business activity over three years, which would in turn generate increases in state and local government sales tax and fee revenues by $3.3 million and create approximately 700 new jobs.

=== Demographics and marriage statistics ===
Data from the 2000 U.S. census showed that 1,933 same-sex couples were living in Vermont. By 2005, this had increased to 2,157 couples, likely attributed to same-sex couples' growing willingness to disclose their partnerships on government surveys. Same-sex couples lived in all counties of the state, and constituted 1.3% of coupled households and 0.8% of all households in the state. Most couples lived in Chittenden, Washington and Windham counties, but the counties with the highest percentage of same-sex couples were Orange (1.04% of all county households) and Windham (1.01%). Same-sex partners in Vermont were on average younger than opposite-sex partners, and more likely to be employed. In addition, the median household income of same-sex couples was higher than different-sex couples, but same-sex couples were far less likely to own a home than opposite-sex partners. 20% of same-sex couples in Vermont were raising children under the age of 18, with an estimated 643 children living in households headed by same-sex couples in 2005.

2,779 same-sex couples married in the state of Vermont between September 2009 and June 2013. The 2020 U.S. census showed that there were 2,130 married same-sex couple households (757 male couples and 1,373 female couples) and 1,243 unmarried same-sex couple households in Vermont.

== Public opinion ==
Public opinion for same-sex marriage in Vermont
Poll source	Dates administered	Sample size	Margin of error	Support	Opposition	Do not know / refused
Public Religion Research Institute	February 28 – December 8, 2025	160 adults	?	81%	19%	<0.5%
Public Religion Research Institute	March 13 – December 2, 2024	166 adults	?	86%	14%	<0.5%
Public Religion Research Institute	March 9 – December 7, 2023	157 adults	?	81%	19%	<0.5%
Public Religion Research Institute	March 11 – December 14, 2022	?	?	70%	29%	1%
Public Religion Research Institute	March 8 – November 9, 2021	?	?	77%	23%	<0.5%
Public Religion Research Institute	January 7 – December 20, 2020	115 adults	?	70%	30%	<0.5%
Public Religion Research Institute	April 5 – December 23, 2017	212 adults	?	80%	16%	4%
Public Religion Research Institute	May 18, 2016 – January 10, 2017	313 adults	?	61%	32%	7%
Public Religion Research Institute	April 29, 2015 – January 7, 2016	220 adults	?	69%	21%	10%
Public Religion Research Institute	April 2, 2014 – January 4, 2015	156 adults	?	67%	32%	1%
Castleton Polling Institute	June 3–20, 2013	629 adults	± 4.0%	66%	13%	21%
Public Policy Polling	July 28–31, 2011	1,233 voters	± 2.8%	58%	33%	9%

The July 2011 Public Policy Polling survey found that 58% of Vermont voters thought same-sex marriage should be legal, while 33% thought it should be illegal and 9% were not sure. A separate question on the same survey found that 79% of voters supported the legal recognition of same-sex couples, with 55% supporting same-sex marriage, 24% supporting civil unions but not marriage, 18% favoring no legal recognition, and 3% being undecided.

== See also ==
- LGBT rights in Vermont
- Same-sex marriage in the United States
