= James Gregoire =

American politician

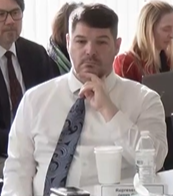
- Gregoire in 2024

Member of the Vermont House of Representatives from the Franklin-6 district
- Incumbent
- Assumed office January 9, 2019
- Preceded by: Daniel Connor

Personal details
- Born: 1974 (age 51–52) St. Albans, Vermont, U. S.
- Party: Republican
- Spouse: Courtney Gregoire (m. 2014)
- Children: 1

James Gregoire (born 1974) is an American politician. He serves as a Republican member for the Franklin-6 district of the Vermont House of Representatives.

== Life and career ==
Gregoire was born in St. Albans, Vermont. He attended Fairfield Center School and Bellows Free Academy.

Gregoire served in the United States Army for five years, and was formerly in the Vermont National Guard.

In 2019, Gregoire was elected to represent the Franklin-6 district of the Vermont House of Representatives, succeeding Daniel Connor. He defeated Kelly Cummings in the general election.
