= Alison H. Clarkson =

American politician

Alison Clarkson
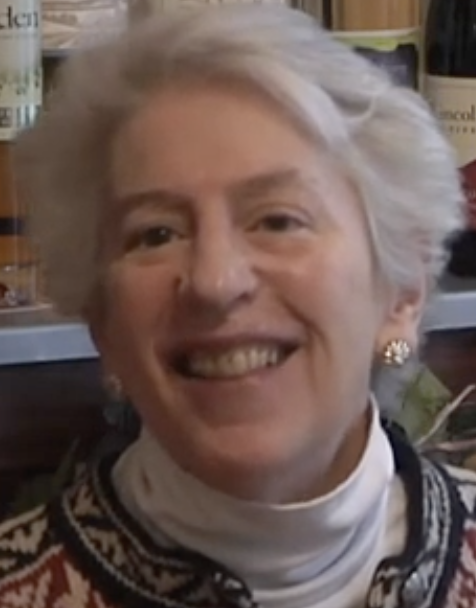

Majority Leader of the Vermont Senate
- In office January 6, 2021 – January 8, 2025
- Preceded by: Becca Balint
- Succeeded by: Kesha Ram Hinsdale

Member of the Vermont Senate from the Windsor district
- Incumbent
- Assumed office January 4, 2017 Serving with Rebecca White and Richard McCormack
- Preceded by: John Campbell

Member of the Vermont House of Representatives from the Windsor 5th district
- In office January 5, 2005 – January 4, 2017
- Preceded by: Jack Anderson
- Succeeded by: Charles Kimbell

Personal details
- Born: Alison Hudnut Clarkson; April 26, 1955 (age 71) Buffalo, New York, U.S.
- Party: Democratic
- Spouse: Oliver Ramsdell Goodenough
- Children: 2
- Education: Harvard University (BA)

Alison Hudnut Clarkson (born April 26, 1955) is an American theatrical producer and politician. She served as the majority leader of the Vermont Senate from 2021 to 2025, representing the Windsor district as a member of the Democratic Party. Before entering the state senate, she served in the Vermont House of Representatives from the Windsor 5th district from 2005 to 2017.

Clarkson was born in Buffalo, New York, and educated at The Park School of Buffalo and Harvard University. She worked as a theatrical producer for productions which included The Potsdam Quartet and A. R. Gurney's The Middle Ages and served on the New York Theatre Workshop's board of directors.

She was elected to the state house in the 2004 election after Representative Jack Anderson retired. She continued to serve in the state house until her election to the state senate in the 2016 election following the retirement of Senator John F. Campbell. Clarkson was selected to replace Becca Balint as Majority Leader in the state senate in 2020.

== Early life and education ==
Alison Hudnut Clarkson was born in Buffalo, New York, on April 26, 1955, to William Melbourne Elliott Clarkson, who later served as the Executive Deputy Commissioner of Commerce of the State of New York. She graduated from The Park School of Buffalo, which she later served on its board of trustees, and from Harvard University, attending Radcliffe College, with a Bachelor of Arts degree in 1977. Clarkson married Oliver Ramsdell Goodenough, with whom she had two children, on January 12, 1985, and moved to Vermont in 1992.

Clarkson was a theatrical producer and served on the board of directors for the New York Theatre Workshop and Vermont Arts Council board of trustees; the first production she managed was The Potsdam Quartet in 1982, and she produced A. R. Gurney's The Middle Ages in 1983.

== Career ==
=== Vermont House of Representatives ===
Jack Anderson, an independent member of the Vermont House of Representatives, retired during the 2004 election. She won the Democratic nomination and defeated Republican nominee Preston J. Bristow Jr. in the general election. She won reelection in the 2006, 2010, 2012, and 2014 elections without opposition. She defeated Republican nominee Geoffrey Peterson, whose name had appeared on the ballot despite him dropping out and who announced in October that he was not in the race, in the 2008 election.

During her tenure in the state house she served on the Judicial Retention committee. She served as the clerk of the Ways and Means committee, and vice-chair and chair of the Legislative Council.

=== Vermont Senate ===
John F. Campbell, the President pro tempore of the Vermont Senate, retired during the 2016 election. Clarkson announced her campaign for a seat in the Vermont Senate on April 25, 2016, at a rally attended by Rebecca White, Gabrielle Lucke, and Ernie Shand. She won the Democratic nomination alongside Alice Nitka and Richard McCormack despite Campbell having endorsed Conor Kennedy in the primary and she placed first out of seven candidates in the general election. She placed first out of all candidates in the 2018 and 2020 elections.

During her tenure in the state senate she served on the Judicial Rules, Joint Rules, and Rules committees. She served as the clerk of the Government Operations committee, and vice-chair of the Economic Development, Housing and General Affairs. The Democratic caucus voted unanimously in 2020, to have Clarkson succeed Becca Balint as the Majority Leader after Senator Brian Campion dropped out of contention.

== Political positions ==
In 2007, the state house voted 82 to 63, with Clarkson voting in favor, against legislation to allow doctors to perform assisted suicide on terminally ill patients. The state house voted 95 to 52, with Clarkson in favor, in favor of legalizing same-sex marriage in 2009, and she later voted in favor of the successful overturning of Governor Jim Douglas' veto of the legislation. The Vermont Conservation Voters gave her a lifetime score of 96%. Clarkson and Senator McCormack sponsored legislation in 2017, which created a day in honor of abolitionist John Brown, following the white supremacist Unite the Right rally in Charlottesville, Virginia.

== Electoral history ==
=== Vermont Hose of Representatives ===
Alison H. Clarkson electoral history - VT House

2004 Vermont House of Representatives Windsor 5th district election
Primary election
Party	Candidate	Votes	%
Democratic	Alison H. Clarkson	280	99.64%
Write-in		1	0.36%
Total votes		281	100.00%
General election
Democratic	Alison H. Clarkson	1,500	63.24%
Republican	Preston J. Bristow Jr.	871	36.72%
Write-in		1	0.04%
Total votes		2,372	100.00%

2006 Vermont House of Representatives Windsor 5th district election
Primary election
Party	Candidate	Votes	%
Democratic	Alison H. Clarkson (incumbent)	491	99.80%
Write-in		1	0.20%
Total votes		492	100.00%
General election
Democratic	Alison H. Clarkson (incumbent)	1,678	89.92%
Write-in		188	10.08%
Total votes		1,866	100.00%

2008 Vermont House of Representatives Windsor 5th district election
Primary election
Party	Candidate	Votes	%
Democratic	Alison H. Clarkson (incumbent)	189	98.95%
Write-in		2	1.05%
Total votes		191	100.00%
General election
Democratic	Alison H. Clarkson (incumbent)	1,899	80.95%
Republican	Geoffrey Peterson	431	18.37%
Write-in		16	0.68%
Total votes		2,346	100.00%

2010 Vermont House of Representatives Windsor 5th district election
Primary election
Party	Candidate	Votes	%
Democratic	Alison H. Clarkson (incumbent)	682	99.27%
Write-in		5	0.73%
Total votes		687	100.00%
	Blank and spoiled	73	
General election
Democratic	Alison H. Clarkson (incumbent)	1,575	97.46%
Write-in		41	2.54%
Total votes		1,616	100.00%
	Blank and spoiled	273	

2012 Vermont House of Representatives Windsor 5th district election
Primary election
Party	Candidate	Votes	%
Democratic	Alison H. Clarkson (incumbent)	305	100.00%
Total votes		305	100.00%
	Blank and spoiled	42	
General election
Democratic	Alison H. Clarkson (incumbent)	2,247	98.77%
Write-in		28	1.23%
Total votes		2,275	100.00%
	Blank and spoiled	342	

2014 Vermont House of Representatives Windsor 5th district election
Primary election
Party	Candidate	Votes	%
Democratic	Alison H. Clarkson (incumbent)	107	98.17%
Write-in		2	1.83%
Total votes		109	100.00%
	Blank and spoiled	15	
General election
Democratic	Alison H. Clarkson (incumbent)	1,320	100.00%
Total votes		1,320	100.00%

=== Vermont Senate ===
Alison H. Clarkson electoral history - VT Senate

2016 Vermont Senate Windsor district election
Primary election
Party	Candidate	Votes	%
Democratic	Richard McCormack (incumbent)	5,381	28.68%
Democratic	Alison H. Clarkson	5,145	27.43%
Democratic	Alice Nitka (incumbent)	4,448	23.71%
Democratic	Conor Kennedy	3,720	19.83%
Write-in		65	0.35%
Total votes		18,759	100.00%
	Blank and spoiled	7,731	
General election
Democratic	Alison H. Clarkson	15,436	20.72%
Democratic	Alice Nitka (incumbent)	14,430	19.37%
Progressive	Richard McCormack (incumbent)		
Democratic	Richard McCormack (incumbent)		
Total	Richard McCormack (incumbent)	13,905	18.66%
Republican	Mark Donka	9,836	13.20%
Republican	Randy A. Gray	8,148	10.94%
Republican	Jack Williams	7,460	10.01%
Independent	Scott D. Woodward	5,198	6.98%
Write-in		87	0.12%
Total votes		74,500	100.00%
	Blank and spoiled	21,764	

2018 Vermont Senate Windsor district election
Primary election
Party	Candidate	Votes	%
Democratic	Alison H. Clarkson (incumbent)	4,699	33.72%
Democratic	Richard McCormack (incumbent)	4,621	33.16%
Democratic	Alice Nitka (incumbent)	4,511	32.37%
Write-in		103	0.74%
Total votes		13,934	100.00%
	Blank and spoiled	5,440	
General election
Democratic	Alison H. Clarkson	15,091	23.03%
Democratic	Alice Nitka (incumbent)	14,276	21.78%
Progressive	Richard McCormack (incumbent)		
Democratic	Richard McCormack (incumbent)		
Total	Richard McCormack (incumbent)	13,591	20.74%
Republican	Randy A. Gray	7,183	10.96%
Republican	Wayne D. Townsend	6,882	10.50%
Republican	Jack Williams	6,389	9.75%
Independent	Mason Wade	2,055	3.14%
Write-in		65	0.10%
Total votes		65,532	100.00%
	Blank and spoiled	15,537	

2020 Vermont Senate Windsor district election
Primary election
Party	Candidate	Votes	%
Democratic	Alison H. Clarkson (incumbent)	8,164	33.69%
Democratic	Richard McCormack (incumbent)	8,030	33.13%
Democratic	Alice Nitka (incumbent)	7,883	32.53%
Write-in		158	0.65%
Total votes		24,235	100.00%
	Blank and spoiled	8,471	
General election
Democratic	Alison H. Clarkson (incumbent)	19,084	23.33%
Democratic	Richard McCormack (incumbent)	17,477	21.36%
Democratic	Alice Nitka (incumbent)		
Republican	Alice Nitka (incumbent)		
Total	Alice Nitka (incumbent)	16,726	20.45%
Republican	Jack Williams	9,702	11.86%
Republican	Michael Jasinski Sr.	9,632	11.77%
Independent	Keith Stern	4,605	5.63%
Independent	Doug Wilberding	2,855	3.49%
Independent	Mason Wade	1,471	1.80%
Write-in		251	0.31%
Total votes		81,803	100.00%
	Blank and spoiled	28,285	

2022 Vermont Senate Windsor district election
Primary election
Party	Candidate	Votes	%
Democratic	Rebecca White	7,545	31.36%
Democratic	Alison H. Clarkson (incumbent)	7,528	31.29%
Democratic	Richard McCormack (incumbent)	6,701	27.85%
Democratic	Christopher Morrow	2,211	9.19%
Write-in		74	0.31%
Total votes		24,059	100.00%
	Blank and spoiled	7,480	
General election
Democratic	Alison H. Clarkson (incumbent)	17,042	23.36%
Democratic	Rebecca White	16,740	22.95%
Democratic	Richard McCormack (incumbent)	16,539	22.67%
Republican	Alice Flanders	7,737	10.61%
Republican	Dana Colson, Jr.	7,586	10.40%
Republican	Bill T. Huff	7,174	9.83%
Write-in		133	0.18%
Total votes		72,951	100.00%
	Blank and spoiled	13,053	

2024 Vermont Senate Windsor district election
Primary election
Party	Candidate	Votes	%
Democratic	Rebecca White (incumbent)	4,226	31.58%
Democratic	Alison H. Clarkson (incumbent)	4,123	30.81%
Democratic	Joe Major	3,268	24.41%
Democratic	Justin Tuthill	877	6.55%
Democratic	Marc Nemeth	816	6.10%
Write-in		74	0.55%
Total votes		13,384	100.00%
	Blank and spoiled	2,579	
General election
Democratic	Rebecca White (incumbent)	17,930	20.04%
Democratic	Alison H. Clarkson (incumbent)	17,864	19.96%
Democratic	Joe Major	16,792	18.76%
Republican	Andrea Murray	12,318	13.76%
Republican	Jack Williams	10,844	12.12%
Republican	Jonathan Gleason	10,720	11.98%
Independent	Marc Nemeth	2,903	0.32%
Write-in		118	0.13%
Total votes		89,489	100.00%
	Blank and spoiled	18,874	

Vermont Senate
Preceded by Becca Balint	Majority Leader of the Vermont Senate; 2021–2025	Succeeded by Kesha Ram Hinsdale
