= Stephen Carr (disambiguation) =

Stephen, Steve or Steven Carr may refer to:

- Stephen Carr (born 1976), Irish footballer
- Stephen Carr (figure skater) (born 1966), Irish figure skater
- Stephen Carr (politician), American politician
- Steve Carr (born 1965), American director and producer
- Steve Carr (artist) (born 1976), New Zealand artist
- Steven E. Carr, American attorney, entrepreneur, and social activist
