= Senator Parent =

Senator Parent may refer to:

- Corey Parent (born 1990), Vermont State Senate
- Elena Parent (born 1975), Georgia State Senate
