= Robert Norris (Vermont politician) =

American politician from Vermont

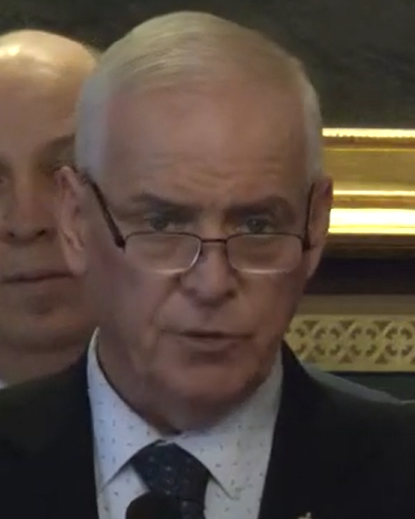
- Norris in 2025

Member of the Vermont Senate from the Franklin district
- Incumbent
- Assumed office January 4, 2023 Serving with Randy Brock
- Preceded by: Corey Parent

Member of the Vermont House of Representatives from the Franklin-4 district
- In office January 6, 2021 – January 4, 2023 Serving with Matthew Walker
- Preceded by: Marianna Gamache
- Succeeded by: Thomas Oliver

Personal details
- Party: Republican
- Spouse: Elizabeth A. Callan
- Education: Community College of Vermont

Robert Norris is an American politician from the state of Vermont who currently serves as a member of the Vermont House of Representatives from the Franklin-4 district. He is running for the Vermont Senate to represent the Franklin County district. He previously served as the sheriff of Franklin County.
