= Senator Clarkson =

Senator Clarkson may refer to:

- Alison H. Clarkson (born 1955), Vermont State Senate
- Matthew Clarkson (1758–1825), New York State Senate
