= Frank Davis (New Hampshire politician) =

American politician

Member of New Hampshire House of Representatives for Merrimack 20
- In office 2012–2014

Member of New Hampshire House of Representatives for Merrimack 7
- In office 2006–2010

Member of New Hampshire House of Representatives for Merrimack 7
- In office 1998–2004

Personal details
- Party: Independent; Democratic

Frank Davis is an American politician. He represented Merrimack County on the New Hampshire House of Representatives until 2014.

He was an independent candidate for Orleans-1 District in the 2018 Vermont House of Representatives election.
