= Rachael Fields =

American politician (born 1980)

Member of the Vermont House of Representatives from the Bennington 2-1 district
- In office January 7, 2015 – January 8, 2019 Serving with Timothy Corcoran II
- Preceded by: Brian Campion
- Succeeded by: Chris Bates

Personal details
- Born: March 19, 1980 (age 46) Tempe, Arizona, U.S.
- Party: Democratic
- Spouse: Andrew Fields

Rachael D. Fields (born March 19, 1980) is an American politician. A member of the Democratic Party, she has served in the Vermont House of Representatives since being first elected in 2014.

== Electoral history ==
Date	Election	Candidate	Party	Votes	%
Vermont House of Representatives, Bennington 2-1 district
Nov 4, 2014	General	Timothy R. Corcoran, II	Democratic	1,632	57.59
Nov 4, 2014	General	Rachael Fields	Democratic	1,156	40.79
Nov 4, 2014	General	Write-Ins		46	1.62
Nov 4, 2014	General	Brian Campion ran for state senate; seat stayed Democratic			
Nov 8, 2016	General	Timothy R. Corcoran, II	Democratic	2,316	54.53
Nov 8, 2016	General	Rachael Fields	Democratic	1,870	44.03
Nov 8, 2016	General	Write-Ins		61	1.44

Vermont House of Representatives
Preceded by Brian Campion	Vermont Representative from the Bennington 2-1 District; 2015–present Served alongside: Timothy Corcoran II	Succeeded by Incumbent
