= Jana Brown =

American politician

Member of the Vermont House of Representatives from the Chittenden-1 district
- Incumbent
- Assumed office January 6, 2021
- Preceded by: Marcia Gardner

Personal details
- Party: Democratic
- Education: Ohio Wesleyan University (BA); Ohio State University (JD)

Jana Brown is an American attorney and politician serving as a member of the Vermont House of Representatives for the Chittenden-1 district. Elected in November 2020, she assumed office on January 6, 2021.

== Early life and education ==
Brown was raised in Fair Haven, Vermont. She earned a Bachelor of Arts degree in literature and Spanish from Ohio Wesleyan University and a Juris Doctor from the Ohio State University Moritz College of Law.

== Career ==
Brown began her career as an attorney in the Ohio Attorney General's Office. She then returned to Vermont, where she worked in the Civil Litigation Division of the Vermont Attorney General's Office. Since 2014, she has been the executive director of the Children’s Literacy Foundation. Brown was elected to the Vermont House of Representatives in November 2020 and assumed office on January 6, 2021.
