= Gary Viens =

American politician and member of the Vermont State House of Representatives

Member of the Vermont House of Representatives from the Orleans-2 District
- In office 2014–2019

Personal details
- Born: Newport, Vermont
- Party: Republican

Gary Viens is an American politician who served in the Vermont House of Representatives from 2014 to 2019.
