= Ben Joseph =

American politician (born 1942)

Member of the Vermont House of Representatives from the Grand Isle-Chittenden district
- Incumbent
- Assumed office 2017

Personal details
- Born: July 17, 1942 (age 84) Fresno, California, U.S.
- Party: Democratic
- Education: University of Pennsylvania Law School
- Profession: judge, lawyer

Ben W. Joseph (born July 17, 1942) is an American politician in the state of Vermont. He is a member of the Vermont House of Representatives, sitting as a Democrat from the Grand Isle-Chittenden district, having been first elected in 2016. He was previously a judge on the Vermont Superior Court from 1998 to 2010.
