= Michael Hebert =

American politician and member of the Vermont State House of Representatives

Member of the Vermont House of Representatives from the Windham-1 district
- In office 2011–2019
- Succeeded by: Sara Coffey

Personal details
- Born: Holyoke, MA
- Party: Republican
- Children: 2
- Education: STCC (AS)

Michael Hebert is an American politician who served in the Vermont House of Representatives from 2011 to 2019.
