= Sara Coffey =

American politician and member of the Vermont State House of Representatives

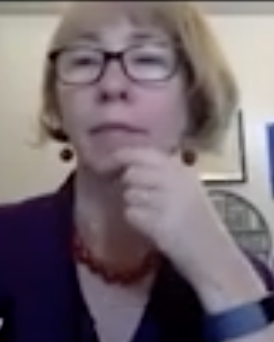

Member of the Vermont House of Representatives from the Windham 1 district
- Incumbent
- Assumed office January 9, 2019
- Preceded by: Michael Hebert
- Succeeded by: Zon Eastes (elect)

Personal details
- Born: Massachusetts, U.S.
- Party: Democratic
- Children: 2
- Education: Marlboro College; School for International Training (BA); New York University (MA)

Sara Coffey is an American politician who has served in the Vermont House of Representatives since 2019.
