= Marcia Gardner =

American politician

Member of the Vermont House of Representatives from the Chittenden-1 district
- In office 2017–2021
- Succeeded by: Jana Brown

Personal details
- Born: Naval Station Great Lakes, North Chicago, Illinois, U.S.
- Party: Democratic
- Children: 4
- Education: University of Vermont (BA) Saint Michael’s College (MSA)

Marcia Gardner is an American politician who served as a member of the Vermont House of Representatives for the Chittenden 1 district from 2017 to 2021.
