= Douglas Gage =

American politician from Vermont

Member of the Vermont House of Representatives from the Rutland 5-4 District district
- In office 2013–2019
- Succeeded by: William Notte

Personal details
- Born: Reading, Pennsylvania
- Party: Republican

Douglas A. Gage is an American politician from Vermont. He was a Republican member of the Vermont House of Representatives.
