= Robert Frenier =

American politician and member of the Vermont State House of Representatives

Member of the Vermont House of Representatives from the Orange-1 District
- In office 2017–2019

Personal details
- Born: Bedford, Massachusetts, U.S.
- Party: Republican
- Education: Tufts University (BA)

Robert Frenier is an American politician who served in the Vermont House of Representatives from 2017 to 2019. He is an Eagle Scout and served in the Marines, He is a former news editor of the Bedford Minuteman newspaper.
