= Samuel Young (Vermont politician) =

American politician from Vermont

Member of the Vermont House of Representatives from the Orleans-Caledonia District district
- In office 2011 – January 6, 2021
- Succeeded by: Katherine Sims

Personal details
- Party: Democratic
- Education: Prescott College; University of Vermont

Samuel (Sam) R. Young is an American politician from Vermont. He was a Democratic member of the Vermont House of Representatives.

Young was a member of the board of trustees of the University of Vermont.
