= Patti Lewis =

American politician from Vermont

Member of the Vermont House of Representatives from the Washington 1 district
- In office 2011–2019
- Succeeded by: Kenneth Goslant

Personal details
- Born: Montpelier, Vermont
- Party: Republican

Patti Lewis is an American politician from Vermont. She was a Republican member of the Vermont House of Representatives for the Washington 1 District from 2011 to 2019.

Lewis is town clerk of Fayston, Vermont.
