= Edward Read (politician) =

American politician from Vermont

Member of the Vermont House of Representatives from the Washington 7 district
- In office 2017 – January 9, 2019
- Preceded by: Adam Greshin
- Succeeded by: Kari Dolan

Personal details
- Born: Fayston, Vermont
- Party: Independent

Edward (Ed) Read is an American politician from Vermont. He was an independent member of the Vermont House of Representatives for the Washington 7 District from 2011 to 2019.

== Early life ==
Read was born in Fayston, Vermont.

== Career ==
Governor Phil Scott has appointed Ed Read to replace Adam Greshin in the Vermont House of Representatives.
