= Fred Baser =

American politician

Member of the Vermont House of Representatives from the Addison-4 district
- Incumbent
- Assumed office January 7, 2015
- Preceded by: Michael Fisher

Personal details
- Born: November 4, 1947 (age 78) Bristol, Vermont, U.S.
- Party: Republican
- Education: Colgate University

Fred K. Baser (born November 4, 1947) is an American Republican politician. Since 2015 he serves as member of the Vermont House of Representatives from the Addison-4 district.
