= William Notte =

American politician from Vermont

Member of the Vermont House of Representatives from the Rutland-7 District district
- In office January 4, 2023 – January 8, 2025
- Preceded by: Doug Gage
- Succeeded by: Chris Keyser

Personal details
- Party: Democratic
- Education: Castleton State College

William Notte is an American politician from Vermont. He was a Democratic member of the Vermont House of Representatives for the Rutland-7 District from 2023 to 2025.
