= Gary Nolan (politician) =

American politician and member of the Vermont State House of Representatives

Member of the Vermont House of Representatives from the Lamoille-Washington district
- In office 2017–2019
- Succeeded by: Avram Patt

Personal details
- Born: Jeffersonville, Vermont, U.S.
- Party: Republican
- Children: 3

Gary Nolan is an American politician who served in the Vermont House of Representatives from 2017 to 2019.
