= Betsy Dunn =

American politician and member of the Vermont State House of Representatives

Member of the Vermont House of Representatives from the Chittenden 8-1 district
- In office 2017–2019

Personal details
- Born: Metuchen, New Jersey
- Party: Democratic

Elizabeth "Betsy" Dunn is an American politician who served in the Vermont House of Representatives from 2017 to 2019.
