= Maureen Dakin =

American politician and member of the Vermont State House of Representatives

Member of the Vermont House of Representatives from the Chittenden 7-2 district
- In office 2015–2019

Personal details
- Born: Proctor, Vermont, U.S.
- Party: Democratic
- Children: 2
- Education: University of Vermont (BA)

Maureen Pietryka Dakin is an American politician who served in the Vermont House of Representatives. She was the Representative for the Chittenden-9-2 district from 2015 to 2019 and Representative for the Chittenden-7-2 district from 1996 to 2004.
