= Paul Belaski =

American politician and member of the Vermont State House of Representatives

Member of the Vermont House of Representatives from the Windsor-1 District
- In office 2017–2019

Personal details
- Born: Bellows Falls, Vermont, U.S.
- Party: Democratic
- Education: University of Pennsylvania (BA) Harvard University (MA)

Paul Belaski is an American politician who served in the Vermont House of Representatives from 2017 to 2019.
