= Corey Parent =

American politician

Corey Parent (born July 8, 1990) is a former member of the Vermont Senate. A Republican, he represented St. Albans City and Southeastern St. Albans Town in the Vermont House of Representatives from 2015 to 2019 and was first elected to the Vermont State Senate in 2018, he won reelection in 2020. He did not seek reelection in 2022.

== Early life and education ==
Parent was born in St. Albans, Vermont to Terry and Carrie Parent. Parent attended Bellows Free Academy where he graduated in 2008, and went on to receive a Bachelor of Arts degree in Economics and Government from St. Lawrence University in Canton, New York in 2012.

While at St. Lawrence, Parent was active in the Student Government serving two semesters in the Senate before being elected president during his sophomore year. He was also one of twenty-nine founding fathers to bring the Beta Zeta chapter of Beta Theta Pi fraternity back onto campus in the fall of 2009. Parent graduated magna cum laude and was inducted in Phi Beta Kappa in the spring of 2012.

Following his graduation, Parent worked briefly in Municipal Finance in New York City, before moving back to St. Albans and working as a Business and Process Improvement Analyst for the University of Vermont Medical Center. Corey is now a business Client Adviser for Hickok & Boardman Insurance in St. Albans, Vermont.

== Political career ==
On March 10, 2014, Parent announced his candidacy for the Vermont House of Representatives, seeking one of two seats in the Franklin 3-1 district. On November 4, 2014, Parent received 1,348 votes which made him the top vote getter. Kathy Keenan was also reelected with 981 votes. Incumbent Mike McCarthy was defeated with 923 votes and Claude Bouchard came in fourth with 742 votes.

=== Vermont House of Representatives ===
Parent was sworn in on January 7, 2015. He served on the House Commerce and Economic Development Committee.

In May 2015, Parent was one of eight State Legislators from across the United States who was selected to participate in the Canadian Embassy's Rising State Leader Program. They spent a week in Canada between Toronto, Montreal, and Halifax.

=== Vermont Senate ===
In 2018, Parent was a candidate to represent Franklin County in the Vermont State Senate. In the primary election, Parent won one of the Republican nominations in the two-member at-large district. In the November general election, he and incumbent Republican Randy Brock were elected. On 15 May 2022, Parent stated via Twitter that he "...will not be seeking another term in the VT Senate...". He did not elaborate further.

== Personal life ==
Parent is active member of the St. Albans community, where he has been a youth football and hockey coach. Corey is a member of the board of directors for both the Franklin County Home Health Agency and the Samaritan House. He also serves at Treasurer of the St. Albans Amateur Skating Association.

Vermont House of Representatives
Preceded by Mike McCarthy	Member of the Vermont House of Representatives from the Franklin County 3-1 district 2015–2019; Served alongside: Kathleen Keenan	Succeeded by Mike McCarthy; Casey J. Toof
Vermont Senate
Preceded by Carolyn Whitney Branagan	Member of the Vermont Senate from the Franklin County district 2019–2023; Served alongside: Randy Brock	Succeeded by Robert Norris
