= Constance Quimby =

American politician and member of the Vermont State House of Representatives

Member of the Vermont House of Representatives from the Essex-Caladonia district
- In office January 9, 2013 – January 6, 2021

Personal details
- Born: Essex County, Vermont
- Party: Republican
- Children: 4

Constance (Connie) Quimby is an American politician who served in the Vermont House of Representatives from 2013 to 2021.
