= Rebecca White (American politician) =

American politician

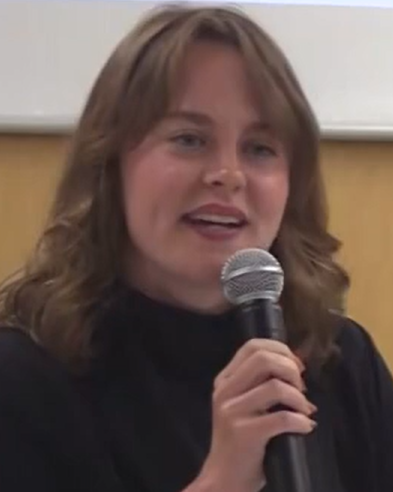
- White in 2024

Member of the Vermont Senate from the Windsor District
- Incumbent
- Assumed office January 4, 2023
- Preceded by: Alice Nitka

Member of the Vermont House of Representatives from the Windsor 4-2 District
- In office January 9, 2019 – January 4, 2023
- Preceded by: Gabrielle Lucke
- Succeeded by: District eliminated

Personal details
- Party: Democratic
- Education: University of Vermont

Rebecca Elizabeth White is an American politician who has served in the Vermont Senate and the Vermont House of Representatives.

== Early life and education ==
Rebecca Elizabeth White grew up in the village of Wilder, Vermont, and graduated from Hartford High School. She also has a Bachelor of Arts in history from the University of Vermont.

== Career ==
She began her career as an organizer for a solar company, and then a community engagement manager for Efficiency Vermont.

She ran for a seat on the Hartford select board at the age of 20, where she served for two terms.

=== Vermont House of Representatives ===
White was elected to the Vermont House of Representatives in 2018. She served on the House Committee on Transportation.

=== Vermont Senate ===
On April 4, 2022, White announced her candidacy for one of the three Windsor Senate seats. She won in the November election. She serves as a co-chair for the Climate Solutions Caucus and the Future's Caucus.

White was an associate with Palestinian activist Mohsen Mahdawi, whom she had known for around seven years until his arrest in April 2025. Earlier in the month, Mahdawi had received an email from USCIS stating that he had an interview scheduled to obtain his US citizenship. Because the ordinary timeline for the interview would have placed it in December or January, Mahdawi suspected it might be a trap and contacted White, who cautioned Mahdawi against going. He also included White in a Signal group chat titled “Just in case — Mohsen” to communicate with his close friends if he was arrested. She later condemned his arrest, stating, “I had told constituents, ‘You are safe here.’ And I can no longer say that.”
