= Bill Canfield =

American politician

William Canfield is an American politician. He represents the Rutland-10 district in the Vermont House of Representatives.
