= Mark Higley =

American politician

Member of the Vermont House of Representatives from the Orleans-Lamoille District district
- Incumbent
- Assumed office January 4, 2009

Personal details
- Born: Brattleboro, Vermont
- Party: Republican

Mark Higley is an American politician from Vermont. He has been a Republican member of the Vermont House of Representatives for the Orleans-Lamoille District since 2009.

Higley was born in Brattleboro, Vermont.
