= Mary Hooper (politician) =

American politician and civic leader

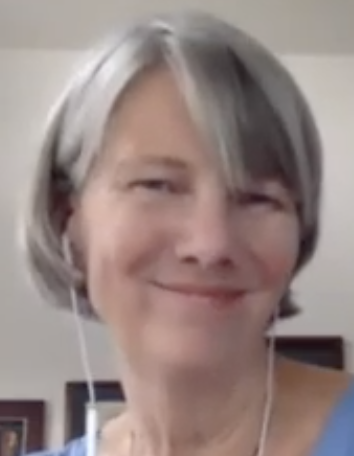
Hooper in 2020

Mary S. Hooper (born Heidelberg, Germany) is an American politician and civic leader from the state of Vermont. She was a member of the Vermont House of Representatives from 2009 to 2023, representing the Washington-5 Representative District.

She served four 2-year terms as mayor of Montpelier, the capital city of Vermont.

Hooper was first elected mayor in 2004 and was re-elected in 2006, 2008, and 2010. Although Montpelier's municipal elections are non-partisan, Hooper was elected as a Democrat to the Vermont state legislature in 2008. She was reelected every two years through 2020, and was not a candidate for reelection in 2022.

Hooper did not run for reelection as Mayor in 2012 and was succeeded by John Hollar.
