= Mollie Burke =

American politician

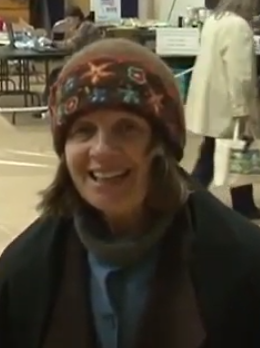

Member of the Vermont House of Representatives
- Incumbent
- Assumed office 2009
- Preceded by: Daryl Pillsbury (Windham-2-2)
- Constituency: Windham-3-2 (2009-2013); Windham-2-2 (2013-2023); Windham-8 (2023-present)

Personal details
- Party: Vermont Progressive
- Other political affiliations: Democratic
- Spouse: Peter Gould
- Children: 3
- Education: Marymount Manhattan College (BA); Goddard College (MFA)

Mollie S. Burke is an American politician who serves in the Vermont House of Representatives from the Windham-8 district as a member of the Vermont Progressive Party. Prior to her tenure in the state house she was active in local politics in Brattleboro, Vermont.

== Early life and education ==
Mollie S. Burke was raised in Buffalo, New York. She graduated from Marymount Manhattan College with a Bachelor of Arts degree in political science and graduated from Goddard College with a Master of Fine Arts degree. She moved to Vermont in 1970. She married Peter Gould, with whom she had three children.

== Career ==
=== Local politics ===
Burke was elected as one of thirteen town meeting representatives from the 3rd district in Brattleboro, Vermont, in 1990. She has served as a town meeting representative since 1990.

=== Vermont House of Representatives ===
==== Elections ====
Representative Daryl Pillsbury, an independent, did not seek reelection to the Vermont House of Representatives from the Windham-3-2 district in the 2008 election. Burke ran with the Vermont Progressive and Democratic nominations and won in the general election without opposition. Her election made her the second member of the Progressive Party to represent Brattleboro after Representative Sarah Edwards.

She was reelected in the 2010 elections without opposition. She was redistricted into the Windham-2-2 district and won reelection without opposition in the 2012, 2014, 2018, and 2020 elections. She defeated independent candidate Adam Salviani in the 2016 election.

==== Tenure ====
Burke supported Peter Shumlin during the 2010 gubernatorial election and called upon members of the Vermont Progressive Party to support Shumlin. During the 2010 election she endorsed Doug Hoffer for Auditor. During the 2016 Democratic presidential primaries she supported Bernie Sanders for the Democratic presidential nomination.

During her tenure in the state house she served on the Transportation committee. In 2017, a recount was conducted in the Orange-1 district and Burke was one of the members of the twenty-three member committee that oversaw the recount.

== Political positions ==
The state house voted 95 to 52, with Burke in favor, in favor of legislation which would allow for same-sex marriage in Vermont and the state house later voted 100 to 49, with Burke in favor, of overturning Governor Jim Douglas' veto of the legislation.

== Electoral history ==
Mollie Burke electoral history

2008 Vermont House of Representatives Windham-3-2 district election
Party	Candidate	Votes	%
Progressive	Mollie Burke		
Democratic	Mollie Burke		
Total	Mollie Burke	1,683	99.18%
Write-in		14	0.82%
Total votes		1,697	100.00%

2010 Vermont House of Representatives Windham-3-2 district Democratic primary
Party	Candidate	Votes	%
Democratic	Mollie Burke (incumbent)	539	99.26%
Write-in		4	0.74%
Total votes		543	100.00%
	Blank	67	

2010 Vermont House of Representatives Windham-3-2 district election
Party	Candidate	Votes	%	±%
Progressive	Mollie Burke (incumbent)			
Democratic	Mollie Burke (incumbent)			
Total	Mollie Burke (incumbent)	1,112	99.11%	-0.07%
Write-in		10	0.89%	+0.07%
Total votes		1,122	100.00%	
	Blank	206		

2012 Vermont House of Representatives Windham-2-2 district Democratic primary
Party	Candidate	Votes	%	±%
Democratic	Mollie Burke (incumbent)	314	99.05%	−0.21%
Write-in		3	0.95%	+0.21%
Total votes		317	100.00%	
	Blank	43		

2012 Vermont House of Representatives Windham-2-2 district election
Party	Candidate	Votes	%	±%
Progressive	Mollie Burke (incumbent)			
Democratic	Mollie Burke (incumbent)			
Total	Mollie Burke (incumbent)	1,561	99.30%	+0.19%
Write-in		11	0.70%	-0.19%
Total votes		1,572	100.00%	
	Blank	262		

2014 Vermont House of Representatives Windham-2-2 district Democratic primary
Party	Candidate	Votes	%	±%
Democratic	Mollie Burke (incumbent)	295	99.66%	+0.61%
Write-in		1	0.34%	-0.61%
Total votes		296	100.00%	
	Blank	47		

2014 Vermont House of Representatives Windham-2-2 district election
Party	Candidate	Votes	%	±%
Progressive	Mollie Burke (incumbent)			
Democratic	Mollie Burke (incumbent)			
Total	Mollie Burke (incumbent)	798	99.50%	+0.20%
Write-in		4	0.50%	-0.20%
Total votes		802	100.00%	
	Blank	125		

2016 Vermont House of Representatives Windham-2-2 district Democratic primary
Party	Candidate	Votes	%	±%
Democratic	Mollie Burke (incumbent)	473	100.00%	+0.34%
Total votes		473	100.00%	
	Blank	96		

2016 Vermont House of Representatives Windham-2-2 district election
Party	Candidate	Votes	%	±%
Progressive	Mollie Burke (incumbent)			
Democratic	Mollie Burke (incumbent)			
Total	Mollie Burke (incumbent)	1,445	81.55%	-17.95%
Independent	Adam Salviani	321	18.12%	+18.12%
Write-in		6	0.34%	-0.16%
Total votes		1,772	100.00%	
	Blank	111		
	Spoiled	2		

2018 Vermont House of Representatives Windham-2-2 district Democratic primary
Party	Candidate	Votes	%	±%
Democratic	Mollie Burke (incumbent)	568	98.95%	−1.05%
Write-in		6	1.05%	+1.05%
Total votes		574	100.00%	
	Blank	52		

2018 Vermont House of Representatives Windham-2-2 district election
Party	Candidate	Votes	%	±%
Progressive	Mollie Burke (incumbent)			
Democratic	Mollie Burke (incumbent)			
Total	Mollie Burke (incumbent)	1,491	99.60%	+18.05%
Write-in		6	0.40%	+0.06%
Total votes		1,497	100.00%	
	Blank	158		

2020 Vermont House of Representatives Windham-2-2 district Democratic primary
Party	Candidate	Votes	%	±%
Democratic	Mollie Burke (incumbent)	811	99.88%	+0.93%
Write-in		1	0.12%	-0.93%
Total votes		812	100.00%	
	Blank	47		

2020 Vermont House of Representatives Windham-2-2 district election
Party	Candidate	Votes	%	±%
Progressive	Mollie Burke (incumbent)			
Democratic	Mollie Burke (incumbent)			
Total	Mollie Burke (incumbent)	1,934	98.77%	-0.83%
Write-in		24	1.23%	+0.83%
Total votes		1,958	100.00%	
	Blank	281		
	Spoiled	3		

2022 Vermont House of Representatives Windham-8 district Democratic primary
Party	Candidate	Votes	%	±%
Democratic	Mollie Burke (incumbent)	816	99.88%	±0.00%
Write-in		1	0.12%	±0.00%
Total votes		817	100.00%	
	Blank	83		

2022 Vermont House of Representatives Windham-8 district election
Party	Candidate	Votes	%	±%
Democratic	Mollie Burke (incumbent)	1,447	89.60%	−9.17%
Republican	Rikki Risatti	164	10.15%	N/A
Write-in		4	0.25%	-0.98%
Total votes		1,615	100.00%	
	Blank	43		
	Spoiled	1		

2024 Vermont House of Representatives Windham-8 district Democratic primary
Party	Candidate	Votes	%	±%
Democratic	Mollie Burke (incumbent)	442	98.22%	−1.66%
Write-in		8	1.78%	+1.66%
Total votes		450	100.00%	
	Blank	34		

2024 Vermont House of Representatives Windham-8 district election
Party	Candidate	Votes	%	±%
Democratic	Mollie Burke (incumbent)	1,566	79.86%	−9.74%
Republican	William Harvey	323	16.47%	+6.32%
Independent	Ken Fay	69	3.52%	N/A
Write-in		3	0.15%	-0.10%
Total votes		1,961	100.00%	
	Blank	114		
	Spoiled	3		
