= Daniel Connor (politician) =

American politician and member of the Vermont State House of Representatives

Member of the Vermont House of Representatives from the Franklin-6 district
- In office 2013–2019

Personal details
- Party: Democratic
- Children: 2
- Education: University of Vermont (BS)

Daniel Connor is an American politician who served in the Vermont House of Representatives from 2012 to 2019.
