= David Sharpe (politician) =

American politician (born 1946)

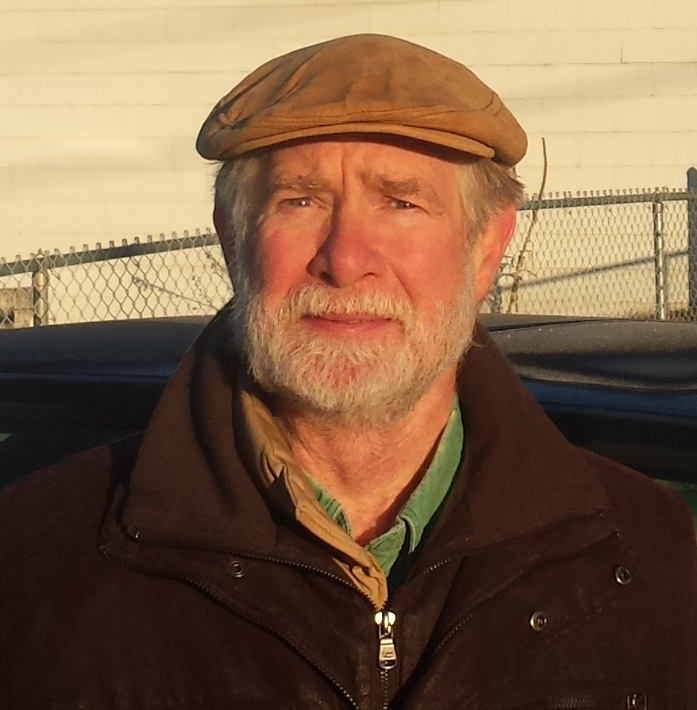

Member of the Vermont House of Representatives from the Addison-4 district
- Incumbent
- Assumed office January 7, 2003

Personal details
- Born: August 21, 1946 (age 80) Detroit, Michigan, U.S.
- Party: Democratic
- Spouse: Pat Sharpe
- Education: Kalamazooo College
- Profession: Teacher

David D. Sharpe (born August 21, 1946) is an American Democratic politician. Since January 2003 he serves as member of the Vermont House of Representatives from Addison-4 district.
