= Chip Conquest =

21st-century American politician

Member of the Vermont House of Representatives from the Orange-Caledonia district
- In office 2008–2021
- Succeeded by: Joseph Parsons

Personal details
- Born: Cleveland, Ohio
- Party: Democratic
- Children: 2
- Education: University of Vermont (BA) Evergreen State College (MA)

Chip Conquest is an American politician who served in the Vermont House of Representatives from 2008 to 2021.
