= Chris Bates (politician) =

American politician

Member of the Vermont House of Representatives from the Bennington 2-1 district
- In office January 9, 2019 – January 6, 2021

Personal details
- Party: Democratic

Chris Bates is an American politician. A member of the Democratic Party, he served in the Vermont House of Representatives from 2019 to 2021.
