= Stephen Carr (politician) =

American politician from Vermont

Member of the Vermont House of Representatives from the Rutland 6 District district
- In office 2013–2019
- Succeeded by: Stephanie Jerome

Personal details
- Born: Rutland County, Vermont
- Party: Democratic
- Education: Castleton State College

Stephen A. Carr is an American politician from Vermont. He was a Democratic member of the Vermont House of Representatives.

Carr denied DUI charges.
