= Marianna Gamache =

American politician and member of the Vermont State House of Representatives

Member of the Vermont House of Representatives from the Franklin-4 district
- In office 2015–2021
- Preceded by: Michel Consejo
- Succeeded by: Robert Norris

Personal details
- Born: New York City, U.S.
- Party: Republican
- Children: 1
- Education: State University of New York at Old Westbury (BA)

Marianna Gamache is an American politician who has served in the Vermont House of Representatives since 2014.
