= Diane Lanpher =

American politician (born 1955)

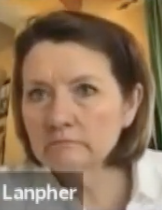

Member of the Vermont House of Representatives from the Addison 3rd district
- In office January 7, 2009 – January 8, 2025

Personal details
- Born: November 26, 1955 (age 70) Buffalo, New York, U.S.

Diane M. Lanpher (born November 26, 1955) is an American Democratic politician. She was a member of the Vermont House of Representatives from the Addison's 3rd District, being first elected in 2008. She was unseated in the 2024 Vermont House of Representatives election. After leaving elected politics she is now a healthcare advocate.
