= Clem Bissonnette =

American politician

Member of the Vermont House of Representatives from the Chittenden-6-7 district
- In office 2009–2019
- Succeeded by: Hal Colston

Personal details
- Born: April 8, 1945 (age 81) Winooski, Vermont, U.S.
- Party: Democratic
- Spouse: Sharon
- Education: Champlain College

Clement Joseph Bissonnette (born April 8, 1945) is an American politician in the state of Vermont. He was a member of the Vermont House of Representatives, sitting as a Democrat from the Chittenden-6-7 district, representing Winooski and part of Burlington, Vermont. He was first elected in 2008.

In September 2018, Bissonnette announced that he and his wife Sharon had decided to move to Guildhall, Vermont, so he would no longer be able to represent Winooski. However, because the move was sudden Bissonnette was still on the 2018 ballot in Winooski. He won reelection despite his plans to move. Bissonette initially said he would serve the term he was elected to, but ultimately resigned his seat moved to Guildhall in early 2019.

Governor Phil Scott appointed Hal Colston to replace Bissonnette for the 2019 and 2020 term.
