= Cynthia Browning =

American politician and member of the Vermont State House of Representatives

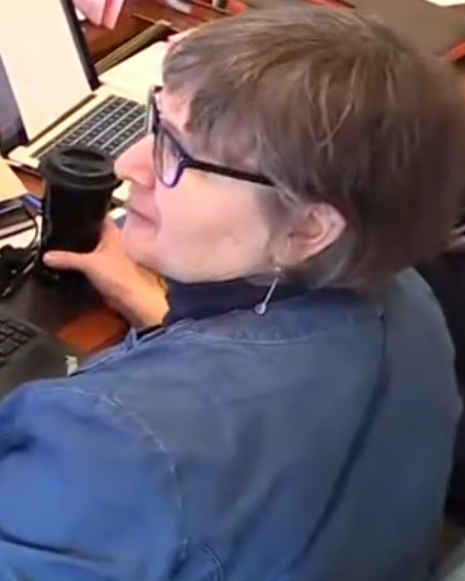
- Browning in 2020

Member of the Vermont House of Representatives from the Bennington-4 district
- In office 2007 – January 2021
- Succeeded by: Seth Bongartz

Personal details
- Born: Rochester, New York
- Party: Independent (2020-present); Democratic (until 2020)
- Education: Bennington College (BA) University of Michigan (MA) (PhD)

Cynthia Browning is an American politician who served in the Vermont House of Representatives from 2007 to 2021.
