= Peter Fagan (politician) =

American politician

Member of the Vermont House of Representatives from the Rutland 5-1 district
- In office 2009–2023
- Preceded by: Virginia McCormack

Personal details
- Party: Republican

Peter Fagan is an American Republican politician who represented Rutland-5-1 district in the Vermont House of Representatives from 2009 until 2023. He retired from the house before the 2022 Vermont House of Representatives election.
