= Albert Pearce =

American politician from Vermont (fl. 2010s)

Member of the Vermont House of Representatives from the Franklin-5 district
- In office 2009–2019
- Succeeded by: Charen Fegard

Personal details
- Born: Greenfield, Massachusetts
- Party: Republican
- Education: Middle Tennessee State University (BS, physical education; master of education)

Albert Pearce is an American politician who served in the Vermont House of Representatives from 2009 to 2019.
