= Terence Macaig =

American politician

Member of the Vermont House of Representatives from the Chittenden-2 district
- Incumbent
- Assumed office 2009

Personal details
- Born: October 23, 1938 (age 87)
- Party: Democratic
- Education: University of Vermont

Terence D. Macaig (born October 23, 1938) is an American politician in the state of Vermont. He is a member of the Vermont House of Representatives, sitting as a Democrat from the Chittenden-2 district, having been first elected in 2008.
