= Jim Condon (politician) =

American politician

Member of the Vermont House of Representatives from the Chittenden-9-1 district
- In office 2005 – August 23, 2018

Personal details
- Born: May 19, 1958 New London, Connecticut, U.S.
- Died: August 23, 2018 (aged 60) Colchester, Vermont, U.S.
- Party: Democratic
- Children: 1
- Education: University of Connecticut-Storrs
- Occupation: Broadcaster

James O'Neill Condon (May 19, 1958 – August 23, 2018) was an American politician in the state of Vermont. He served in the Vermont House of Representatives as a Democrat from the Chittenden-9-1 district from 2004 to 2018.

He was born in Connecticut and attended the University of Connecticut, Storrs, attaining a Bachelor of Arts in 1981. Condon came to Vermont in 1980 to work in the radio industry as a news director. He also had a radio show on WKDR along with Louie Manno, the Manno and Condon Show. He also served as executive director of the Vermont Association of Broadcasters and as president of the Vermont Associated Press Broadcasters Association. Condon was first elected to the Vermont General Assembly in 2004, and served until his death from esophageal cancer in 2018, shortly after announcing his decision to not run for re-election. He was married to Ginny McGehee with one son, and resided in Colchester, Vermont.
