= George Till =

American politician

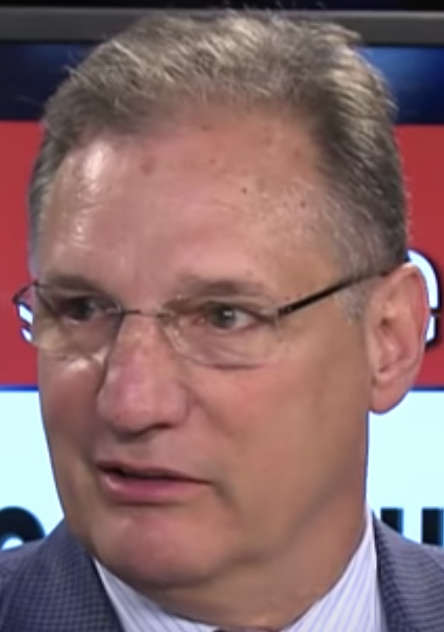
- Till in 2018

Member of the Vermont House of Representatives from the Chittenden 3rd district
- Incumbent
- Assumed office January 7, 2009
- Preceded by: Gaye Symington

Personal details
- Born: November 7, 1952 (age 73) Pittsburgh, Pennsylvania, U.S.

George W. Till (born November 7, 1952) is an American Democratic politician and physician. He is a member of the Vermont House of Representatives from the Chittenden 3rd District, having first been elected in 2008.
