= Heidi Scheuermann =

American politician from Vermont

Heidi E. Scheuermann is an American politician who served in the Vermont House of Representatives as a member of the Republican Party. She represented the Lamoille-1 Representative District. Before being a State Representative, she served on the Town of Stowe's Select Board from 2004 to 2010, which included two terms as chair of the Select Board. After sixteen years in the Vermont State House, she did not run for reelection in 2022.

She is also an owner of Allegro Properties, a commercial and residential real estate company that oversees apartments owned by herself, her parents, and her siblings.

== Early life ==
Scheuermann was born in Burlington, Vermont. She grew up in the Village of Stowe and attended Stowe High School. She earned her bachelor's degree in Arts Education from St. Louis University, and then spent three years from 1994 to 1997 in the United States Peace Corps. During her time in the Peace Corps, she taught English as a Second Language in Klodzko, Poland.

== National Politics ==
On December 11, 2013, then Lieutenant Governor Phil Scott and Heidi Scheuermann hosted then New Jersey Governor Chris Christie at the state Republican Party's 'Welcome Winter Gala'. The event was held at the Champlain Valley Expo in Essex Junction. Scheuermann told Vtdigger "We're looking forward to hearing and learning from Gov. Christie about how he's been able to do it in a blue state. We have a lot of similarities. We're excited to hear his message."

== Presidential Politics ==
Scheuermann has endorsed Libertarian Party candidate Gary Johnson for the 2016 presidential election.

== Electoral history ==
Vermont State House of Representatives election in Lamoille 1, 2006 - General Election
Party	Candidate	Votes	%
Republican	Heidi Scheuermann	1,370	58.5
Democratic	Cam Page	968	41.4
Write-in Votes	N/A	2	0.1

Vermont State House of Representative election in Lamoille 1, 2018 - General Election
Party	Candidate	Votes	%
Republican	Heidi Scheuermann	1369	51.6
Democratic	Marina Meerburg	1281	48.4
Write-in Votes	N/A	0	0
