= Carolyn Partridge =

American politician and member of the Vermont State House of Representatives

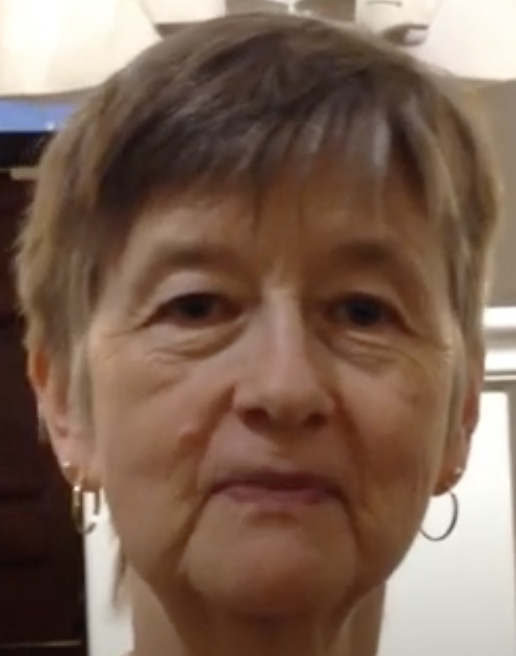
- Partridge in 2014

Member of the Vermont House of Representatives from the Windham 3 district
- Incumbent
- Assumed office 1999

Personal details
- Born: Hackensack, New Jersey, U.S.
- Party: Democratic
- Children: 3
- Education: New York University (BA)

Carolyn Partridge is an American politician who has served in the Vermont House of Representatives from 1999 to 2023. In 2022, she was elected one of the assistant judges of Windham County, Vermont.
