= Gabrielle Lucke =

American politician and member of the Vermont State House of Representatives

Member of the Vermont House of Representatives from the Windsor-4-2 District
- In office 2014–2019
- Succeeded by: Rebecca White

Personal details
- Born: Ringwood, New Jersey, U.S.
- Party: Democratic
- Education: St. Mary’s College of Maryland (BA); Shippensburg University of Pennsylvania (MS)

Gabrielle Lucke is an American politician who served in the Vermont House of Representatives from 2014 to 2019.
