= Helen Head =

American politician and member of the Vermont State House of Representatives

Member of the Vermont House of Representatives from the Chittenden 7-3 district
- In office 2002–2019

Personal details
- Born: Griffin, Georgia
- Party: Democratic
- Children: 2
- Education: University of New Hampshire (BA) University of Vermont (MPA)

Helen Head is an American politician who served in the Vermont House of Representatives from 2002 to 2019.
