= Brian K. Savage =

American politician

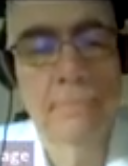
Brian Savage

Brian K. Savage (born April 12, 1955) is a Republican member of the Vermont House of Representatives. He is one of two representatives from the Franklin-4 District that consists of the Towns of Swanton and Sheldon. He was first elected to his seat in 2008 and won re-election in 2010 and again in 2012 as well as in 2014. In late 2014 he was again re-elected as the Assistant Minority Leader by the House Republican Caucus. He is lifelong resident of Swanton and is married with three adult children.
