= Ann Pugh =

American politician

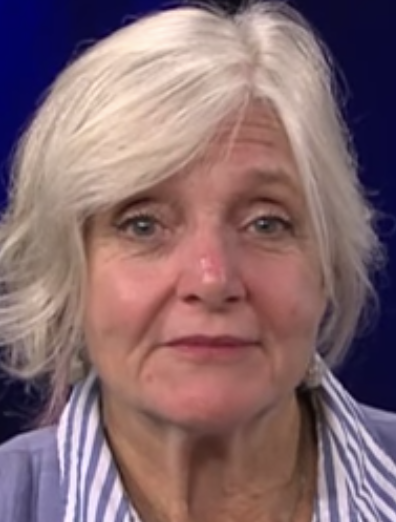
- Pugh in 2018

Member of the Vermont House of Representatives from the Chittenden 7-2 district
- Incumbent
- Assumed office 1993

Personal details
- Born: Rye, New York, U.S.
- Party: Democratic
- Children: 1
- Education: Union College (BA) Washington University in St. Louis (MSW) University of Vermont (CAS)

Ann Pugh is an American politician who has served in the Vermont House of Representatives since 1993.
