= David Deen =

American politician (born 1944)

Member of the Vermont House of Representatives from the Windham-4 district
- In office 1991–2019
- Succeeded by: Nader Hashim

Personal details
- Born: December 20, 1944 (age 81) Abington, Pennsylvania, U.S.
- Party: Democratic
- Education: University of Connecticut, Storrs

David L. Deen (born December 20, 1944) is an American politician in the state of Vermont. He was a member of the Vermont House of Representatives, sitting as a Democrat from the Windham-4 district, having been first elected in 1990. Deen served for years as chair of the House Committee on Natural Resources, Fish and Wildlife. He was a member of the Vermont Senate from 1987 to 1988.
