= Kate Webb (politician) =

American politician and member of the Vermont State House of Representatives

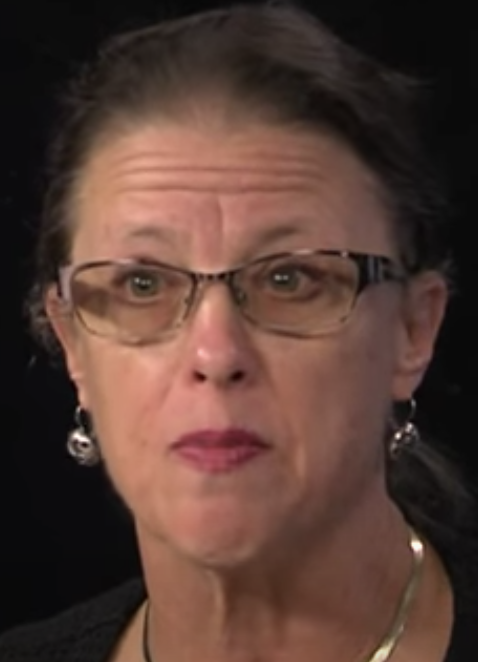
- Webb in 2018

Member of the Vermont House of Representatives from the Chittenden-5-1 district
- In office 2009–2023
- Succeeded by: Kate Lalley

Personal details
- Born: Maine, U.S.
- Party: Democratic
- Children: 2
- Education: University of Vermont (BA, MS)

Kate Webb is an American politician who served in the Vermont House of Representatives from 2009 to 2023.
