= Alice Emmons =

American politician (born 1955)

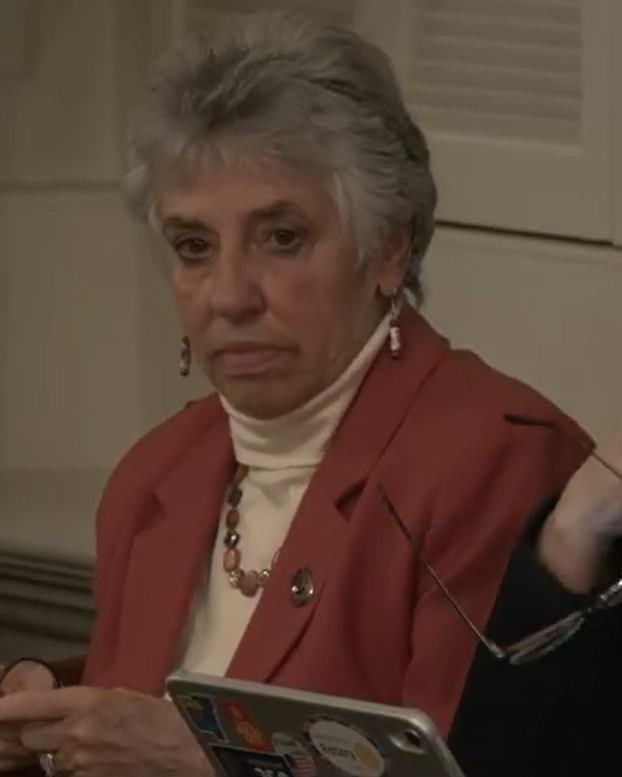
- Emmons in 2026

Member of the Vermont House of Representatives from the Windsor-3-2 district
- Incumbent
- Assumed office January 5, 1983

Personal details
- Born: February 14, 1955 (age 71) Springfield, Vermont, U.S.
- Party: Democratic
- Spouse: John Middleton
- Education: University of New Hampshire
- Occupation: Businesswoman

Alice M. Emmons (born February 14, 1955) is an American politician in the state of Vermont. A Democrat, she is a member of the Vermont House of Representatives from the Windsor-3-2 district, having been first elected in 1982.

Emmons was born in Springfield, Vermont. She was educated in the schools of Springfield and graduated from Springfield High School in 1973. In 1977, she received her Bachelor of Science degree from the University of New Hampshire in Durham. Emmons is the owner and operator of Lamps & Shades by Alice.

A Democrat, Emmons has served on Springfield's Board of Civil Authority. In 1982, she was elected to the Vermont House of Representatives, and she has been reelected every two years through 2024. Emmons has been chair of the House Corrections and Institutions Committee since 2005, and has been the Dean of the House (its longest-tenured member) since the 2011 resignation of Michael J. Obuchowski. At 43 years as of 2025, she is the longest tenured member of the Vermont House in state history.
