= Alice Nitka =

American politician

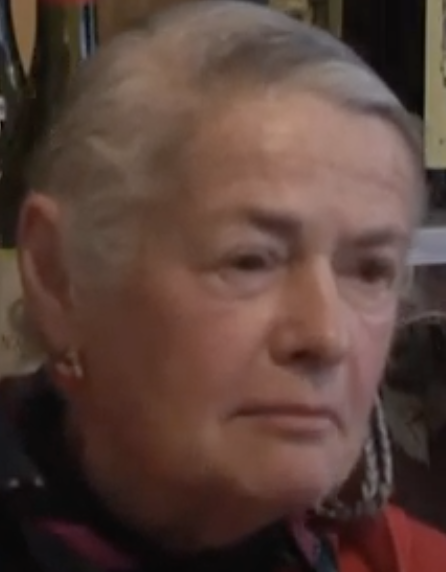
- Nitka in 2020
- Born: 1944 (age 81–82)
- Political party: Democratic

Alice Nitka (born 1944) is an American politician and former member of the Vermont Senate, where she represented the Windsor District which includes Ludlow, Vermont. A member of the Democratic Party, she served as vice chair of the Senate Committee on Appropriations.

Nitka is married and has two daughters.
