= Kathleen Keenan =

American politician (born 1940)

Member of the Vermont House of Representatives from the Franklin 3-1 district
- Incumbent
- Assumed office April 11, 1989

Personal details
- Born: May 7, 1940 (age 86) Burlington, Vermont, U.S.
- Party: Democratic
- Education: Jeanne Mance School of Nursing; University of Vermont
- Occupation: nurse

Kathleen C. Keenan (born May 7, 1940) is an American politician in the state of Vermont. She is a member of the Vermont House of Representatives, sitting as a Democrat from the Franklin 3-1 district, having been first elected in 1988.
