= 2026 Vermont House of Representatives election =

- November 3, 2026

All 150 seats in the Vermont House of Representatives 76 seats needed for a majority
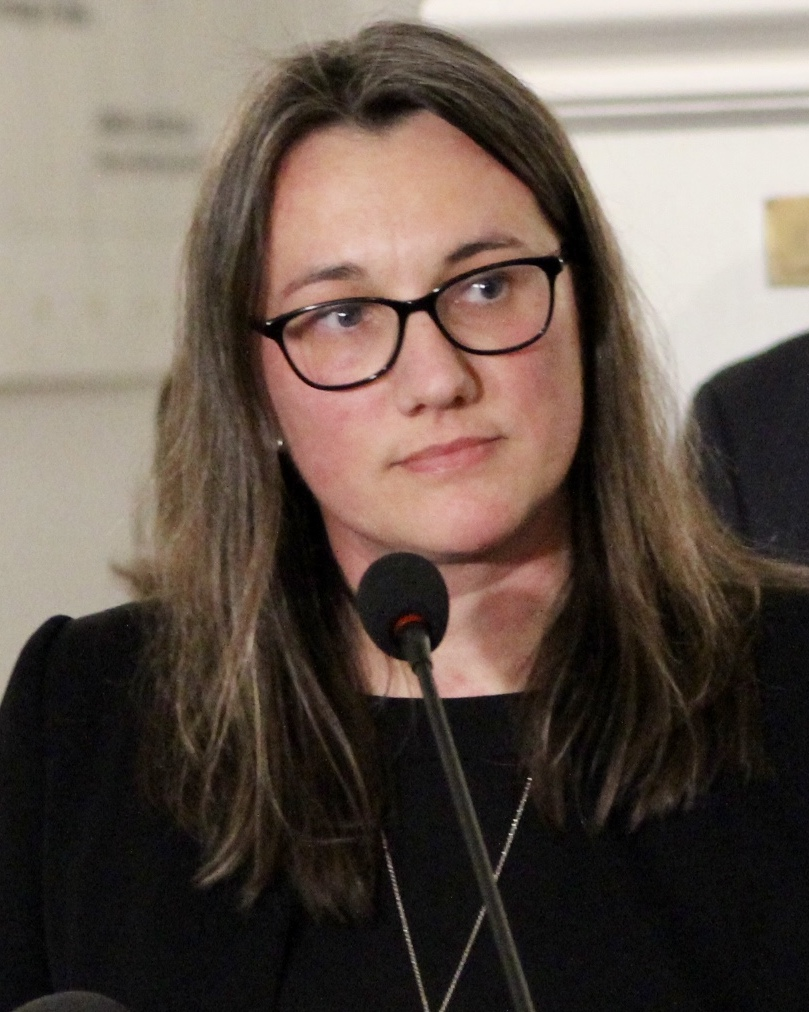

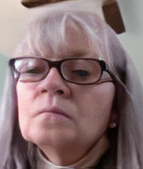

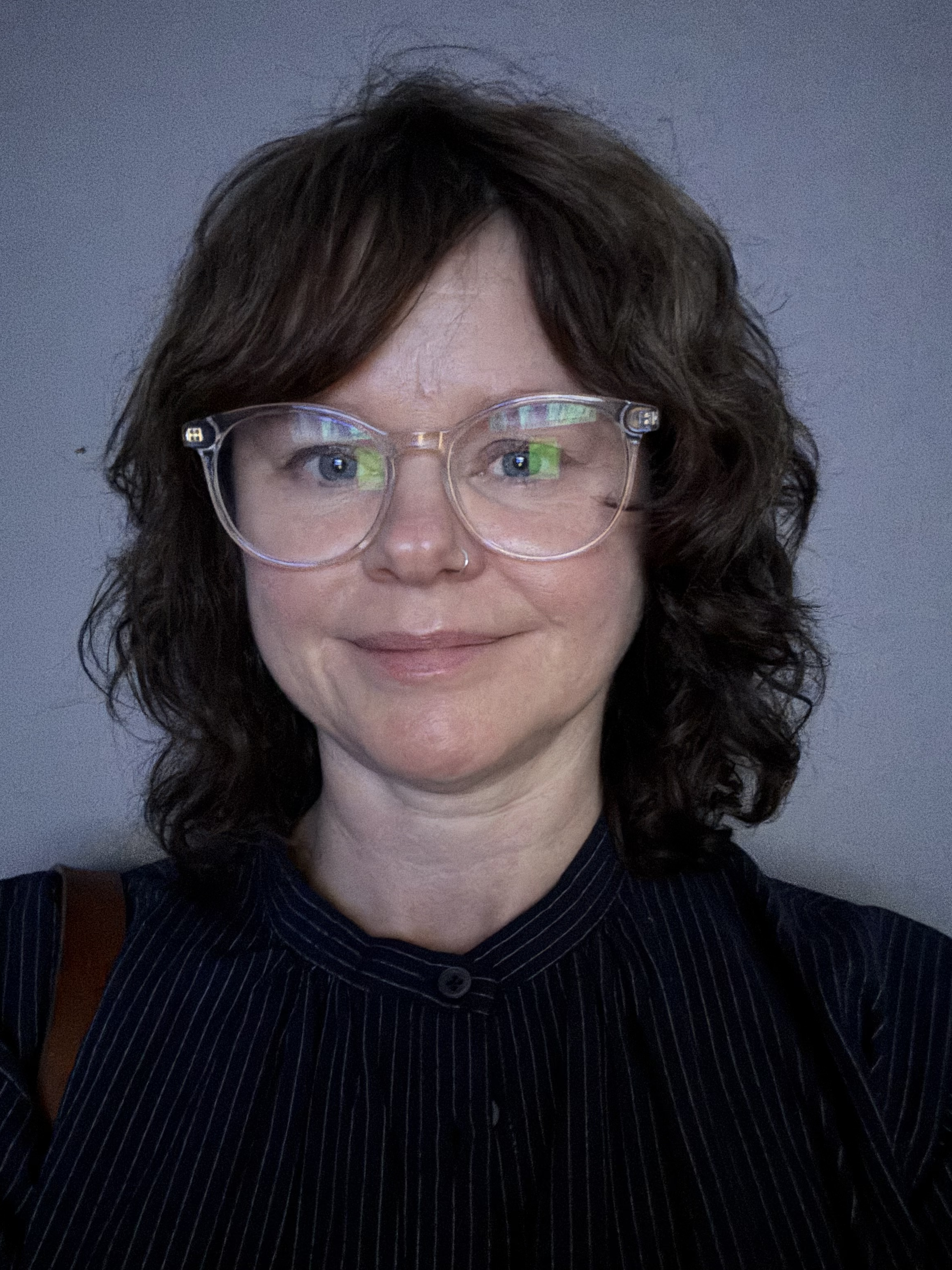
	Majority party	Minority party	Third party
Leader	Jill Krowinski (retiring)	Patricia McCoy	Kate Logan (retiring)
Party	Democratic	Republican	Progressive
Leader since	January 6, 2021	January 9, 2019	December 16, 2024
Leader's seat	Chittenden-16	Rutland-1	Chittenden-16
Last election	87	56	4
Seats before	87	56	3
Seats after	102	38	7
Seat change	▲15	▼18	▲4
	Fourth party
Leader	none
Party	Independent
Leader since	N/A
Leader's seat	N/A
Last election	3
Seats before	4
Seats after	3
Seat change	▼1
Speaker before election
Jill Krowinski
Democratic
Elected Speaker
TBD

The 2026 Vermont House of Representatives election was held on November 3, 2026, alongside the other 2026 United States elections. Voters elected members of the Vermont House of Representatives in all 150 of the U.S. state of Vermont's legislative districts to serve a two-year term.

== Retirements ==
=== Democrats ===
1. Addison-1: Amy Sheldon is retiring.
2. Addison-2: Peter Conlon is retiring.
3. Addison-3: Matt Birong is retiring.
4. Addison-4: Herb Olson is retiring.
5. Bennington-4: Kathleen James is retiring.
6. Caledonia-Essex: Scott Campbell is retiring.
7. Chittenden-4: Phil Pouech is retiring.
8. Chittenden-13: Tiffany Bluemle is retiring.
9. Chittenden-14: Barbara Rachelson and Mary-Katherine Stone are retiring.
10. Chittenden-16: Jill Krowinski is retiring.
11. Chittenden-18: Kevin Scully is retiring.
12. Lamoille-3: Lucy Boyden is retiring.
13. Orange-2: Monique Priestley is retiring to run for state senate.
14. Orange-Washington-Addison: Jay Hooper is retiring.
15. Rutland-6: Mary Howard is retiring.
16. Washington-4: Conor Casey is retiring.
17. Washington-Chittenden: Tom Stevens is retiring.
18. Windham-3: Leslie Goldman is retiring.
19. Windham-8: Mollie Burke is retiring.
20. Windsor-1: Elizabeth Burrows is retiring to run for state senate.
21. Windsor-6: Kevin Christie and Esme Cole are retiring.
22. Windsor-Orange-2: Rebecca Holcombe is retiring.

=== Republicans ===
1. Caledonia-3: Martha Feltus is retiring.
2. Essex-Orleans: Larry Labor is retiring.
3. Franklin-1: Ashley Bartley is retiring to run for state senate and Carolyn Branagan is retiring.
4. Grand Isle-Chittenden: Leland Morgan is retiring.
5. Orange-3: Joshua Dobrovich is retiring.
6. Orange-Caledonia: Joseph Parsons is retiring.
7. Orleans-Lamoille: Michael Marcotte is retiring.
8. Rutland-3: Zachary Harvey is retiring.
9. Rutland-9: Todd Nielsen is retiring.

=== Progressives ===
1. Chittenden-16: Kate Logan is retiring.
2. Chittenden-21: Chloe Tomlinson is retiring.

== Incumbents defeated ==
=== In primary elections ===
==== Democrats ====
1. Windsor-1: John Bartholomew lost renomination to Dylan Morse and John Tansey.
2. Windsor-Orange 2: Jim Masland lost renomination to Dee Gish and Lauren Morando Rhim.

== Predictions ==
Source	Ranking	As of
Sabato's Crystal Ball	Safe D	January 22, 2026
State Navigate	Safe D	October 24, 2026

== Results ==
State House District	Incumbent	Party	Elected Representative	Outcome
Addison-1	Amy Sheldon	Dem	Mike Roy	Dem hold
Addison-1	Robin Scheu	Dem	Robin Scheu	Dem hold
Addison-2	Peter Conlon	Dem	Tanya Byker	Dem hold
Addison-3	Matt Birong	Dem	John Stroup	Dem hold
Addison-3	Rob North	Rep	Ariel Bolles	Dem flip
Addison-4	Karen Lueders	Dem	Karen Lueders	
Addison-4	Herb Olson	Dem	Jeanne Albert	
Addison-5	Jubilee McGill	Dem	Jubilee McGill	
Addison-Rutland	Jim Casey	Rep	Jonathan Hescock	Dem flip
Bennington-1	Jonathan Cooper	Dem	Jonathan Cooper	
Bennington-2	Timothy R. Corcoran II	Dem	Timothy R. Corcoran II	
Bennington-2	William "Will" Greer	Dem	William "Will" Greer	
Bennington-3	David K. Durfee	Dem	David K. Durfee	
Bennington-4	Kathleen James	Dem	Thomas West	
Bennington-4	Robert Hunter	Dem	Robert Hunter	
Bennington-5	Mary A. Morrissey	Rep	Tom Blakely	Dem flip
Bennington-5	Michael Nigro	Dem	Michael Nigro	
Bennington-Rutland	Sandra "Sandy" Pinsonault	Rep	Mike Rice	Dem flip
Caledonia-1	Debra Powers	Rep	David Tucker	Dem flip
Caledonia-2	Michael "Mike" Southworth	Rep	Michael "Mike" Southworth	
Caledonia-3	Martha "Marty" Feltus	Rep	Dennis LaBounty	Dem flip
Caledonia-3	Beth M. Quimby	Rep	Beth M. Quimby	
Caledonia-Essex	R. Scott Campbell	Dem	Amanda Cochrane	
Caledonia-Essex	Deborah Cordz Dolgin	Rep	Deborah Cordz Dolgin	
Caledonia-Washington	Greg Burtt	Rep	Greg Burtt	
Chittenden-1	Jana Brown	Dem		
Chittenden-2	Erin Brady	Dem		
Chittenden-2	Angela Arsenault	Dem		
Chittenden-3	Trevor Squirrell	Dem		
Chittenden-3	Edye Graning	Dem		
Chittenden-4	Phil Pouech	Dem		
Chittenden-5	Chea Waters Evans	Dem		
Chittenden-6	Kate Lalley	Dem		
Chittenden-7	Shawn Sweeney	Dem		
Chittenden-8	Bridget Burkhardt	Dem		
Chittenden-9	Emilie Krasnow	Dem		
Chittenden-10	Kate Nugent	Dem		
Chittenden-11	Brian Minier	Dem		
Chittenden-12	Martin LaLonde	Dem		
Chittenden-13	Tiff Bluemle	Dem		
Chittenden-13	Bram Kleppner	Dem		
Chittenden-14	Barbara Rachelson	Dem/Prog		
Chittenden-14	Mary-Katherine Stone	Dem		
Chittenden-15	Brian Cina	Prog/Dem		Dem flip
Chittenden-15	Troy Headrick	Prog/Dem		
Chittenden-16	Jill Krowinski	Dem	Trang Do	Dem
Chittenden-16	Kate Logan	Prog/Dem		
Chittenden-17	Abbey Duke	Dem		
Chittenden-18	Carol Ode	Dem		
Chittenden-18	Robert J. Hooper	Dem		
Chittenden-19	Sarita Austin	Dem		
Chittenden-19	Wendy Critchlow	Dem		
Chittenden-20	Doug Bishop	Dem		
Chittenden-20	Gayle Pezzo	Dem		
Chittenden-21	Daisy Berbeco	Dem		
Chittenden-21	Chloe Tomlinson	Prog/Dem		
Chittenden-22	Lori Houghton	Dem		
Chittenden-22	Karen Dolan	Dem		
Chittenden-23	Leonora Dodge	Dem		
Chittenden-23	Golrang "Rey" Garofano	Dem		
Chittenden-24	Alyssa Black	Dem		
Chittenden-25	Brenda Steady	Rep		Dem flip
Chittenden-Franklin	Chris Taylor	Rep		
Chittenden-Franklin	Anthony "Tony" Micklus	Rep		
Essex-Caledonia	John Kascenska	Rep		
Essex-Orleans	Larry Labor	Rep		
Franklin-1	Ashley R. Bartley	Rep		
Franklin-1	Carolyn Branagan	Rep		
Franklin-2	Eileen "Lynn" Dickinson	Rep		
Franklin-3	Joe Luneau	Rep		Dem flip
Franklin-4	Matthew E. Walker	Rep		
Franklin-4	Thomas "Tom" Oliver Jr.	Rep		
Franklin-5	Lisa A. Hango	Rep		
Franklin-5	Wayne A. Laroche	Rep		
Franklin-6	James Gregoire	Rep		
Franklin-7	Allen "Penny" Demar	Rep		
Franklin-8	Casey Toof	Rep		Dem flip
Grand Isle-Chittenden	Michael R. Morgan	Rep		
Grand Isle-Chittenden	Leland Morgan	Rep		
Lamoille-1	Jed Lipsky	Independent		
Lamoille-2	Daniel Noyes	Dem		
Lamoille-2	Richard J. Bailey	Rep		Dem flip
Lamoille-3	Lucy Boyden	Dem		Ind flip
Lamoille-Washington	Saudia LaMont	Dem		
Lamoille-Washington	David Yacovone	Dem		
Orange-1	Michael Tagliavia	Rep		
Orange-2	Monique Priestley	Dem		
Orange-3	Joshua Dobrovich	Rep	Fran Covey	Rep
Orange-Caledonia	Joe Parsons	Rep		
Orange-Washington-Addison	Jay Hooper	Dem		
Orange-Washington-Addison	Larry Satcowitz	Dem		
Orleans-1	Richard M. Nelson	Rep		
Orleans-2	Woodman "Woody" H. Page	Rep		
Orleans-3	Ken Wells	Rep		
Orleans-4	Leanne Harple	Dem		
Orleans-Lamoille	Mark A. Higley	Rep		
Orleans-Lamoille	Michael J. Marcotte	Rep		
Rutland-1	Patricia A. McCoy	Rep		
Rutland-2	Thomas "Tom" Burditt	Rep		
Rutland-2	David "Dave" Bosch	Rep		
Rutland-3	Chris Brown	Rep		
Rutland-4	Christopher Howland	Rep		
Rutland-5	Eric Maguire	Rep		
Rutland-6	Mary E. Howard	Dem	Chris Siliski	
Rutland-7	Chris Keyser	Rep		
Rutland-8	Alicia Malay	Rep/Dem		
Rutland-9	Todd Nielsen	Rep	Jeff Haylon	Dem flip
Rutland-10	William "Bill" Canfield	Rep		
Rutland-11	Jim Harrison	Rep		
Rutland-Bennington	Chris Pritchard	Rep		
Rutland-Windsor	Kevin C. Winter	Rep	Phoebe Tucker	Dem flip
Washington-1	Anne B. Donahue (Note: Re-elected in 2024 as an independent)	Independent		Rep flip
Washington-1	Kenneth W. Goslant	Rep		
Washington-2	Dara Torre	Dem		
Washington-2	Candice White	Dem		
Washington-3	Edward "Teddy" Waszazak	Dem		
Washington-3	Michael Boutin	Rep		Dem flip
Washington-4	Kate McCann	Dem		
Washington-4	Conor Casey	Dem		
Washington-5	Elanor "Ela" Chapin	Dem		
Washington-6	Marc Mihaly	Dem		
Washington-Chittenden	Theresa A. Wood	Dem		
Washington-Chittenden	Thomas Stevens	Dem		
Washington-Orange	Francis "Topper" McFaun	Rep/Dem		
Washington-Orange	Gina Galfetti	Rep		
Windham-1	Zon Eastes	Dem		
Windham-2	Laura Sibilia	Independent		
Windham-3	Leslie Goldman	Dem		
Windham-3	Michelle Bos-Lun	Dem		
Windham-4	Mike Mrowicki	Dem/Prog		
Windham-5	Emily Long	Dem		
Windham-6	Emily Carris-Duncan	Dem		
Windham-7	Emilie Kornheiser	Dem		
Windham-8	Mollie Burke	Dem		
Windham-9	Ian Goodnow	Dem		
Windham-Windsor-Bennington	Christopher Morrow	Dem		
Windsor-1	John Bartholomew	Dem		
Windsor-1	Elizabeth Burrows	Dem		
Windsor-2	VL Coffin IV	Rep		Dem flip
Windsor-3	Alice Emmons	Dem		
Windsor-3	Kristi Morris	Dem		
Windsor-4	Heather Surprenant	Dem		
Windsor-5	Charlie Kimbell	Dem		
Windsor-6	Kevin Christie	Dem		
Windsor-6	Esme Cole	Dem/Prog		
Windsor-Addison	Kirk White	Dem		
Windsor-Orange-1	John O'Brien	Dem		
Windsor-Orange-2	Rebecca Holcombe	Dem		
Windsor-Orange-2	Jim Masland	Dem		
Windsor-Windham	Thomas F. Charlton	Rep		Dem flip

== Crossover seats ==
30 districts voted for one party in the 2024 presidential election and another in the 2024 house election.

=== Democratic ===
This lists the districts in which Donald Trump won in 2024 but were represented by Democrats.

District		Incumbent		
#	Trump margin of victory in 2024	Member	Party	Incumbent margin of victory in 2024
Bennington-1	R+7.87	Jonathan Cooper	Democratic	D+0.92

=== Republican ===
This lists the districts in which Kamala Harris won in 2024 but were represented by Republicans:

District		Incumbent		
#	Harris margin of victory in 2024	Member	Party	Incumbent margin of victory in 2024
Addison-Rutland	D+13.35	Jim Casey	Republican	Unopposed
Bennington-Rutland	D+25.78	Sandy Pinsonault	Republican	R+9.24
Caledonia-1	D+6.53	Debra Powers	Republican	R+15.08
Caledonia-2	D+19.87	Michael Southworth	Republican	R+17.02
Caledonia-Washington	D+24.06	Greg Burtt	Republican	R+12.64
Chittenden-25	D+20.95	Brenda Steady	Republican	R+5.14
Chittenden-Franklin	D+10.97	Chris Taylor and Anthony Micklus	Republican	R+2.62
Franklin-1	D+7.79	Carolyn Branagan and Ashley Bartley	Republican	Unopposed
Franklin-2	D+6.96	Eileen Dickinson	Republican	Unopposed
Franklin-3	D+29.14	Joe Luneau	Republican	R+8.14
Franklin-6	D+12.19	James Gregoire	Republican	Unopposed
Franklin-7	D+0.66	Penny Demar	Republican	R+33.41
Franklin-8	D+21.22	Casey Toof	Republican	R+26.24
Grand Isle-Chittenden	D+18.89	Michael Morgan and Leland Morgan	Republican	R+7.69
Orange-1	D+1.40	Joseph Parsons	Republican	R+6.85
Orleans-2	D+11.54	Woodman Page	Republican	Unopposed
Orleans-3	D+1.16	Ken Wells	Republican	Unopposed
Rutland-4	D+17.57	Christopher Howland	Republican	R+11.87
Rutland-5	D+18.91	Eric Maguire	Republican	Unopposed
Rutland-7	D+12.37	Chris Keyser	Republican	R+16.02
Rutland-8	D+2.49	Alicia Malay	Republican	Unopposed
Rutland-9	D+7.87	Todd Nielsen	Republican	R+8.81
Rutland-11	D+19.95	Jim Harrison	Republican	Unopposed
Rutland-Bennington	D+6.80	Chris Pritchard	Republican	R+12.12
Rutland-Windsor	D+10.32	Kevin Winter	Republican	R+15.33
Washington-1	D+21.46	Kenneth Goslant	Republican	R+16.48
Washington-Orange	D+7.52	Gina Galfetti and Topper McFaun	Republican	R+14.13
Windsor-2	D+9.53	VL Coffin	Republican	R+5.35
Windsor-Windham	D+21.32	Thomas F. Charlton	Republican	R+1.62

== Detailed results ==
=== Addison-1 ===
- Elects two representatives.

General election

Addison-1 general election, 2026
Party	Candidate	Votes	%
Democratic	Robin Scheu (incumbent)		
Democratic	Mike Roy		
Write-in			
Total votes			

=== Addison-2 ===
- Elects one representative.

General election

Addison-2 general election, 2026
Party	Candidate	Votes	%
Democratic	Tanya Byker		
Republican	Annie Wilson		
Write-in			
Total votes			

=== Addison-3 ===
- Elects two representatives.

General election

Addison-3 general election, 2026
Party	Candidate	Votes	%
Republican	Rob North (incumbent)		
Democratic	John Stroup		
Democratic	Ariel Bolles		
Republican	Joe Baker		
Write-in			
Total votes			

=== Addison-4 ===
- Elects two representatives.

General election

Addison-4 general election, 2026
Party	Candidate	Votes	%
Democratic	Karen Lueders (incumbent)		
Democratic	Jeanne Albert		
Republican	Linn Dike		
Republican	Chanin Hill		
Write-in			
Total votes			

=== Addison-5 ===
- Elects one representative.

General election

Addison-5 general election, 2026
Party	Candidate	Votes	%
Democratic	Jubilee McGill (incumbent)		
Republican	Del Thompson		
Write-in			
Total votes			

=== Addison-Rutland ===
- Elects one representative.

General election

Addison-Rutland general election, 2026
Party	Candidate	Votes	%
Republican	Jim Casey (incumbent)		
Democratic	Jonathan Hescock		
Write-in			
Total votes			

=== Bennington-1 ===
- Elects one representative.

General election

Bennington-1 general election, 2026
Party	Candidate	Votes	%
Democratic	Jonathan Cooper (incumbent)		
Republican	Charles Jewett		
Write-in			
Total votes			

=== Bennington-2 ===
- Elects two representatives.

General election

Bennington-2 general election, 2026
Party	Candidate	Votes	%
Democratic	Timothy Corcoran II (incumbent)		
Democratic	Will Greer (incumbent)		
Republican	Anthony Cook		
Write-in			
Total votes			

=== Bennington-3 ===
- Elects one representative.

General election

Bennington-3 general election, 2026
Party	Candidate	Votes	%
Democratic	David Durfee (incumbent)		
Republican	Victor Harwood Jr.		
Write-in			
Total votes			

=== Bennington-4 ===
- Elects two representatives.

General election

Bennington-4 general election, 2026
Party	Candidate	Votes	%
Democratic	Rob Hunter (incumbent)		
Democratic	Thomas West		
Republican	Al Clayton		
Independent	Michael Fernandez		
Write-in			
Total votes			

=== Bennington-5 ===
- Elects two representatives.

General election

Bennington-5 general election, 2026
Party	Candidate	Votes	%
Republican	Mary Morrissey (incumbent)		
Democratic	Michael Nigro (incumbent)		
Democratic	Tom Blakely		
Write-in			
Total votes			

=== Bennington-Rutland ===
- Elects one representative.

General election

Bennington-Rutland general election, 2026
Party	Candidate	Votes	%
Republican	Sandy Pinsonault (incumbent)		
Democratic	Mike Rice		
Write-in			
Total votes			

=== Caledonia-1 ===
- Elects one representative.

General election

Caledonia-1 general election, 2026
Party	Candidate	Votes	%
Republican	Debra Powers (incumbent)		
Democratic	David Tucker		
Write-in			
Total votes			

=== Caledonia-2 ===
- Elects one representative.

General election

Caledonia-2 general election, 2026
Party	Candidate	Votes	%
Republican	Mike Southworth (incumbent)		
Democratic	Audrey Grant		
Write-in			
Total votes			

=== Caledonia-3 ===
- Elects two representatives.

General election

Caledonia-3 general election, 2026
Party	Candidate	Votes	%
Republican	Beth Quimby (incumbent)		
Republican	Erik LaVallee		
Democratic	Bill Coleman		
Democratic	Dennis LaBounty		
Write-in			
Total votes			

=== Caledonia-Essex ===
- Elects two representatives.

General election

Caledonia-Essex general election, 2026
Party	Candidate	Votes	%
Republican	Deborah Dolgin (incumbent)		
Republican	Steve Dolgin		
Democratic	Amanda Cochrane		
Democratic	Heather Young		
Independent	Brandolyn Bradley		
Write-in			
Total votes			

=== Caledonia-Washington ===
- Elects one representative.

General election

Caledonia-Washington general election, 2026
Party	Candidate	Votes	%
Republican	Greg Burtt (incumbent)		
Democratic	Eric Bach		
Write-in			
Total votes			

=== Chittenden-1 ===
- Elects one representative.

General election

Chittenden-1 general election, 2026
Party	Candidate	Votes	%
Democratic	Jana Brown (incumbent)		
Write-in			
Total votes			

=== Chittenden-2 ===
- Elects two representatives.

General election

Chittenden-2 general election, 2026
Party	Candidate	Votes	%
Democratic	Erin Brady (incumbent)		
Democratic	Angela Arsenault (incumbent)		
Write-in			
Total votes			

=== Chittenden-3 ===
- Elects two representatives.

General election

Chittenden-3 general election, 2026
Party	Candidate	Votes	%
Democratic	Trevor Squirrell (incumbent)		
Democratic	Edye Graning (incumbent)		
Write-in			
Total votes			

=== Chittenden-4 ===
- Elects one representative.

General election

Chittenden-4 general election, 2026
Party	Candidate	Votes	%
Democratic	Kelsey Pasteris		
Independent	John Kingston		
Write-in			
Total votes			

=== Chittenden-5 ===
- Elects one representative.

General election

Chittenden-5 general election, 2026
Party	Candidate	Votes	%
Democratic	Chea Evans (incumbent)		
Write-in			
Total votes			

=== Chittenden-6 ===
- Elects one representative.

General election

Chittenden-6 general election, 2026
Party	Candidate	Votes	%
Democratic	Kate Lalley (incumbent)		
Republican	Deb Mayfield		
Write-in			
Total votes			

=== Chittenden-7 ===
- Elects one representative.

General election

Chittenden-7 general election, 2026
Party	Candidate	Votes	%
Democratic	Shawn Sweeney (incumbent)		
Write-in			
Total votes			

=== Chittenden-8 ===
- Elects one representative.

General election

Chittenden-8 general election, 2026
Party	Candidate	Votes	%
Democratic	Bridget Burkhardt (incumbent)		
Republican	Mitchel Cypes		
Write-in			
Total votes			

=== Chittenden-9 ===
- Elects one representative.

General election

Chittenden-9 general election, 2026
Party	Candidate	Votes	%
Democratic	Emilie Krasnow (incumbent)		
Write-in			
Total votes			

=== Chittenden-10 ===
- Elects one representative.

General election

Chittenden-10 general election, 2026
Party	Candidate	Votes	%
Democratic	Kate Nugent (incumbent)		
Write-in			
Total votes			

=== Chittenden-11 ===
- Elects one representative.

General election

Chittenden-11 general election, 2026
Party	Candidate	Votes	%
Democratic	Brian Minier (incumbent)		
Write-in			
Total votes			

=== Chittenden-12 ===
- Elects one representative.

General election

Chittenden-12 general election, 2026
Party	Candidate	Votes	%
Democratic	Martin LaLonde (incumbent)		
Write-in			
Total votes			

=== Chittenden-13 ===
- Elects two representatives.

General election

Chittenden-13 general election, 2026
Party	Candidate	Votes	%
Democratic	Bram Kleppner (incumbent)		
Democratic	Karen Paul		
Write-in			
Total votes			

=== Chittenden-14 ===
- Elects two representatives.

General election

Chittenden-14 general election, 2026
Party	Candidate	Votes	%
Democratic	Adam Franz		
Democratic	Elizabeth Allen-Pennebaker		
Republican Party (United States)	Aaliyah Davila		
Write-in			
Total votes			

=== Chittenden-15 ===
- Elects two representatives.

General election

Chittenden-15 general election, 2026
Party	Candidate	Votes	%
Progressive (Democratic)	Brian Cina (incumbent)		
Independent	Troy Headrick (incumbent)		
Democratic	Benjamin Bosley		
Write-in			
Total votes			

=== Chittenden-16 ===
- Elects two representatives.

General election

Chittenden-16 general election, 2026
Party	Candidate	Votes	%
Democratic	Jeffrey Peterson		
Democratic	Trang Do		
Independent	Christopher Haessly		
Write-in			
Total votes			

=== Chittenden-17 ===
- Elects one representative.

General election

Chittenden-17 general election, 2026
Party	Candidate	Votes	%
Democratic	Abbey Duke (incumbent)		
Write-in			
Total votes			

=== Chittenden-18 ===
- Elects two representatives.

General election

Chittenden-18 general election, 2026
Party	Candidate	Votes	%
Democratic	Carol Ode (incumbent)		
Democratic	Ali Dieng		
Independent	Dave Hartnett		
Write-in			
Total votes			

=== Chittenden-19 ===
- Elects two representatives.

General election

Chittenden-19 general election, 2026
Party	Candidate	Votes	%
Democratic	Wendy Critchlow (incumbent)		
Democratic	Sarita Austin (incumbent)		
Republican	Alex Thibault		
Republican	Spencer Sherman		
Write-in			
Total votes			

=== Chittenden-20 ===
- Elects two representatives.

General election

Chittenden-20 general election, 2026
Party	Candidate	Votes	%
Democratic	Doug Bishop (incumbent)		
Democratic	Gayle Pezzo (incumbent)		
Republican	Bill Bezio		
Republican	Doug Wood		
Write-in			
Total votes			

=== Chittenden-21 ===
- Elects two representatives.

General election

Chittenden-21 general election, 2026
Party	Candidate	Votes	%
Democratic	Daisy Berbeco (incumbent)		
Democratic	Matt Gile		
Write-in			
Total votes			

=== Chittenden-22 ===
- Elects two representatives.

General election

Chittenden-22 general election, 2026
Party	Candidate	Votes	%
Democratic	Lori Houghton (incumbent)		
Democratic	Karen Dolan (incumbent)		
Republican	Brent Boerger		
Republican	Seth Manley		
Write-in			
Total votes			

=== Chittenden-23 ===
- Elects two representatives.

General election

Chittenden-23 general election, 2026
Party	Candidate	Votes	%
Democratic	Rey Garofano (incumbent)		
Democratic	Erik Post		
Republican	Lynn Smith		
Republican	Pearl Beckage		
Write-in			
Total votes			

=== Chittenden-24 ===
- Elects one representative.

General election

Chittenden-24 general election, 2026
Party	Candidate	Votes	%
Democratic	Alyssa Black (incumbent)		
Republican	Stephanie Mack		
Write-in			
Total votes			

=== Chittenden-25 ===
- Elects one representative.

General election

Chittenden-25 general election, 2026
Party	Candidate	Votes	%
Republican	Brenda Steady (incumbent)		
Democratic	Julia Andrews		
Write-in			
Total votes			

=== Chittenden-Franklin ===
- Elects two representatives.

General election

Chittenden-Franklin general election, 2026
Party	Candidate	Votes	%
Republican	Kumulia Long (incumbent)		
Republican	Tony Micklus (incumbent)		
Democratic	Natalie Cashen		
Democratic	Henry Bonges III		
Write-in			
Total votes			

=== Essex-Caledonia ===
- Elects one representative.

General election

Essex-Caledonia general election, 2026
Party	Candidate	Votes	%
Republican	John Kascenska II		
Write-in			
Total votes			

=== Essex-Orleans ===
- Elects one representative.

General election

Essex-Orleans general election, 2026
Party	Candidate	Votes	%
Republican	David Jacobs		
Independent	John Lally		
Write-in			
Total votes			

=== Franklin-1 ===
- Elects two representatives.

General election

Franklin-1 general election, 2026
Party	Candidate	Votes	%
Republican	Bob Stebbins		
Republican	Keith Billado		
Democratic	Julie Filiberti		
Democratic	Caroline Bright		
Write-in			
Total votes			

=== Franklin-2 ===
- Elects one representative.

General election

Franklin-2 general election, 2026
Party	Candidate	Votes	%
Republican	Eileen Dickinson (incumbent)		
Democratic	Pam McCarthy		
Write-in			
Total votes			

=== Franklin-3 ===
- Elects one representative.

General election

Franklin-3 general election, 2026
Party	Candidate	Votes	%
Republican	Joe Luneau (incumbent)		
Democratic	Suzanne Kenyon		
Write-in			
Total votes			

=== Franklin-4 ===
- Elects two representatives.

General election

Franklin-4 general election, 2026
Party	Candidate	Votes	%
Republican	Matthew Walker (incumbent)		
Republican	Tom Oliver Jr. (incumbent)		
Democratic	Tamar Bouchard		
Democratic	Carmela Mayette		
Write-in			
Total votes			

=== Franklin-5 ===
- Elects two representatives.

General election

Franklin-5 general election, 2026
Party	Candidate	Votes	%
Republican	Wayne Laroche (incumbent)		
Republican	Lisa Hango (incumbent)		
Write-in			
Total votes			

=== Franklin-6 ===
- Elects one representative.

General election

Franklin-6 general election, 2026
Party	Candidate	Votes	%
Republican	James Gregoire (incumbent)		
Write-in			
Total votes			

=== Franklin-7 ===
- Elects one representative.

General election

Franklin-7 general election, 2026
Party	Candidate	Votes	%
Republican	Penny Demar (incumbent)		
Write-in			
Total votes			

=== Franklin-8 ===
- Elects one representative.

General election

Franklin-8 general election, 2026
Party	Candidate	Votes	%
Republican	Jack Brigham (incumbent)		
Democratic	Zach Scheffler		
Write-in			
Total votes			

=== Grand Isle-Chittenden ===
- Elects two representatives.

General election

Grand Isle-Chittenden general election, 2026
Party	Candidate	Votes	%
Republican	Michael Morgan (incumbent)		
Republican	Josie Henry		
Democratic	Dave Skinner		
Democratic	Sylvia Jensen		
Write-in			
Total votes			

=== Lamoille-1 ===
- Elects one representative.

General election

Lamoille-1 general election, 2026
Party	Candidate	Votes	%
Independent	Jed Lipsky (incumbent)		
Write-in			
Total votes			

=== Lamoille-2 ===
- Elects two representatives.

General election

Lamoille-2 general election, 2026
Party	Candidate	Votes	%
Democratic	Daniel Noyes (incumbent)		
Republican	Richard Bailey (incumbent)		
Democratic	Jim Lipinski		
Republican	Malcolm Teale		
Write-in			
Total votes			

=== Lamoille-3 ===
- Elects two representatives.

General election

Lamoille-3 general election, 2026
Party	Candidate	Votes	%
Democratic	Deb Nevil		
Republican	Rebecca Pitre		
Independent	Adam Howard		
Write-in			
Total votes			

=== Lamoille-Washington ===
- Elects two representatives.

General election

Lamoille-Washington general election, 2026
Party	Candidate	Votes	%
Democratic	David Yacovone (incumbent)		
Democratic	Saudia LaMont (incumbent)		
Republican	Susanna Burnham		
Republican	Jason Thompson		
Write-in			
Total votes			

=== Orange-1 ===
- Elects one representative.

General election

Orange-1 general election, 2026
Party	Candidate	Votes	%
Republican	Michael Tagliavia (incumbent)		
Democratic	Gregory Wilson		
Write-in			
Total votes			

=== Orange-2 ===
- Elects one representative.

General election

Orange-2 general election, 2026
Party	Candidate	Votes	%
Democratic	Lance Mills		
Republican	Nicholas DiLorenzo		
Write-in			
Total votes			

=== Orange-3 ===
- Elects one representative.

General election

Orange-3 general election, 2026
Party	Candidate	Votes	%
Republican	Fran Covey		
Write-in			
Total votes			

=== Orange-Caledonia ===
- Elects one representative.

General election

Orange-Caledonia general election, 2026
Party	Candidate	Votes	%
Republican	Tom Otterman		
Democratic	Aiden Otterman		
Independent	Susan Culp		
Write-in			
Total votes			

=== Orange-Washington-Addison ===
- Elects two representatives.

General election

Orange-Washington-Addison general election, 2026
Party	Candidate	Votes	%
Democratic	Larry Satcowitz (incumbent)		
Democratic	Emery Mattheis		
Republican	Stephen Webster		
Republican	Charles Russell		
Write-in			
Total votes			

=== Orleans-1 ===
- Elects one representative.

General election

Orleans-1 general election, 2026
Party	Candidate	Votes	%
Republican	Richard Nelson (incumbent)		
Write-in			
Total votes			

=== Orleans-2 ===
- Elects one representative.

General election

Orleans-2 general election, 2026
Party	Candidate	Votes	%
Republican	Woodman Page (incumbent)		
Democratic	Xavier Stevens		
Write-in			
Total votes			

=== Orleans-3 ===
- Elects one representative.

General election

Orleans-3 general election, 2026
Party	Candidate	Votes	%
Republican	Ken Wells (incumbent)		
Write-in			
Total votes			

=== Orleans-4 ===
- Elects one representative.

General election

Orleans-4 general election, 2026
Party	Candidate	Votes	%
Democratic	Leanne Harple (incumbent)		
Write-in			
Total votes			

=== Orleans-Lamoille ===
- Elects two representatives.

General election

Orleans-Lamoille general election, 2026
Party	Candidate	Votes	%
Republican	Mark Higley (incumbent)		
Republican	Praneet Menon		
Write-in			
Total votes			

=== Rutland-1 ===
- Elects one representative.

General election

Rutland-1 general election, 2026
Party	Candidate	Votes	%
Republican	Patricia McCoy (incumbent)		
Write-in			
Total votes			

=== Rutland-2 ===
- Elects two representatives.

General election

Rutland-2 general election, 2026
Party	Candidate	Votes	%
Republican	Tom Burditt (incumbent)		
Republican	Dave Bosch (incumbent)		
Democratic	Marsha Cassel		
Write-in			
Total votes			

=== Rutland-3 ===
- Elects one representative.

General election

Rutland-3 general election, 2026
Party	Candidate	Votes	%
Republican	Chris Brown (incumbent)		
Write-in			
Total votes			

=== Rutland-4 ===
- Elects one representative.

General election

Rutland-4 general election, 2026
Party	Candidate	Votes	%
Republican	Christopher Howland (incumbent)		
Write-in			
Total votes			

=== Rutland-5 ===
- Elects one representative.

General election

Rutland-5 general election, 2026
Party	Candidate	Votes	%
Republican	Eric Maguire (incumbent)		
Write-in			
Total votes			

=== Rutland-6 ===
- Elects one representative. No candidates filed for this election.

General election

Rutland-6 general election, 2026
Party	Candidate	Votes	%
	Write-in		
Total votes			

=== Rutland-7 ===
- Elects one representative.

General election

Rutland-7 general election, 2026
Party	Candidate	Votes	%
Republican	Chris Keyser (incumbent)		
Write-in			
Total votes			

=== Rutland-8 ===
- Elects one representative.

General election

Rutland-8 general election, 2026
Party	Candidate	Votes	%
Republican	Alicia Malay (incumbent)		
Democratic	Genevieve Duchesneau		
Write-in			
Total votes			

=== Rutland-9 ===
- Elects one representative.

General election

Rutland-9 general election, 2026
Party	Candidate	Votes	%
Republican	Aida Nielsen	739	38.59
Democratic	Jeff Haylon	1,163	61.14
Write-in			
Total votes			

=== Rutland-10 ===
- Elects one representative.

General election

Rutland-10 general election, 2026
Party	Candidate	Votes	%
Republican	Bill Canfield (incumbent)		
Write-in			
Total votes			

=== Rutland-11 ===
- Elects one representative.

General election

Rutland-11 general election, 2026
Party	Candidate	Votes	%
Republican	Valorie Taylor (incumbent)		
Write-in			
Total votes			

=== Rutland-Bennington ===
- Elects one representative.

General election

Rutland-Bennington general election, 2026
Party	Candidate	Votes	%
Republican	Chris Pritchard (incumbent)		
Democratic	Jessica Van Oort		
Write-in			
Total votes			

=== Rutland-Windsor ===
- Elects one representative

General election

Rutland-Windsor general election, 2026
Party	Candidate	Votes	%
Republican	Kevin Winter (incumbent)		
Democratic	Phoebe Tucker		
Write-in			
Total votes			

=== Washington-1 ===
- Elects two representatives.

General election

Washington-1 general election, 2026
Party	Candidate	Votes	%
Republican	Kenneth Goslant (incumbent)		
Republican	Lucas Herring		
Write-in			
Total votes			

=== Washington-2 ===
- Elects two representatives.

General election

Washington-2 general election, 2026
Party	Candidate	Votes	%
Democratic	Candice White (incumbent)		
Democratic	Dara Torre (incumbent)		
Write-in			
Total votes			

=== Washington-3 ===
- Elects two representatives.

General election

Washington-3 general election, 2026
Party	Candidate	Votes	%
Republican	Michael Boutin (incumbent)		
Democratic	Teddy Waszazak (incumbent)		
Democratic	Sonya Spaulding		
Republican	John Santorello		
Write-in			
Total votes			

=== Washington-4 ===
- Elects two representatives.

General election

Washington-4 general election, 2026
Party	Candidate	Votes	%
Democratic	Kate McCann (incumbent)		
Democratic	Jared Duval		
Write-in			
Total votes			

=== Washington-5 ===
- Elects one representative.

General election

Washington-5 general election, 2026
Party	Candidate	Votes	%
Democratic	Ela Chapin (incumbent)		
Write-in			
Total votes			

=== Washington-6 ===
- Elects one representative.

General election

Washington-6 general election, 2026
Party	Candidate	Votes	%
Democratic	Marc Mihaly (incumbent)		
Write-in			
Total votes			

=== Washington-Chittenden ===
- Elects two representatives.

General election

Washington-Chittenden general election, 2026
Party	Candidate	Votes	%
Democratic	Theresa Wood (incumbent)		
Democratic	Katarina Lisaius		
Write-in			
Total votes			

=== Washington-Orange ===
- Elects two representatives.

General election

Washington-Orange general election, 2026
Party	Candidate	Votes	%
Republican	Gina Galfetti (incumbent)		
Republican	David Soucy (incumbent)		
Democratic	Melissa Battah		
Democratic	Emily Wheeler-Reynolds		
Write-in			
Total votes			

=== Windham-1 ===
- Elects one representative.

General election

Windham-1 general election, 2026
Party	Candidate	Votes	%
Democratic	Zon Eastes (incumbent)		
Republican	Nancy Gassett		
Write-in			
Total votes			

=== Windham-2 ===
- Elects one representative.

General election

Windham-2 general election, 2026
Party	Candidate	Votes	%
Independent	Laura Sibilia (incumbent)		
Write-in			
Total votes			

=== Windham-3 ===
- Elects two representatives.

General election

Windham-3 general election, 2026
Party	Candidate	Votes	%
Democratic	Michelle Bos-Lun (incumbent)		
Democratic	Chris Lundberg		
Republican	Nicole Cota		
Republican	Ryan Coyne		
Write-in			
Total votes			

=== Windham-4 ===
- Elects one representative.

General election

Windham-4 general election, 2026
Party	Candidate	Votes	%
Democratic	Mike Mrowicki (incumbent)		
Republican	Lynne Wilkins		
Independent	Ian Diamondstone		
Write-in			
Total votes			

=== Windham-5 ===
- Elects one representative.

General election

Windham-5 general election, 2026
Party	Candidate	Votes	%
Democratic	Emily Long (incumbent)		
Write-in			
Total votes			

=== Windham-6 ===
- Elects one representative.

General election

Windham-6 general election, 2026
Party	Candidate	Votes	%
Democratic	Emily Carris-Duncan (incumbent)		
Write-in			
Total votes			

=== Windham-7 ===
- Elects one representative.

General election

Windham-7 general election, 2026
Party	Candidate	Votes	%
Democratic	Emilie Kornheiser (incumbent)		
Republican	Aaron Smith		
Write-in			
Total votes			

=== Windham-8 ===
- Elects one representative.

General election

Windham-8 general election, 2026
Party	Candidate	Votes	%
Democratic	Daniel Quipp		
Republican	Bill Harvey		
Write-in			
Total votes			

=== Windham-9 ===
- Elects one representative.

General election

Windham-9 general election, 2026
Party	Candidate	Votes	%
Democratic	Ian Goodnow (incumbent)		
Write-in			
Total votes			

=== Windham-Windsor-Bennington ===
- Elects one representative.

General election

Windham-Windsor-Bennington general election, 2026
Party	Candidate	Votes	%
Democratic	Chris Morrow (incumbent)		
Republican	E. Coleman		
Write-in			
Total votes			

=== Windsor-1 ===
- Elects two representatives.

General election

Windsor-1 general election, 2026
Party	Candidate	Votes	%
Democratic	John Tansey		
Democratic	Dylan Morse		
Independent	Rich Thomas		
Write-in			
Total votes			

=== Windsor-2 ===
- Elects one representative.

General election

Windsor-2 general election, 2026
Party	Candidate	Votes	%
Republican	VL Coffin (incumbent)		
Democratic	Mark Yuengling		
Write-in			
Total votes			

=== Windsor-3 ===
- Elects one representative.

General election

Windsor-3 general election, 2026
Party	Candidate	Votes	%
Democratic	Kristi Morris (incumbent)		
Democratic	Alice Emmons (incumbent)		
Republican	Randy Gray		
Republican	Judith Stern		
Write-in			
Total votes			

=== Windsor-4 ===
- Elects one representative.

General election

Windsor-4 general election, 2026
Party	Candidate	Votes	%
Democratic	Michael Hoyt (incumbent)		
Independent	Justin Schoville		
Independent	Kyle Hansen		
Write-in			
Total votes			

=== Windsor-5 ===
- Elects one representative.

General election

Windsor-5 general election, 2026
Party	Candidate	Votes	%
Democratic	Charlie Kimbell (incumbent)		
Write-in			
Total votes			

=== Windsor-6 ===
- Elects two representatives.

General election

Windsor-6 general election, 2026
Party	Candidate	Votes	%
Democratic	Alanna Ojibway		
Democratic	Jimmy Coleman		
Write-in			
Total votes			

=== Windsor-Addison ===
- Elects one representative.

General election

Windsor-Addison Democratic primary, 2024
Party	Candidate	Votes	%
Democratic	Kirk White (incumbent)		
Republican	Michael White		
Write-in			
Total votes			

=== Windsor-Orange-1 ===
- Elects one representative.

General election

Windsor-Orange-1 general election, 2026
Party	Candidate	Votes	%
Democratic	John O'Brien (incumbent)		
Republican	Bruce Post		
Write-in			
Total votes			

=== Windsor-Orange-2 ===
- Elects two representatives.

General election

Windsor-Orange-2 general election, 2026
Party	Candidate	Votes	%
Democratic	Dee Gish		
Democratic	Lauren Rhim		
Write-in			
Total votes			

=== Windsor-Windham ===
- Elects one representative.

General election

Windsor-Windham general election, 2026
Party	Candidate	Votes	%
Republican	Thomas Charlton (incumbent)		
Democratic	Will Hoser		
Write-in			
Total votes			
