= Krasnow =

Krasnow is a surname. Notable people with the surname include:

- Alyaksandr Krasnow (born 1998), Belarusian footballer
- Bob Krasnow (1934–2016), American record label executive and entrepreneur
- Emilie Krasnow, American politician from Vermont
- Gerry Krasnow, American politician from Vermont
- Hecky Krasnow (1910–1984), American record producer
- Iris Krasnow (born 1954), American author, professor, and public speaker
- Michael Krasnow (1969–1997), American author
- Peter Krasnow (1886–1979), Ukrainian-born American painter
