= Jarrod Sammis =

American politician (born 1990)

Member of the Vermont House of Representatives for Rutland-3
- In office January 4, 2023 – January 8, 2025
- Preceded by: Robert Helm
- Succeeded by: Chris Brown (elect); Zachary Harvey

Personal details
- Born: July 2, 1990 (age 36) Middlebury, Vermont, U.S.
- Party: Libertarian (since 2023); Republican (until 2023)
- Education: Castleton State College (BS)

Jarrod E. Sammis (born July 2, 1990) is an American politician who served in the Vermont House of Representatives from 2023 to 2025, representing the Rutland-3 district, which includes Castleton. Initially elected as a member of the Republican Party, he switched to the Libertarian Party in May 2023, becoming the sole Libertarian Party legislator in the entire United States during his term.

== Early life and Accomplishments ==
Jarrod Sammis was born in in Middlebury, Vermont, and grew up in Ticonderoga, New York.

While a student in Ticonderoga, Sammis was a member of the New York State Public High School Athletic Association (NYSPHAA) Section 7 champion cross-country team 2005, 2006, and 2007. Sammis received the NYSPHAA Scholar-Athlete Award in 2007 for his accomplishments and high academic marks as a student athlete. Sammis also helped found the Ticonderoga High School chapter of Future Business Leaders of America (2007), and later served as student delegate to the Hugh O'Brian Youth Leadership Foundation (2007).

Sammis moved from Ticonderoga to Fair Haven, Vermont in 2008 - where he was later inducted into the National Honor Society, graduating in 2009.

After attending from Fair Haven Union High School, he moved to Castleton, Vermont, where he began attending Castleton State College (now Castleton University) in 2009, where he pursued a bachelor's degree in communications, public relations, and political science.

Sammis later went on to help found the Castleton State College chapter of Students Against Destructive Decisions. He was a frequent volunteer for the Castleton "Safe Ride" drunk driving prevention shuttle program, and was a radio host for the campus station station 91.3 WIUV. He was also a volunteer for the Castleton Polling Institute. Sammis later worked as a student activist, petitioning for fair Student Government Association elections.

Sammis graduated from Castleton State College in 2013.

After graduation, Sammis worked across multiple fields, ranging from substance abuse prevention, environmental conservation, microprocessor manufacturing (IBM, GlobalFoundries), and aerospace manufacturing (GE Aviation). Sammis also previously worked with the Radio Vermont group via the now-defunct WEXP 101.5 "The Fox" FM under Ken Squier.

Sammis later became a realtor in New York State in 2022 while running for election to the Vermont General Assembly the same year.

== Political career ==
Sammis ran for the Vermont House of Representatives as a member of the Republican Party in the 2022 election, running in the Rutland-3 district. He was recruited by Robert Helm, the district's retiring representative.

A self-identified libertarian who had previously been a volunteer for Gary Johnson's 2016 presidential campaign, Sammis campaigned on multiple key issues: protecting Vermont's education system, improving substance abuse and mental health programs, addressing the housing crisis, expanding access to childcare, preserving civil liberties, protecting LGTBQ rights, and addressing a shrinking Vermont population. He also addressed trying to improve living affordability for Vermont, and was opposed to a proposed carbon tax.

Sammis's opponent was Democratic nominee Mary Droege, a lecturer at Castleton University and the chair of the Castleton Democratic Committee, who campaigned primarily on environmental issues.

Sammis later declined to attend an October 2022 candidate forum presented by Castleton University due to affiliations between Droege and the University, along with the refusal of the University to provide questions in advance to prevent bias. The University proceeded to host the event without Sammis and did not notify the public that he would not be attending. The event held approximately 40 attendees and lasted less than an hour.

Sammis was later elected to the state house, receiving 835 votes to Droege's 793.

=== Political positions and Accomplishments ===
During his tenure, Sammis voted against the Affordable Heat Act, a bill which put an additional tax on heating fuels in Vermont. He also opposed the merger of Castleton University, Northern Vermont University, and Vermont Technical College into a single university, Vermont State University.

According to the Vermont Daily Chronicle, Sammis was a "strong defender of Libraries of the Vermont State College System, and has worked to keep herbicides out of Lake Bomoseen". Sammis was also described as "a strong advocate of programs promoting substance abuse recovery."

Sammis was a member of the House Committee on Commerce and Economic Development, where he contributed to projects such as escrow deposit bonds, workers compensation, and workforce development.

Sammis also submitted/supported bills that included: legislative and executive term limits, employment protections for volunteer firefighters and emergency medical personnel, expanding workers’ compensation coverage for firefighters with cancer, the creating the Vermont Office of Film and Creative Media, expanding apprenticeship and other workforce opportunities, and creating an income tax exemption for all retired military and military survivor benefit income.

Sammis later submitted a House concurrent resolution in memory of former Castleton State College Dean of Education Honoree Fleming, deceased wife of author and Castleton resident Ron Powers. The resolution passed as Act R-232, and is now on permanent display at the Honoree Flemming Memorial in Jeffords Hall at the Vermont State University Castleton Campus.

Sammis also endorsed the creation of "Ken Squier Day" in memory of his former employer from the Radio Vermont Group.

In May 2023, Sammis was invited as a legislative guest to the New York State Assembly by Assembly Member Matt Simpson (New York politician). Simpson later described how "Jarrod has worked and volunteered with many groups across our lovely states," later highlighting Sammis's diversity across various fields, organizations, and nonprofits. Simpson later described how Sammis's "family roots flow between Vermont and upstate New York, particularly Ticonderoga."

=== Party switch ===
At a press conference on May 3, 2023, Sammis announced he was officially switching to the Libertarian Party, becoming the only Libertarian state legislator in the entirety of the United States, and the first Libertarian member of the Vermont Legislature since Neil Randall, who was elected to the state house as a Libertarian in 1998 and left the party in 2000. Sammis's switch was supported by high-ranking members of the Libertarian Party of Vermont and the Libertarian National Committee. He also distanced himself from the Mises Caucus, a prominent group within the Libertarian Party.

The switch was criticized by state Republican officials, which Sammis later dismissed as a "compliment".

During the press conference for this party switch, Sammis stated his intention of introducing a bill referred to as "Defend the Guard", which would "forbid the Vermont National Guard from being deployed overseas without a formal federal declaration of war".

=== After Office and Other Projects ===
In 2024, Sammis chose not to run for re-election, returning to work full time in real estate and marketing. Sammis continues to remain active in volunteer work with organizations such as the Ticonderoga Hometown Heroes Banners program.

In addition to his regular and volunteer work, Sammis went on to co-found the paranormal investigation group "Green Mountain Ghost Society", and was later featured in the documentary "Ghosts & Poltergeist: Secrets from the Other Side (2025)" by John Elden Gibbons.
