= Robert Spain =

Robert Spain may refer to:

- Robert Hitchcock Spain (1925–2022), American bishop of the United Methodist Church
- Robert Spain (politician), American businessman and politician from Vermont
