= Mattheis =

Mattheis is a surname. Notable people with the surname include:

- Andreas Mattheis (born 1954), Brazilian retired automobile racing driver
- Emery Mattheis, American politician
- Fiorella Mattheis (born 1988), Brazilian actress, model, television presenter and entrepreneur
- Hilde Mattheis (born 1954), German politician
- Petra Mattheis (born 1967), German artist und photographer
