= Lucy Rogers (politician) =

American politician

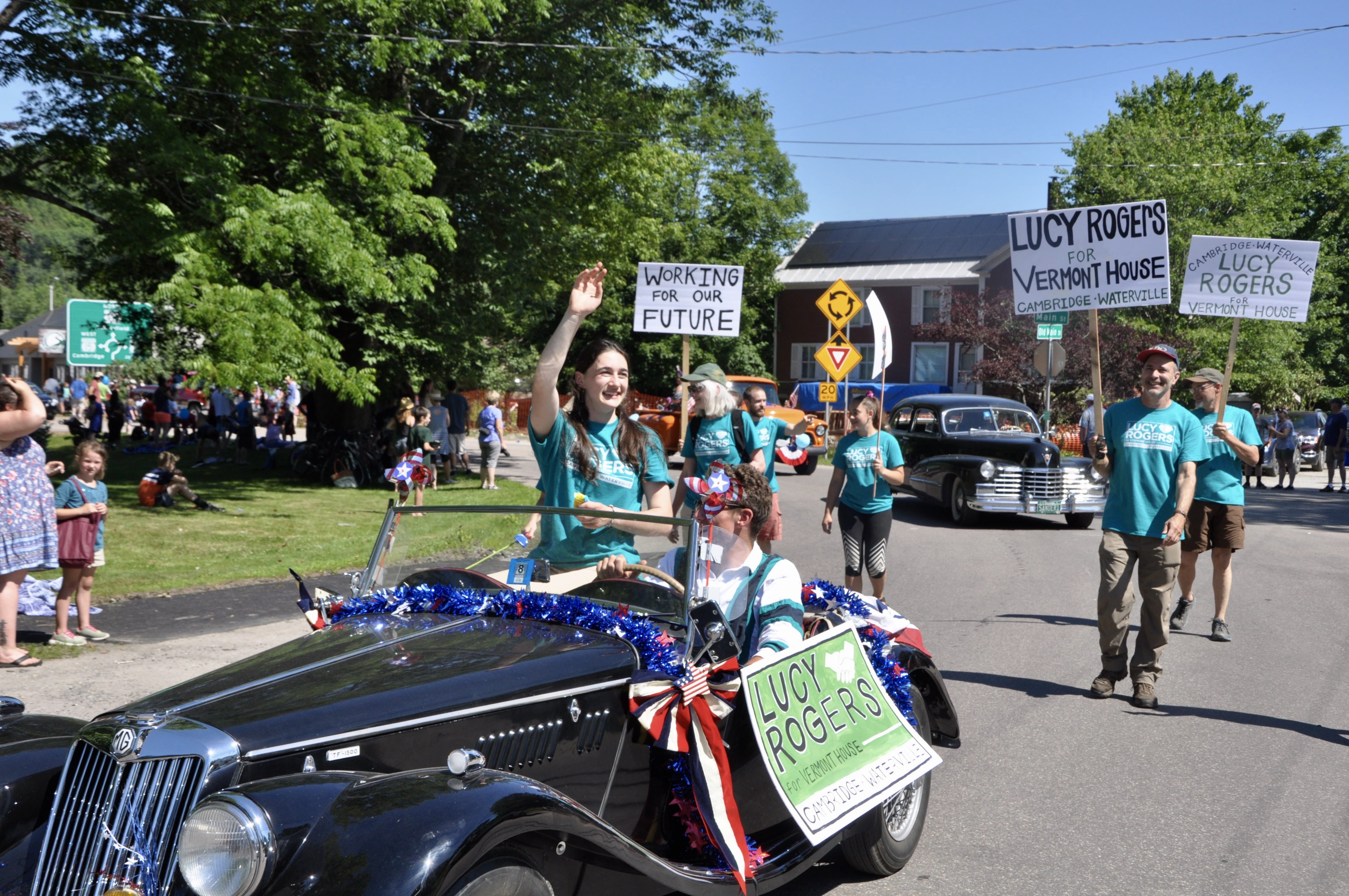
- Lucy Rogers in parade

Member of the Vermont House of Representatives for Lamoille District 3
- In office January 9, 2019 – January 4, 2023
- Preceded by: Bernie Juskiewicz
- Succeeded by: Lucy Boyden

Personal details
- Born: Lucy E. Rogers Waterville, Vermont, U.S.
- Party: Democratic
- Education: Lamoille Union High School
- Alma mater: University of Vermont (BA)

Lucy E. Rogers is an American politician who served in the Vermont House of Representatives from 2019 to 2023. A member of the Democratic Party, she represented Lamoille County for two terms.

Rogers served on the House Committee on Health Care and on the Canvassing Committee.

== Career ==
Rogers was 23 years old and had just graduated from the University of Vermont when she won her first election in 2018 for an open Vermont State House seat represented by Republican Representative Bernie Juskiewicz, who was retiring at the end of his term. Her campaign made national news when she played a duet with her opponent, Republican Zac Mayo.

After winning reelection in 2020, she decided against running for a third term in 2022 and was succeeded by fellow Democrat Lucy Boyden.
