= Amanda Cochrane =

American Politician

- Cochrane in 2026

Member-elect of the Vermont House of Representatives from the Caledonia-Essex district
- Incumbent
- Assumed office January 6, 2027
- Preceding: Scott Campbell

Personal details
- Born: December 18, 1979 (age 46) Arlington, Massachusetts
- Party: Democratic
- Spouse: John Raser (m. 2004)
- Children: 3
- Education: Colby College (BA), Brandeis University (MBA)
- Website: www.cochrane-for-vermont.com

Amanda Elizabeth Cochrane (born December 18, 1979) is an American politician who is the Vermont State Representative-elect from the Caledonia-Essex district. A member of the Democratic Party, Cochrane was elected in 2026 alongside Republican incumbent Deborah Dolgin. She currently serves as the executive director of Umbrella, a nonprofit that supports survivors of domestic and sexual violence in Vermont's Northeast Kingdom.

== Career ==
Cochrane is a graduate of Colby College and received an MBA from the Heller School for Social Policy and Management at Brandeis University. She began her non-profit career at WISE, a domestic and sexual violence nonprofit operating in the Upper Connecticut River Valley of Vermont and New Hampshire, and later served as associate director of foundation relations at The Home for Little Wanderers. She went on to work at the community development corporations Groundwork Lawrence and Groundwork USA before taking her current job at Umbrella. Cochrane previously ran for Vermont Senate in 2024, but was defeated by Republican Scott Beck.
