= Judy Harrow =

Author, counselor, lecturer, and Wiccan priestess

Judy Harrow (March 3, 1945 – March 20, 2014) was an American author, counselor, lecturer, and Wiccan priestess.

Born Judith Harrow in the Bronx, she lived most of her life in New York City, only later moving to northern New Jersey.

== Education ==
Harrow graduated from Bronx High School of Science in 1962, earning a B.A. in American government from Western College for Women in 1966. She participated in the La Jolla program in group facilitation in 1977. Harrow graduated with honors from City College of New York Graduate School of Education with a M.S. in counseling in 1979.

== Mainstream counseling work ==
Judy Harrow was a member of the Association for Humanistic Psychology and the American Counseling Association (ACA). Within the ACA, she was affiliated with the special interest divisions Association for Spiritual, Ethical and Religious Values in Counseling (ASERVIC), Association for Specialists in Group Work (ASGW), and International Association of Marriage and Family Counselors (IAMFC). Harrow served as the President of New Jersey ASERVIC, and on the Book Review Board of the Family Journal, a publication of IAMFC.

Harrow served as a member of the National Advisory Board of the Consultation on Multifaith Education. She was also a member of the steering committee of the Interfaith Council of Greater New York. She managed the Council's email list and acted as their liaison with the United Religions Initiative. She served as the Council's Program Coordinator in 1996 and 1997.

The Counselors for Social Justice (CSJ) division of ACA honored Harrow posthumously in 2015.

== Neopaganism ==
Harrow began studying Witchcraft in 1976, and was initiated as a Priestess in September 1977. She founded the Inwood Study Group in June 1980. After Harrow received her third degree Gardnerian initiation in November 1980, this group became Proteus Coven, which thereafter affiliated with Covenant of the Goddess in August 1981. She served as convening First Officer of Northeast Local Council of CoG in 1983, National First Officer of CoG in 1984, and Co-chair of CoG Grand Council in 1985. She has held various other positions on the CoG National and Local Boards of Directors, most recently National Public Information Officer from 1993-1995. In January 1985, Harrow became the first member of CoG to be legally registered as clergy in New York City, after a five-year effort requiring the assistance of the New York Civil Liberties Union.

She founded the Pagan Pastoral Counseling Network in 1982, and served as the first editor of the Network's publication. She co-created a workshop series on Basic Counseling Skills for Coven Leaders, which has successfully run many times. This grew into a series of intensive workshops for Pagan elders on a range of topics. Harrow also founded the New York Area Coven Leaders' Peer Support Group. She served as Program Coordinator for the first Mid-Atlantic Pan Pagan Conference and Festival and for seven other Pagan gatherings.

Harrow was among the founding faculty of Cherry Hill Seminary, serving as the Chair of the Pastoral Counseling Department. Cherry Hill Seminary named its library in honor of Harrow in June 2009.

For two years, Harrow produced Reconnections, a weekly feature on the activities of religious progressives of all faiths, for WBAI radio in New York.

Harrow contributed two essays to Modern Rites of Passage (Book 2 in the "Witchcraft Today" anthology series), and one to the anthology Magical Religion and Modern Witchcraft, published in 1996 by SUNY Press. One of these essays has since been reprinted in The Paganism Reader (Routledge, 2004). She has also written for AHP Perspective (the Newsletter of the Association for Humanistic Psychology), Counseling and Values (the Journal of the Association for Spiritual, Ethical and Religious Values in Counseling), Gnosis, and such small Pagan publications as Dayshift, Harvest, and the CoG Newsletter. Harrow was a regular contributor to PanGaia, writing the "Mind and Magic" column.

In addition to her books Wicca Covens (1999) and Spiritual Mentoring (2002), Harrow edited (and contributed to) Devoted to You: Honoring Deity in Wiccan Practice (2003) and coordinated the 50th-anniversary reissue of Witchcraft Today by Gerald Gardner in 2004.

== Works ==
- 1999: Wicca Covens. Citadel Press ISBN 0-8065-2035-3
- 2002: Spiritual Mentoring: A Pagan Guide. ECW Press ISBN 1-55022-519-7
- 2003: Devoted to You: Honoring Deity in Wiccan Practice. Citadel Press ISBN 0-8065-2392-1
