= Emery Mattheis =

Vermont politician

- Mattheis in 2026

Member of the Vermont House of Representatives from the Orange-Washington-Addison district
- Incumbent
- Assumed office January 2027 Serving with Larry Satcowitz
- Preceded by: Jay Hooper

Personal details
- Party: Democratic
- Education: Warren Wilson College (BA), Vermont Law School (J.D.)

Emery Mattheis (born 1993) is an American politician elected to the Vermont's House of Representatives as a Progressive Democrat representing the Orange-Washington-Addison district in 2026.

== Early life and education ==
Mattheis grew up in Indiana and graduated from Warren Wilson College. He moved to Vermont in 2017 to attend Vermont Law School where he studied environmental law. He interned at the Montpelier law firm Tarrant, Gillies, and Richardson and became interested in public service.

== Career ==
After completing his JD in 2020, Mattheis began working for the town of Randolph, Vermont, first as its zoning assistant and administrative assistant. He ran unopposed for Town Clerk and Treasurer of Randolph, Vermont in 2021 and was elected to both positions, working in them for three years. He was elected to Randolph's Selectboard in March 2026. In November 2026 Mattheis was elected to the Vermont House of Representatives representing the Orange-Washington-Addison district running on a platform of "people over profits".
