= Paul Clifford (politician) =

American politician from Vermont

Member of the Vermont House of Representatives from the Rutland 4 district
- In office January 4, 2023 – January 8, 2025
- Preceded by: Thomas Terenzini
- Succeeded by: Christopher Howland

Personal details
- Born: Rutland, Vermont
- Party: Republican

Paul Clifford is an American politician from Vermont. He was a Republican member of the Vermont House of Representatives for the Rutland 4 district from 2023 to 2025.
