= David Tucker (politician) =

American politician

Member-elect of the Vermont House of Representatives from the Caledonia 1 district
- Assuming office January 2027
- Succeeding: Debra Powers

Personal details
- Party: Democratic
- Education: Goddard College; Harvard Kennedy School

David Tucker is an American politician. A member of the Democratic Party, he is the member-elect for the Caledonia 1 of the Vermont House of Representatives.

Tucker attended the Goddard College, earning his bachelor's degree in 1974. He also attended Harvard Kennedy School, earning his Master of Public Administration degree in 1987.
