= Dave Templeman =

American politician from Vermont

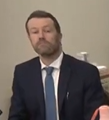
- Templeman in 2024

Member of the Vermont House of Representatives from the Orleans 3 district
- In office January 4, 2023 – January 8, 2025
- Succeeded by: Ken Wells

Personal details
- Born: San Francisco, California
- Party: Democratic
- David Templeman's voice David Templeman introducing himself in a meeting of the Senate Agricultural committee Recorded February 21, 2024

David (Dave) Templeman is an American politician from Vermont. He was a Democratic member of the Vermont House of Representatives for the Orleans 3 District from 2023 to 2025.
