= Paul Ralston =

American politician

Member of the Vermont House of Representatives from the Addison 1 district
- In office January 5, 2011 – January 5, 2015
- Preceded by: Steven Maier
- Succeeded by: Amy Sheldon

Personal details
- Party: Democratic
- Education: Trinity College (BS)

Paul D. Ralston is a former Democratic member of the Vermont House of Representatives, representing Vermont House of Representatives Addison—1 District from 2010 to 2015. Ralston did not seek re-election in 2014.

== Biography ==
Ralston studied agricultural engineering at the University of Vermont and earned a B.S. in business administration from Trinity College.

He is a small business owner, and has owned Vermont Coffee Company since 2001. The company's organic, fair-trade coffee beans are sold to accounts ranging from small, highly regarded New York City coffee shops to Costco. Ralston, who is the sole owner, has not publicized sales figures but Vermont Coffee Company projects 20 percent growth in 2014.

He is also the founder and CEO of Vermont Sweet Maple.

He previously worked as a Marketing General Manager for the Body Shop in England, and the Marketing Manager and President of Autumn Harp.

He has served on the boards of Vermont Public Interest Research Group (VPIRG), Vermont Businesses for Social Responsibility (VBSR, President), Vermont Family Forests, Addison County Democrats (Treasurer), and Addison County Chamber of Commerce. He also runs a Vermont-based economic develop PAC, Vision to Action Vermont (V2AVT).

== Committee assignments ==
=== 2013-2014 ===
At the beginning of the 2013 legislative session, Ralston served on the following committees:

- Commerce and Economic Development

=== 2011-2012 ===
In the 2011-2012 legislative session, Ralston did not serve on any committees.

== Elections ==
=== 2012 ===
Ralston won re-election in the 2012 election for Vermont House of Representatives—Addison 1. Ralston was unopposed in the August 28 Democratic primary and was unopposed in the general election, which took place on November 6, 2012.

=== 2010 ===
Ralston won election to the Vermont House of Representatives—Addison 1 in 2010. Incumbent Steven Maier ran in the Democratic primary on August 24, 2010, but later withdrew from the race. Ralston was selected to replace him on the ticket. He was unopposed in the November 2, 2010 general election.

Election results
Year	Election	Candidate	Party	Votes	%	Opponent	Party	Votes	%
2012	Vermont House of Representatives	Paul Raulston	Democratic	2,378	47.76%	Betty Nuovo	Democratic	2,601	52.24%
2010	Vermont House of Representatives	Paul Raulston	Democratic	1,903	47.84%	Betty Nuovo	Democratic	2,075	52.16%

== Endorsements ==
Ralston has received endorsements from numerous political, environmental, and development groups, including the Vermont Sierra Club, Planned Parenthood of Northern New England, Vermont League of Conservation Voters, and the Vermont State Employees' Association.

== Voting record ==
=== 2011-2012 ===
The Ethan Allen Institute, a Vermont-based free-market public policy research and education organization, released its biennial publication, the Vermont Voters' Report Card, for the years 2011-2012. The report showed how Vermont legislators in the state House and state Senate voted on key issues important to the Institute. Here's how Ralston voted on the selected bills:

Vermont Voters Scorecard, 2011-2012
Health Provider Tax	Green Mountain Care	Education Taxation	Green Mountain Care	Property Rate Tax	Health Exchange	Green Mountain Care	Renewable Portfolio	CVPS Rebate
N	N	N	Y	Y	Y	N	Y	N

=== Noteworthy issues ===
- May 1, 2013: Paul Ralston voted Nay (Passage With Amendment) - S 77 - Prohibits Liability for Self-Administered Lethal Dosages
- February 2, 2013: Paul Ralston voted Yea (Passage) - H 265 - Amends Education Property Tax Rates for Fiscal Year 2014
- May 4, 2012: Paul Ralston voted Yea (Conference Report Vote) - H 464 - Prohibits Hydraulic Fracturing
- February 24, 2012: Paul Ralston did not vote - H 559 - Establishes a Health Benefit Exchange
- May 6, 2011: Paul Ralston voted Yea (Conference Report Vote) - H 436 - Tax Law Amendments
- May 5, 2011: Paul Ralston voted Yea (Passage With Amendment) - S 17 - Medical Marijuana
- May 5, 2011: Paul Ralston voted Yea (Conference Report Vote) - H 202 - Single-Payer and Unified Health System
- March 24, 2011: Paul Ralston voted Yea (Passage) - H 202 - Single-Payer and Unified Health System

== Personal ==
Ralston is married. He is also the CEO and Co-founder of the Vermont Coffee Company.

== See also ==
- Vermont State Legislature
- Vermont House of Representatives
- Vermont House Committees
- Vermont Joint Committees
- Vermont House of Representatives districts, 2002–12
