= Vyhovsky =

Vyhovsky is a surname. Notable people with the surname include:

- Ivan Vyhovsky (died 1664), Cossack hetman
- Tanya Vyhovsky (fl. 2020s), American politician from Vermont
