= Trinity College of Vermont =

Defunct Catholic college in Burlington, Vermont, U.S.

Coordinates: 44.4829838°N 73.1933579°W

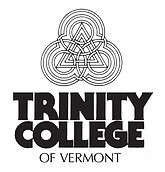
- Type: Private college
- Active: 1925; 101 years ago–2000; 26 years ago
- Location: Burlington, Vermont, U.S.
- Campus: 21 acres (8.5 ha)
- Website: www.tcvt.net (defunct)

Trinity College of Vermont was a Catholic women's college located in Burlington, Vermont, United States. It was founded in September 1925 and closed in 2000.

Trinity was founded by the Sisters of Mercy of Vermont as New England's second Catholic women's college. The college was opened to provide an education to women, who at the time were an underserved population in the state of Vermont. The earliest students were taught in the areas of English, French, religion, mathematics, business skills, and the classics. Trinity College of Vermont was a pioneer in education and community service and promoted a mission of social justice.

It closed in 2000 due to financial constraints, after which the University of Vermont purchased its campus. By the time of its closing, 5,000 students had been educated at Trinity.

After the college's closing, Trinity's graduate-level programs moved to the Vermont Center at Southern New Hampshire University in Colchester, where they continued to be directed by former Trinity administrators. Business classes were moved to the newly formed Mercy Connections in Burlington, where the Women's Small Business Program continues to offer entrepreneurial classes and support to women today.

== Notable alumni ==
- David E. Demag, US Marshal for Vermont
- Johannah Leddy Donovan, longtime member of the Vermont House of Representatives
- Paul Ralston, businessman and member of the Vermont House of Representatives
- Mary Sullivan, member of the Vermont House of Representatives
- Mari Tomasi, novelist

== See also ==
- List of colleges and universities in Vermont
- List of current and historical women's universities and colleges
