= Mari Cordes =

American politician and former member of the Vermont State House of Representatives

Member of the Vermont House of Representatives from the Addison 4 district
- In office January 2019 – July 4, 2025
- Succeeded by: Karen Lueders

Personal details
- Party: Democratic
- Other political affiliations: Progressive (until 2022)
- Children: 2
- Education: University of Michigan (BS); Vermont College of Fine Arts (ADN)

Mari Cordes is an American nurse and politician who served in the Vermont House of Representatives from 2019 until 2025.

Cordes worked as a nurse at the University of Vermont Medical Center. In June 2025, she announced she would resign her seat and move to Nova Scotia, Canada, due to increased homophobia in the United States, Social Security cuts, and staffing cuts for medical professionals.
