= Bernie Juskiewicz =

American politician (1943–2020)

Member of the Vermont House of Representatives from the Lamoille-3 district
- In office 2013 – January 9, 2019
- Preceded by: Mark Woodward (2011–2013)
- Succeeded by: Lucy Rogers

Personal details
- Born: April 6, 1943 Northampton, Massachusetts, U.S.
- Died: April 8, 2020 (aged 77) Montpelier, Vermont, U.S.
- Party: Republican
- Spouse: Suzan Juskiewicz
- Children: 3
- Education: College of Emporia
- Profession: accounting/management

Bernard Charles Juskiewicz Jr. (/ˈdʒʌskwɪts/ JUSS-kwits; April 6, 1943 – April 8, 2020) was an American politician in the state of Vermont. He was a member of the Vermont House of Representatives, who sat as a Republican from the Lamoille-3 district, after having been elected for the first time in 2012. Juskiewicz did not seek reelection in 2018. He also served on the Lamoille Union High School Board, the Cambridge Elementary School Board and the Cambridge Select Board.

== Biography ==
Juskiewicz was born in Northampton, Massachusetts, and graduated from Hopkins Academy in Hadley, Massachusetts. He completed his Bachelor of Arts degree in business administration from the College of Emporia in Kansas. In 1967, he married his wife, Suzan, with whom he had three children.

Juskiewicz began his career at IBM by working in the accounting and management departments at a company facility in East Fishkill, New York. In 1978, Juskiewicz and his family moved to Cambridge, Vermont, when was transferred to a new job at the IBM factory in Essex Junction.

In 2012, Juskiewicz, was elected to the Vermont House of Representatives from open Lamoille-3 seat, centered in Cambridge, as a Republican. He won re-election in 2014 and 2016, but declined to seek re-election in 2018. He was initially assigned to the state House Education Committee before later becoming a member of the Appropriations Committee.

Juskiewicz became a proponent of secondary education programs and a supporter of the University of Vermont during his tenure in the Vermont House. He helped establish a recovery center in Johnson, Vermont, called Jenna's House. Juskiewicz also advocated for funding for the USS Vermont, a United States Navy nuclear submarine. The new submarine was due to be commissioned in April 2020, but was delayed due to the ongoing COVID-19 pandemic. He retired from the state House in January 2019 and was succeeded by Democrat Lucy Rogers.

Juskiewicz died from COVID-19 on April 8, 2020, at the age of 77. Vermont Governor Phil Scott ordered flags to fly at half-staff in Juskiewicz's memory.
