= Thomas Terenzini =

American politician

Member of the Vermont House of Representatives from the Rutland 4 district
- In office January 9, 2013 – January 4, 2023
- Succeeded by: Paul Clifford

Personal details
- Party: Republican

Thomas Terenzini is an American politician. He represented the Rutland-4 district in the Vermont House of Representatives.
