= Janssen Willhoit =

American politician and member of the Vermont State House of Representatives

Member of the Vermont House of Representatives from the Caledonia 3 district
- In office January 7, 2015 – January 9, 2019
- Succeeded by: Scott Campbell

Personal details
- Born: Cynthiana, KY
- Party: Republican
- Children: 2
- Education: Eastern Kentucky University (BA) Vermont Law School (JD) George Washington University (MS)

Janssen Willhoit is an American politician who served in the Vermont House of Representatives from 2015 to 2019.
