= Lucy Boyden =

American politician (born 2000)

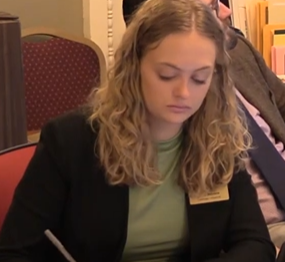
- Boyden in 2024

Member of the Vermont House of Representatives for Lamoille District 3
- Incumbent
- Assumed office January 4, 2023
- Preceded by: Lucy Rogers
- Succeeded by: Adam Howard (elect)

Personal details
- Born: Lucy M. Boyden; May 1, 2000 (age 26) Cambridge, Vermont, U.S.
- Party: Democratic
- Education: Lamoille Union High School
- Alma mater: Roger Williams University (BS)
- Website: lucyboydenvt.com

Lucy M. Boyden (/ˈbɔɪdən/ BOY-dən; born May 1, 2000) is an American politician serving as a member of the Vermont House of Representatives for Lamoille District 3, which encompasses Cambridge, Jeffersonville, and Waterville. She is a member of the Democratic Party. Boyden is among the youngest U.S. state legislators.

== Early life and education ==
Boyden was born May 1, 2000, in Cambridge, Vermont, to Mark and Lauri Anne Boyden. She is the fifth generation to grow up on the Boyden family farm founded in 1914. She has one older sister. She graduated from Lamoille Union High School in 2018 and summa cum laude with a Bachelor of Science in marketing from Roger Williams University in Bristol, Rhode Island.

== Career ==
During her formative years, Boyden worked as a stable hand on the family farm. After graduating from college, she worked in content management for Wex before becoming a state legislator.

== Politics ==
Boyden defeated Republican nominee Rebecca Pitre the general election on November 8, 2022, and took office on January 4, 2023.
