= Neil Randall =

American businessman and politician (1934–2011)

Neil O. Randall (August 18, 1934 – July 15, 2011) was an American businessman, politician and gun rights activist from Bradford, Vermont.

== Background and family life ==
Randall was born August 18, 1934, in Danville, Vermont and graduated from Danville School. He started and operated his own business, Randall's Dairy Equipment. He was married to Gloria, with whom he had three children. He died July 15, 2011; at the time of his death he was vice-president of Gun Owners of Vermont.

== Political career ==
In 1996 Randall was the Libertarian nominee for Governor of Vermont, losing to Howard Dean. Randall was elected to the Vermont House of Representatives' 3rd Orange County district in 1998, as a fusion candidate of the Republican and Libertarian parties. He left the Libertarian Party, and was re-elected as a Republican in 2000. He was again the Republican nominee in 2002, but lost to former Representative Democrat Wayne G. Kenyon, whom Randall had defeated in 1998 and 2000.

Randall was the last Libertarian state legislator in Vermont until 2023, when Republican state representative Jarrod Sammis switched to the Libertarian Party.
