= Wayne G. Kenyon =

American educator and politician (1933–2022)

Wayne George Kenyon (October 12, 1933 – November 7, 2022) was an American educator and politician from Bradford, Vermont, who served several terms as a Democratic member of the Vermont House of Representatives from Orange County between 1987 and 2004.

== Background ==
Kenyon was born in Woodsville, New Hampshire October 12, 1933. He graduated from Lyndon State College in 1955, and went into the United States Air Force in 1956, leaving in 1960. In 1965 he received an M.S. from Syracuse University. He worked as a high school teacher (teaching social studies and Russian language) and administrator, and in adult vocational education. He also worked as a consultant and administrator for the Vermont Department of Education.

Kenyon died on November 7, 2022, at the age of 89.

== Legislative service ==
Kenyon was first elected to the House in 1986 from Orange County's 3rd house district (Bradford, Corinth and Vershire) with 827 votes to 534 for Republican Warren S. Sweet. He was re-elected in 1988 and 1990, before being defeated in the 1992 general election by Republican Robert Spain (who drew 973 votes to Kenyon's 908) after a redistricting took Vershire out of the district; he failed to reverse that result in 1994, when the two faced each other once more; but in 1996, Kenyon reclaimed his seat from Spain, with 879 votes to Spain's 708. In 1998, Kenyon was unseated by Neil Randall, who was running as a Libertarian/Republican fusion candidate. Kenyon lost again in 2000 to Randall. In 2002, Bradford had been moved into a new 2nd Orange County district (Bradford, Fairlee and West Fairlee), and Kenyon defeated Randall with 858 votes to Randall's 642. In 2004, Kenyon was defeated in the Democratic primary by Sarah Copeland Hanzas.
