= Adam Howard (politician) =

American politician

Member-elect of the Vermont House of Representatives from the Lamoille-3 district
- Assuming office January 2027
- Succeeding: Lucy Boyden

Personal details
- Party: Independent

Adam Howard is an American politician. An independent, he is the member-elect for the Lamoille-3 district of the Vermont House of Representatives.
