= Fran Covey =

American politician

Member-elect of the Vermont House of Representatives from the Orange-3 district
- Assuming office January 6, 2027
- Succeeding: Joshua Dobrovich

Personal details
- Party: Republican

Fran Covey is an American politician. A member of the Republican Party, he is the member-elect for the Orange-3 district of the Vermont House of Representatives. He was elected unopposed in the 2026 election.
