= Marybeth Redmond =

American politician, educator, and writer

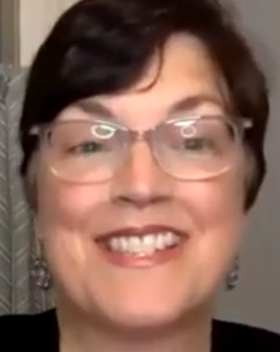
- Redmond in 2020

Member of the Vermont House of Representatives from the Chittenden 8-1 district
- In office January 9, 2019 – December 9, 2021
- Preceded by: Betsy Dunn
- Succeeded by: Rey Garofano

Personal details
- Party: Democratic
- Spouse: Mark Redmond
- Children: 1
- Education: University of Notre Dame (BA); Columbia University School of Journalism (MA)

Marybeth Redmond is an American politician who served as a member of the Vermont House of Representatives for the Chittenden 8-1 district from 2019 to 2022.

== Career ==
A member of the Democratic Party, Redmond served on the House Committee on Human Services, the Joint Legislative Child Protection Oversight Committee, and the Canvassing Committee.

Redmond also serves on the Vermont Commission on Women and as a partner with Vermont Story Lab. She has worked extensively with incarcerated women and other vulnerable women and communities. Described as a "progressive Catholic" by the National Catholic Reporter, Redmond was motivated to run in part to promote gun control. Redmond's stated legislative priorities included a livable wage, affordable housing and healthcare, equal pay for women, safe and vibrant public schools, human dignity for all people, and a healthy environment.

Redmond was named the 2020 Vermont Mother of the Year by American Mothers, Inc. Redmond resigned from the Vermont House in December 2021, citing health concerns.
