= Heather Chase =

American politician

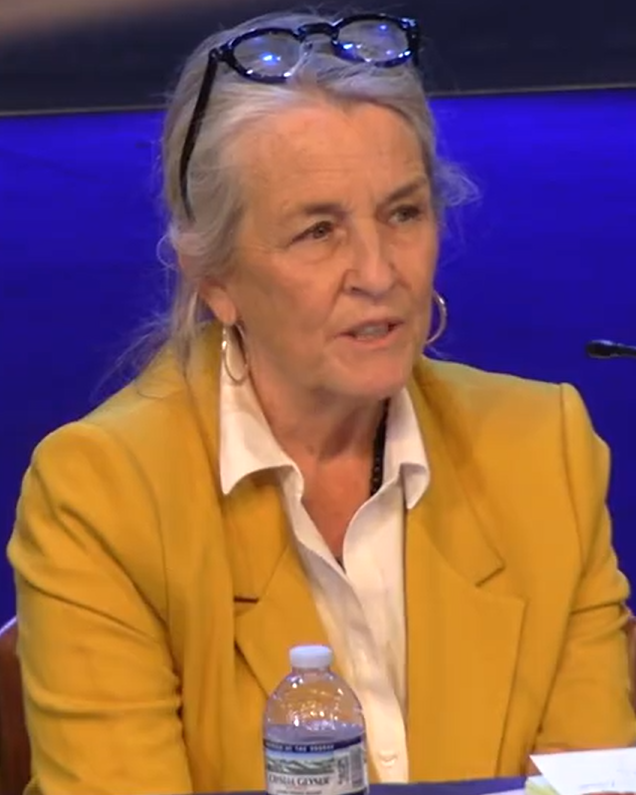
- Chase in 2026

Windsor-Windham Vermont Representative District
- Succeeded by: Thomas F. Charlton

Personal details
- Born: Canada
- Party: Democratic

Heather Chase is an American politician. She was the representative of the Windsor-Windham District of the Vermont House of Representatives. A Democrat, Chase won against Republican opponent Eva Ryan.

Chase is a small business owner, nurse and member of the Chester Select Board. She is the President and founder of Corporate Lactation Service, Inc. Chase has a Bachelor’s degree in nursing from Seattle University and from San Jose State University, a Master’s in Community Health.
