= Cherry Hill Seminary =

- Type: Private, Paganism
- Established: 1990s
- President: Holli Emore
- Location: Columbia, South Carolina, United States
- Campus: Distance
- Website: CherryHillSeminary.org

Cherry Hill Seminary provides higher education and practical training in modern pagan and nature spiritualities, offering the first graduate-level education for Pagan ministry in the world. Cherry Hill Seminary offers online distance-learning classes, regional workshops, and intensive retreats.

Cherry Hill Seminary is a nonprofit organization under the laws of the United States, offering master's-level degrees under authority of the state of South Carolina, with a business office located in Columbia.

== History ==
The seminary was founded in the early 1990s by Kirk White, Cat Chapin-Bishop, and Laura Wildman-Hanlon of Vermont's Church of the Sacred Earth. Classes were conducted first by mail, then brought online in 2000.

White recruited nonprofit consultant and Cherry Hill Seminary student Holli Emore to serve as the chair of the first working board of directors, which began meeting in January 2007. The seminary was granted tax-exempt status by the Internal Revenue Service in March 2007. By the end of that year, Emore became the seminary’s first executive director, and the seminary relocated its business operations and incorporation to South Carolina.

Cherry Hill named its library in honor of longtime faculty member Judy Harrow in June 2009. The master's program was announced the next month. In fall 2010, 38 students were matriculated into either a master's or a certificate program, and many more enrolled in courses outside the formal programs.

Cherry Hill Seminary granted its first Master of Divinity degree in Pagan pastoral counseling to Sandra Lee Harris of Sacred Well Congregation in May 2012. Evidence of that degree was submitted to the Association of Professional Chaplains as part of the recipient's application for evaluation of theological equivalency by the Board of Chaplaincy Certification, Inc. in lieu of a graduate degree from an accredited seminary. BCCI notified the recipient in November 2012 that her educational credentials had been accepted.

== Academic standing ==
Cherry Hill Seminary has been granted an official religious exemption from South Carolina requirements for educational institutions, meaning it can legally grant Master of Divinity degrees. This degree is not accredited.

Cherry Hill Seminary is unaccredited.

== Programs ==
Courses include topics in ethics, religious history, ministry, leadership, chaplaincy, ritual, spirituality and formation, social justice, and more. Registered students receive access to an online classroom for course content, discussion and assignments. Most courses hold live meetings on Skype.

Master's degrees include: Master of Pagan Studies and Master of Divinity, with areas of focus corresponding to the Department of Ministry, Advocacy and Leadership; Department of Pagan Pastoral Counseling and Chaplaincy; and Department of Theology and Religious History.

"Insights" short courses are for anyone in the public and last only four weeks, addressing specific topics, often on popular subjects or a particular skill.

The Seminary is gradually adding self-directed asynchronous short courses.

Pagan Life Academy is a series of eight print lessons (not correspondence) developed especially for incarcerated Pagans and ministers working with Pagans in correctional facilities.

The Community Ministry Certificate is a non-professional 15-month asynchronous self-study with an assigned faculty mentor for non-professionals serving their communities. The first CMC graduates were awarded their certificates in spring of 2018.
