= Mitzi Johnson =

Vermont politician (born 1970)

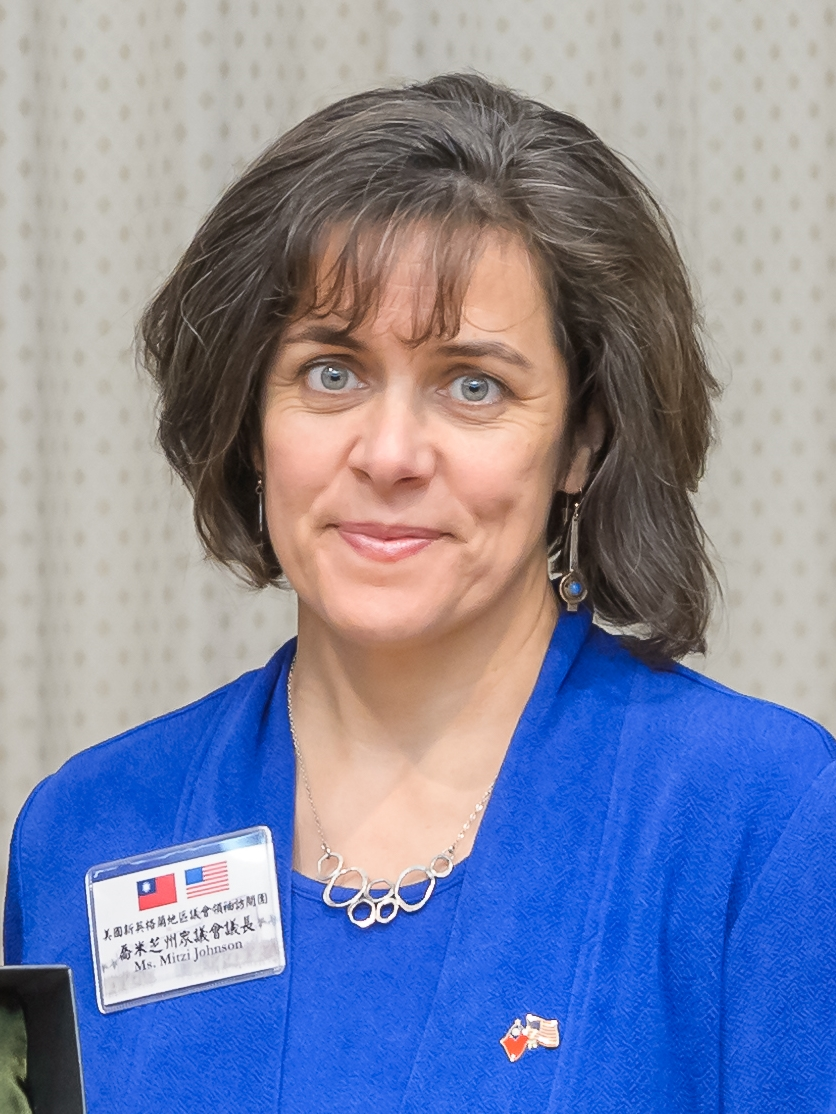
- Johnson in 2018

93rd Speaker of the Vermont House of Representatives
- In office January 4, 2017 – January 6, 2021
- Preceded by: Shap Smith
- Succeeded by: Jill Krowinski

Member of the Vermont House of Representatives from the Grand Isle-Chittenden-1 district
- In office January 9, 2003 – January 6, 2021
- Succeeded by: Michael Morgan

Personal details
- Born: November 18, 1970 (age 55) Clifton Park, New York, U.S.
- Party: Democratic
- Education: University of Vermont (BS); Harvard University (MPA)

Mitzi Johnson (born November 18, 1970) is an American Democratic politician who was the Speaker of the Vermont House of Representatives from 2017 to 2021. She represented the Grand Isle-Chittenden (GI-CHI) district (seat number 1), before losing re-election.

== Early life and education ==
Johnson was born in Clifton Park, New York, on November 18, 1970. She graduated from the University of Vermont in 1993 with a degree in environmental science and international development. In 2013, she completed a master of public administration degree from Harvard Kennedy School at Harvard University.

== Career ==
After graduating from college, Johnson became a resident of South Hero. As a public policy professional, her experience includes program and project development for Hunger Free Vermont and the Vermont Freedom to Marry Task Force. She was also a vegetable grower at South Hero's Allenholm Farm. In addition, she has worked as a substitute teacher, piano teacher and scarf designer.

Johnson was active in South Hero as a volunteer with South Hero Rescue, which provides fire fighting and emergency medical response in Grand Isle County. She was served on the board of directors of the Chittenden-Grand Isle County Visiting Nurse Association (2006-2012) and the South Hero Land Trust (1995-2008). From 2002 to 2006, she was a member of the advisory board for the University of Vermont's College of Agriculture and Life Sciences. In 2012, she was elected to the Vermont Electric Cooperative's board of directors.

== Vermont House of Representatives ==
In 2000, Johnson was an unsuccessful Democratic candidate for the Vermont House of Representatives. In 2002, she was elected to the House and has been re-elected every two years since then. From 2003 to 2007 she was a member of the House Agriculture Committee. From 2007 to 2017, she was on the Appropriations Committee; from 2015 to 2017 she was the committee's chairwoman.

In the November 3, 2020, general election, unofficial reported totals showed Johnson losing her seat in the two-member Grand Isle-Chittenden district, with the Republican incumbent Leland Morgan winning 2,768 votes, his nephew and fellow Republican Michael Morgan winning 2,619 votes, and Johnson trailing with 2,601. Johnson requested a recount, which affirmed Michael Morgan's victory by a 20 vote (2,627 - 2,601) margin.

== Speaker of the House ==
Speaker of the House Shap Smith did not run for re-election to his House seat in 2016, and ran instead for the Democratic nomination for lieutenant governor. In November 2016, Johnson was a candidate to succeed Smith as Speaker, as were Sarah Copeland-Hanzas and Charles "Chip" Conquest. Johnson and Copeland-Hanzas became the front runners and, by late November, Copeland-Hanzas concluded that Johnson's support among Democratic members of the House was enough to win a contested vote, so she withdrew. In a December 2016 meeting of the Vermont House's Democratic caucus, Copeland-Hanzas nominated Johnson for Speaker and Johnson was unanimously selected as the Democratic candidate for the position. In the full House's January 2017 election for Speaker, Johnson defeated the Republican Linda Myers of Essex.

== See also ==
- List of female speakers of legislatures in the United States

Political offices
Preceded by Shap Smith	Speaker of the Vermont House of Representatives; 2017–2021	Succeeded by Jill Krowinski
