= Jim Casey (politician) =

American politician

Member of the Vermont House of Representatives from the Addison-Rutland-1 district
- Incumbent
- Assumed office January 8, 2025
- Preceded by: Joseph Andriano
- Succeeded by: Jonathan Hescock (elect)

Personal details
- Party: Republican

James "Jim" Casey is an American politician. He serves as a Republican member for the Addison-Rutland-1 district of the Vermont House of Representatives.

Casey hails from Hubbardton, Vermont. In the 2024 Vermont House of Representatives election he was elected unopposed.
