= Joshua Dobrovich =

American politician

Member of the Vermont House of Representatives from the Orange-3 district
- Incumbent
- Assumed office January 8, 2025
- Preceded by: Rodney Graham
- Succeeded by: Fran Covey (elect)

Personal details
- Party: Republican

Joshua (Josh) Dobrovich is an American politician. He serves as a Republican member for the Orange-3 district of the Vermont House of Representatives.

Dobrovich previously worked in the automotive industry.
