= Gerald P. Krasnow =

American politician

Member of the Vermont House of Representatives from the Chittenden 5-3 district
- In office 1994–1998
- Succeeded by: Alysia Krasnow

Personal details
- Born: February 17, 1947 New York, U.S.
- Died: November 12, 1998 (aged 51)
- Party: Democratic
- Children: Alysia Krasnow; Emilie Krasnow
- Education: Hobart College

Gerald P. Krasnow (February 17, 1947 – November 12, 1998), also known as Gerry Krasnow, was an American politician. He served as a Democratic member for the Chittenden 5-3 district of the Vermont House of Representatives.

== Life and career ==
Krasnow was born in New York. He attended Hobart College.

Krasnow served in the Vermont House of Representatives from 1995 to 1998.

Krasnow died on November 12, 1998, at the age of 51.
