= Rob North =

American politician

Member of the Vermont House of Representatives from the Addison-3 district
- Incumbent
- Assumed office January 8, 2025
- Succeeded by: Ariel Bolles (elect)

Personal details
- Party: Republican
- Website: www.northforvthouse.com

Rob North is an American politician. He serves as a Republican member for the Addison-3 district of the Vermont House of Representatives.

North was born in Lafayette, Indiana, but grew up and graduated high school in New Jersey. Rob earned a Bachelor of Engineering degree from Duke University and a Master of Engineering degree from Rensselaer Polytechnic Institute. Afterwards, he worked for Honeywell for five years designing a control system for Space Station Freedom, and then moved to Vermont to work for Collins Aerospace in Vergennes (then called BF Goodrich). North currently resides in Ferrisburgh.

He competed for the same district in the 2022 election, but lost with 21.9% of the vote.
