= Kathleen James =

American politician and member of the Vermont State House of Representatives

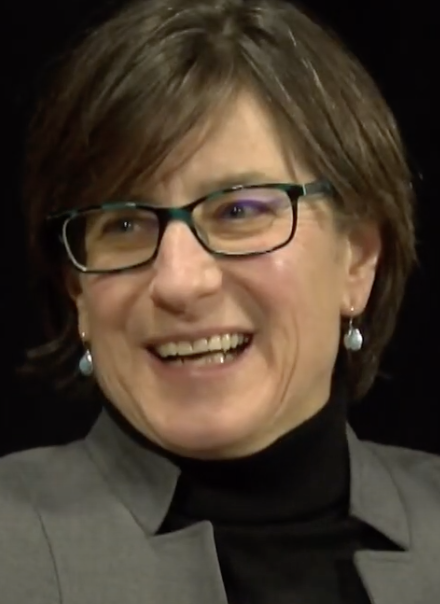
- James in 2019

Member of the Vermont House of Representatives from the Bennington-4 district
- Incumbent
- Assumed office January 9, 2019
- Preceded by: Brian Keefe
- Succeeded by: Thomas West (elect)

Personal details
- Born: Chicago, Illinois, U.S.
- Party: Democratic
- Spouse: Alexandra Heintz
- Children: 2
- Education: Northwestern University (BA) (MA)

Kathleen James is an American politician, who was elected to the Vermont House of Representatives in 2018. She represents the Bennington-4 House District as a member of the Democratic Party.

James serves as Clerk of the House Committee on Education. She also serves as a member of the Canvassing Committee.

An out lesbian, James is married to Alexandra Heintz.
