= Valorie Taylor =

American politician from Vermont

Member of the Vermont House of Representatives
- Incumbent
- Assumed office January 2, 2026
- Preceded by: Jim Harrison
- Constituency: Rutland 11 (2023–2026)

Personal details
- Party: Republican

Valorie Taylor (born 1977) is an American politician who serves in the Vermont House of Representatives.

== Early life and education ==
Taylor grew up in Clarendon, Vermont and graduated from Mill River High School in 1995. She moved to Mendon, Vermont in 2015.

== Career ==
Taylor previously served on the Mendon Selectboard. She was elected in 2021, served three years, and resigned in 2024 citing stress and wanting to spend more time with her family. Taylor was selected by Vermont Governor Phil Scott to serve as a Republican member of the Vermont House of Representatives for the Rutland-11 District in 2026. She fills the seat vacated by Jim Harrison.

== Personal life ==
Taylor, who has two children, has described herself as a "stay at home mom." She has worked as a fitness instructor and is a competitive runner and currently runs a residential painting business.
