= Jim Harrison (Vermont politician) =

American politician from Vermont

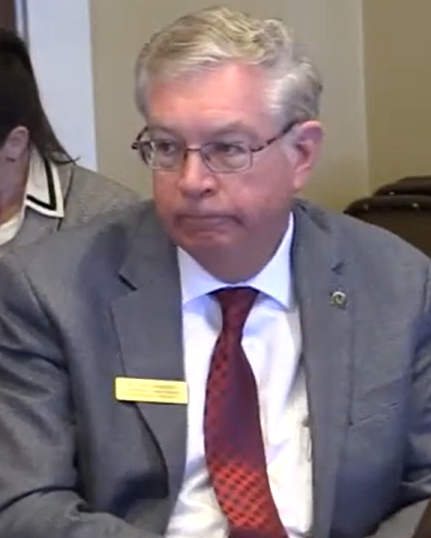
- Harrison in 2019

Member of the Vermont House of Representatives
- In office 2017 – January 6, 2026
- Succeeded by: Valorie Taylor
- Constituency: Rutland-Windsor 1 District (2017–2023); Rutland 11 (2023–2026)

Personal details
- Party: Republican

Jim Harrison is an American politician from Vermont. He served as a Republican member of the Vermont House of Representatives for the Rutland-11 District from 2017 to 2026. Harrison was the president of the Vermont Grocers Association for decades, staying in that job after it merged with the Vermont Retail Association, becoming the president of the lobbying group Vermont Retail and Grocers’ Association before his appointment to public office.

Harrison was originally appointed to his position following the resignation of Job Tate after Tate's deployment. Harrison has been elected to the post for four subsequent terms, serving as vice chair for the House Committee on Appropriations in 2022. In December 2025 he announced his resignation because he was moving to New Hampshire. His resignation was effective on January 6, the day the 2026 session began.
