= Alanna Ojibway =

American politician

Member of the Vermont House of Representatives from the Windsor-6 district
- Incumbent
- Assumed office January 2027

Personal details
- Party: Democratic

Alanna Ojibway is an American politician. A member of the Democratic Party, she is the member-elect for the Windsor-6 district of the Vermont House of Representatives.
