= Leonora Dodge =

American politician from Vermont

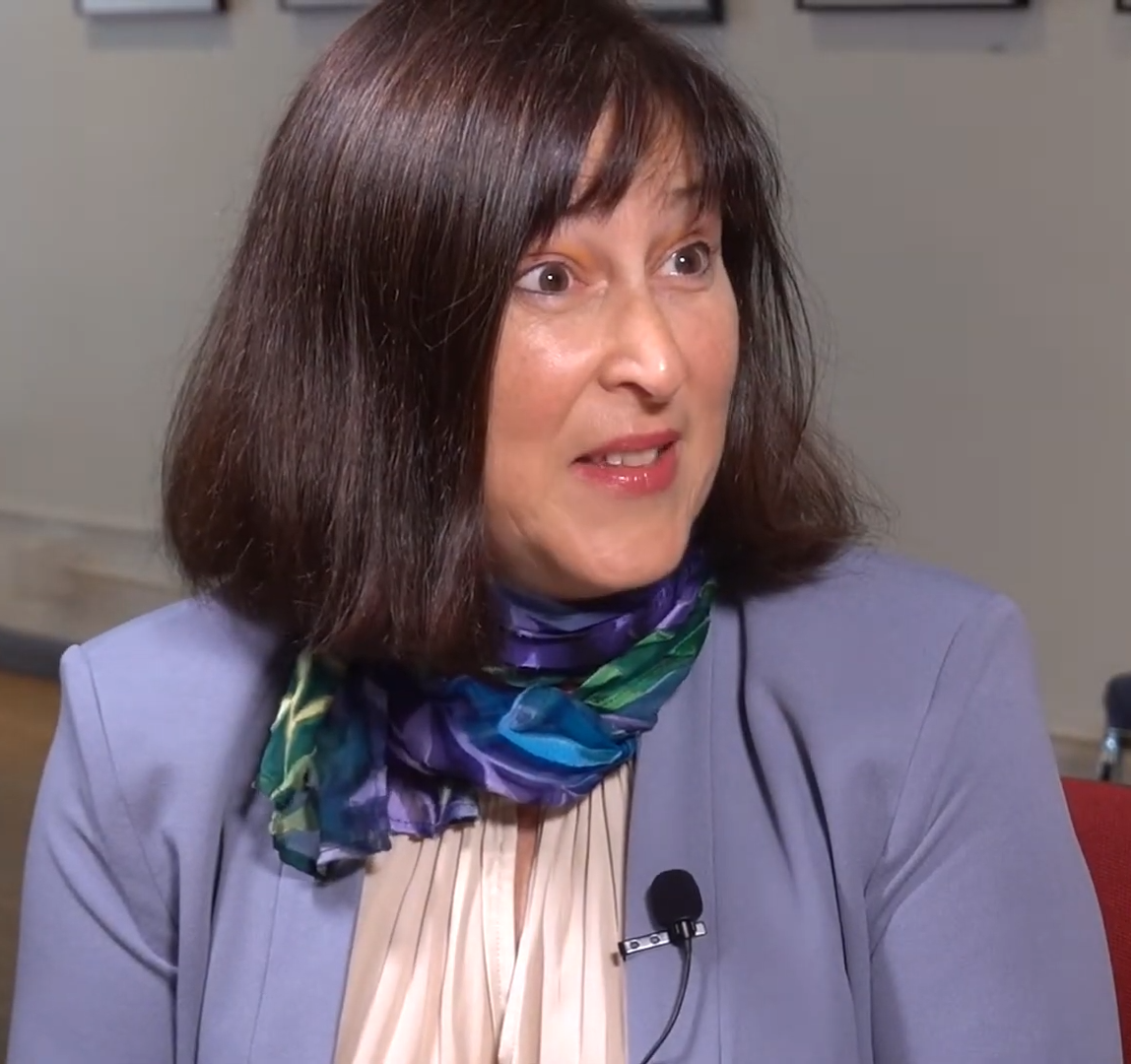
- Dodge in 2022

Member of the Vermont House of Representatives from the Chittenden-23 district
- Incumbent
- Assumed office January 4, 2023 Serving with Rey Garofano

Personal details
- Born: United States
- Party: Democratic
- Education: Williams College
- Alma mater: University of Texas at Austin

Leonora Dodge is an American politician from Vermont. She has been a Democratic member of the Vermont House of Representatives for the Chittenden-23 District since 2023.

Dodge was born in the United States to immigrant parents from Mexico and Ireland, spending her childhood in Montreal and Mexico City. Dodge has worked as a Spanish teacher in schools in Essex.
