= Sandy Pinsonault =

American politician from Vermont

Member of the Vermont House of Representatives from the Bennington Rutland district
- Incumbent
- Assumed office January 8, 2025
- Preceded by: Mike Rice

Personal details
- Born: Rutland County, Vermont
- Party: Republican
- Website: www.sandy4vt.com

Sandra "Sandy" Pinsonault (née Towslee) is an American politician from Vermont. She has been a Republican member of the Vermont House of Representatives for the Bennington Rutland District since 2025. She was the town clerk in Dorset, Vermont, and is at present a member of the Board of Trustees for Vermont Veterans Home.
