= Mike Rice (politician) =

American politician from Vermont

Member of the Vermont House of Representatives from the Bennington-Rutland district
- In office January 4, 2023 – January 8, 2025
- Preceded by: Linda Sullivan
- Succeeded by: Sandy Pinsonault

Personal details
- Born: Upstate New York, U.S.
- Party: Democratic
- Mike Rice's voice Mike Rice introducing himself in a meeting of the House Agricultural committee Recorded February 21, 2024

Mike Rice is an American politician from Vermont. He was a Democratic member of the Vermont House of Representatives for the Bennington-Rutland District from 2023 to 2025. His district covers the towns of Danby, Dorset, Landgrove, Mt. Tabor, and Peru.
