= Thomas F. Charlton =

American politician

Member of the Vermont House of Representatives from the Windsor-Windham district
- Incumbent
- Assumed office January 8, 2025
- Preceded by: Heather Chase

Personal details
- Party: Republican

Thomas F. Charlton is an American politician. He is the representative for the Windsor-Windham district in the Vermont House of Representatives.

Charlton is an ordained Baptist minister.
