= Casey Toof =

American politician

Member of the Vermont House of Representatives
- In office January 9, 2019 – January 16, 2026
- Preceded by: Corey Parent
- Succeeded by: Jack Brigham
- Constituency: Franklin-3-1 (2019–2023); Franklin-8 (2023–2026)

Personal details
- Born: St. Albans, Vermont, U. S.
- Party: Republican
- Spouse: Ashley Lockerby (m. 2014)
- Children: 3
- Education: Castleton University

Casey Toof is an American politician. He served as a Republican member of the Vermont House of Representatives.

== Life and career ==
Toof was born in St. Albans, Vermont. He attended St. Albans City Elementary School, Bellows Free Academy, and Castleton University, where he earned a degree in history and education.

In 2019, Toof was elected to represent the Franklin-3-1 district of the Vermont House of Representatives, succeeding Corey Parent. In 2022 he was elected to represent the Franklin-8 district.

Toof submitted his resignation on January 8, 2026. He stated that since he accepted a new position as town manager of St. Albans, he could not manage the strain of an additional commute to Montpelier.
