= Leland Morgan =

American politician

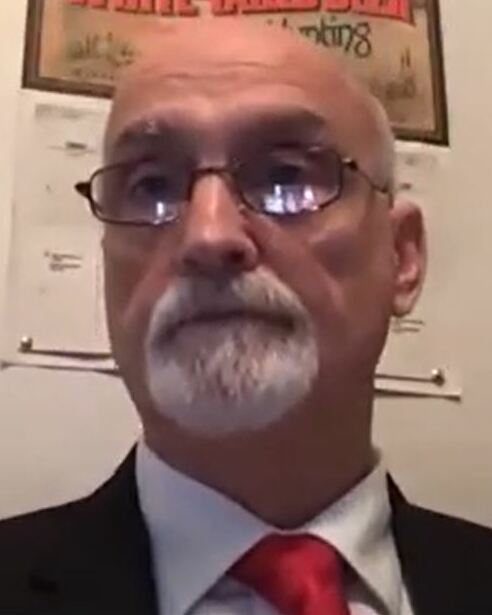

Member of the Vermont House of Representatives from the Grand Isle-Chittenden district
- Incumbent
- Assumed office January 8, 2025
- In office 2021–2023

Personal details
- Party: Republican
- Relations: Michael Morgan (nephew)

Leland Morgan is an American politician from Vermont. He is a Republican member of the Vermont House of Representatives.

== Career ==
In the November 3, 2020 general election, unofficial reported totals showed Mitzi Johnson losing her seat in the two-member Grand Isle-Chittenden district, with Republican incumbent Leland Morgan winning 2,768 votes, his nephew and fellow Republican Michael Morgan winning 2,619 votes, and Johnson trailing with 2,601. Johnson requested a recount, which affirmed Michael Morgan's victory by a 20 vote (2,627 - 2,601) margin.
