= Matt Birong =

American representative and professional chef

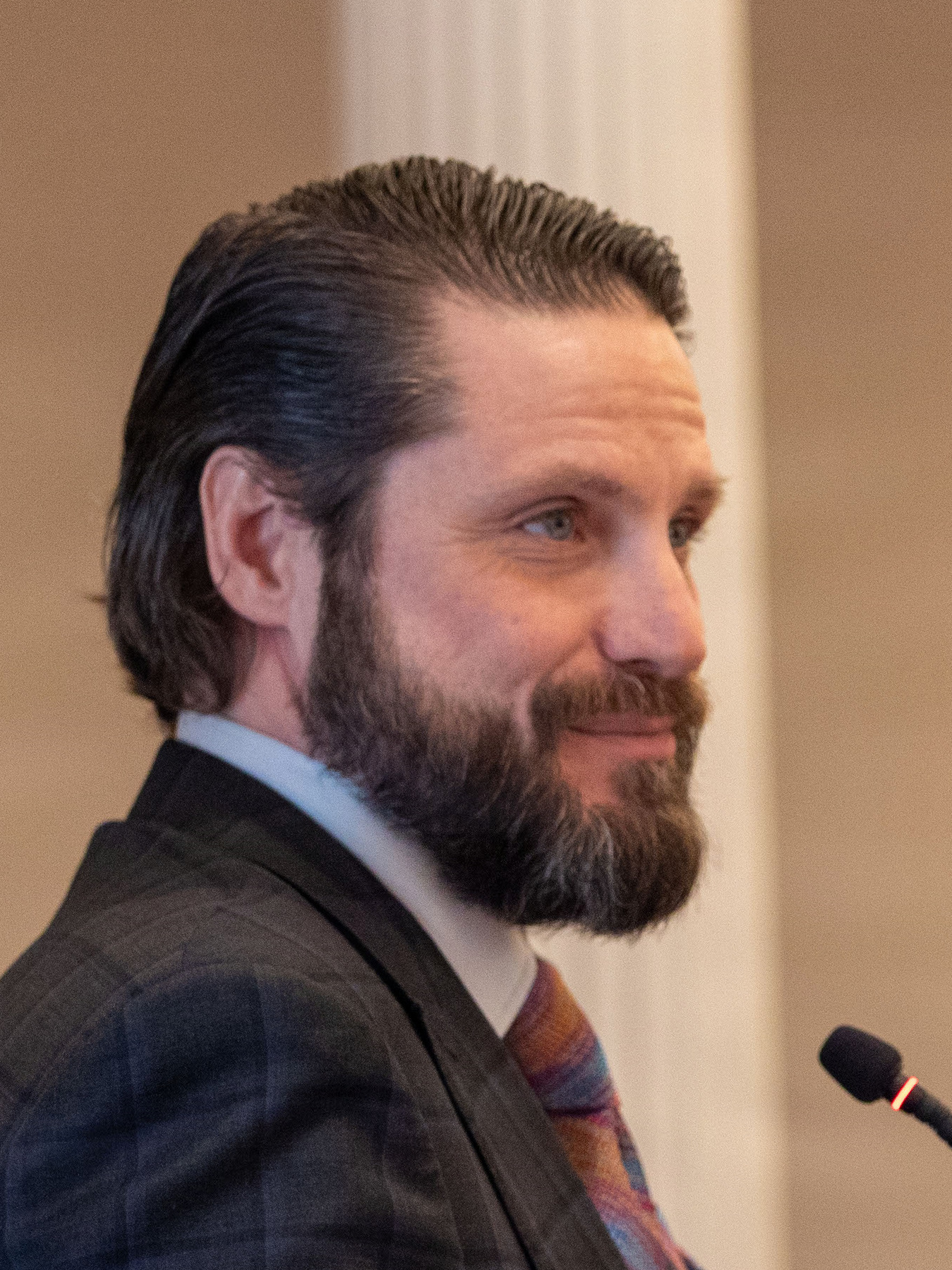
- Birong in 2026

Member of the Vermont House of Representatives from the Addison-3 district
- Incumbent
- Assumed office January 9, 2019
- Preceded by: Warren Van Wyck
- Succeeded by: John Stroup (elect)

Personal details
- Born: May 23, 1977 (age 49) Burlington, Vermont, U.S.
- Party: Democratic

Matthew Joseph Birong Jr. (born May 23, 1977) is an American chef and politician who has represented the Addison-3 Vermont Representative District alongside Diane Lanpher in the Vermont House of Representatives since 2019 as a member of the Democratic Party.

== Early life ==
Birong was born on May 23, 1977, in Burlington, Vermont, to Matthew Joseph Birong Sr. and Catherine Mary McNamara, both natives of New York City. He was raised in Essex, Vermont. Birong attended the New England Culinary Institute and graduated with a degree in culinary arts, becoming a professional chef and working for over 20 years in establishments in Manhattan, Boston, and Burlington.

== Personal life ==
Birong lives with his wife, Danelle Lello Birong, and their dog, Luna, in Vergennes, Vermont.
