= Robert Spain (politician) =

American businessman and politician

Robert Spain (born June 26, 1956) is a former Republican member of the Vermont House of Representatives and former town manager of Millbury, Massachusetts.

== Biography ==
Robert James Spain Jr. was born in Worcester, Massachusetts on June 26, 1956, a son of Robert J. Spain and Patricia A. (Quirk) Spain. He attended the schools of Worcester, and graduated from Burncoat Senior High School. Spain received a Bachelor of Arts degree in management and public administration from Worcester State University in 1978 and a Master of Arts degree in business management from Webster University in 1985. He is a veteran of the United States Air Force, and served in the Intelligence field, including postings to Turkey and Germany. He later served in the Vermont Army National Guard.

Spain moved to Bradford, Vermont in 1988, where he owned and operated the Bradford Village Store. He also became a member of the village board of trustees and served on the board of directors of the Bradford Senior Independence Housing Corporation. Spain also served as chairman of Bradford Business Associates and president of the Bradford Republican Committee. In addition, he was active in veterans organizations including Bradford's American Legion Post 20.

In 1992, Spain won election to the Vermont House of Representatives, defeating incumbent Democrat Wayne G. Kenyon. He was reelected in 1994, and served from 1993 to 1997. Spain was defeated by Kenyon in 1996.

After leaving the Vermont legislature, Spain served as town administrator of Millbury, Massachusetts and Uxbridge, Massachusetts, then worked as director of government relations for Charter Communications. Spain was appointed town manager of Millbury in 2008. He served until retiring in 2016.

Spain was married to the former Mary Clancy. They have four daughters. He later married Amy Williams.
