= Jack Brigham =

American politician

Member of the Vermont House of Representatives
- Incumbent
- Assumed office February 20, 2026
- Preceded by: Casey Toof
- Constituency: Franklin-8

Personal details
- Party: Republican

John "Jack" Brigham is an American politician and a member of the Vermont House of Representatives.

== Biography ==
Brigham is also a member of the St. Albans Selectboard, the governing body of the town of St. Albans, Vermont.

On February 20, 2026, Brigham was appointed by Governor Phil Scott to the Vermont House of Representatives, to fill the vacancy created by the resignation of Casey Toof.

Brigham and his wife, Heather, operate Holyoke Farm, a dairy farm in St. Albans, Vermont. The farm also produces maple syrup, beef, and hay.
