= Ken Wells (Vermont politician) =

American politician

Member of the Vermont House of Representatives from the Orleans-3 district
- Incumbent
- Assumed office January 8, 2025
- Preceded by: Dave Templeman

Personal details
- Born: Newport, Vermont
- Party: Republican
- Education: Lyndon State College
- Website: www.votekenwellsoc3.com

Kenneth "Ken" Wells is an American politician. He serves as a Republican member for the Orleans-3 district of the Vermont House of Representatives.
