= Michael Morgan (American politician) =

American politician

Member of the Vermont House of Representatives from the Grand Isle-Chittenden district
- Incumbent
- Assumed office January 6, 2021
- Preceded by: Mitzi Johnson

Personal details
- Party: Republican
- Relations: Leland Morgan (uncle)

Michael Morgan is an American politician from Vermont. He defeated Democratic Speaker Mitzi Johnson in the 2020 Vermont House of Representatives election.

== Career ==
In the November 3, 2020 general election, unofficial reported totals showed Mitzi Johnson losing her seat in the two-member Grand Isle-Chittenden district, with Republican incumbent Leland Morgan winning 2,768 votes, his nephew and fellow Republican Michael Morgan winning 2,619 votes, and Johnson trailing with 2,601. Johnson requested a recount, which affirmed Michael Morgan's victory by a 20 vote (2,627 - 2,601) margin.
