= Thomas West (Vermont politician) =

American politician

Member-elect of the Vermont House of Representatives from the Bennington-4 district
- Assuming office January 2027
- Succeeding: Kathleen James

Personal details
- Party: Democratic
- Website: www.westforvermont.com

Thomas West is an American politician. A member of the Democratic Party, he is the member-elect for the Bennington-4 district of the Vermont House of Representatives.
