= Peter Conlon =

American politician and member of the Vermont State House of Representatives

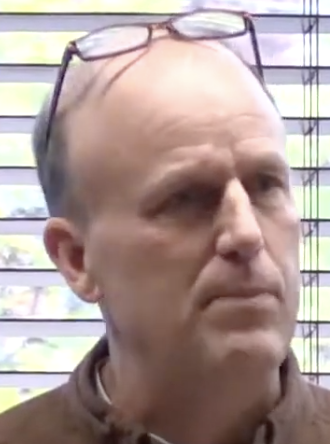
- Conlon in 2018

Member of the Vermont House of Representatives from the Addison-2 district
- Incumbent
- Assumed office 2017
- Succeeded by: Tanya Byker (elect)

Personal details
- Born: Montpelier, Vermont, U.S.
- Party: Democratic
- Children: 3
- Education: Dartmouth College (BA)

Peter Conlon is an American politician who has served in the Vermont House of Representatives since 2017.
