= Joe Luneau =

American politician

Member of the Vermont House of Representatives from the Franklin-3 district
- Incumbent
- Assumed office January 8, 2025
- Preceded by: Mike McCarthy

Personal details
- Party: Republican
- Website: www.joeluneau.com

Joseph "Joe" Luneau is an American politician. He serves as a Republican member for the Franklin-3 district of the Vermont House of Representatives.

Born and raised in St. Albans, Luneau earned a bachelors in history from Boston College. He currently serves as the head of the St. Albans Museum.

Luneau competed in the same district in the 2022 election, but lost with 42.4% of the vote.
