= Julia Andrews =

American politician from Vermont

Member of the Vermont House of Representatives from the Chittenden-25 district
- In office January 4, 2023 – January 8, 2025
- Preceded by: Constituency established
- Succeeded by: Brenda Steady

Personal details
- Born: Massachusetts
- Party: Democratic
- Education: University of Massachusetts

Julia Andrews is an American politician from Vermont. She was a Democratic member of the Vermont House of Representatives for the Chittenden-25 since 2023 to 2025.
