= Jonathan Hescock =

American politician

Member-elect of the Vermont House of Representatives from the Addison-Rutland district
- Assuming office January 2027
- Succeeding: Jim Casey

Personal details
- Party: Democratic

Jonathan Hescock is an American politician. A member of the Democratic Party, he is the member-elect for the Addison-Rutland district of the Vermont House of Representatives.
