= Karen Lueders =

American politician from Vermont

Member of the Vermont House of Representatives from the Addison 4 district
- Incumbent
- Assumed office October 22, 2025
- Preceded by: Mari Cordes

Personal details
- Party: Democratic

Karen Lueders is an American politician from Vermont. She has been a Democratic member of the Vermont House of Representatives for the Addison 4 District since 2025. She was appointed to replace Mari Cordes by Governor Phil Scott. She is a lawyer from Lincoln, Vermont.

== Personal life ==
Her son Tim Lueders-Dumont, is executive director of the Vermont Department of State's Attorneys and Sheriffs.
