= Brenda Steady =

American politician from Vermont

Member of the Vermont House of Representatives from the Chittenden 25 district
- Incumbent
- Assumed office January 8, 2025
- Preceded by: Julia Andrews

Personal details
- Born: Milton, Vermont
- Party: Republican
- Website: www.steadyforvthouse.org

Brenda Steady is an American politician from Vermont. She has been a Republican member of the Vermont House of Representatives for the Chittenden 25 District since 2025. She was previously a member of the Milton select board.
