= Mike Roy (politician) =

American politician

Member-elect of the Vermont House of Representatives from the Addison-1 district
- Assuming office January 2027
- Succeeding: Amy Sheldon

Personal details
- Party: Democratic

Mike Roy is an American politician. A member of the Democratic Party, he is the member-elect for the Addison-1 district of the Vermont House of Representatives.
