= Rey Garofano =

American politician from Vermont

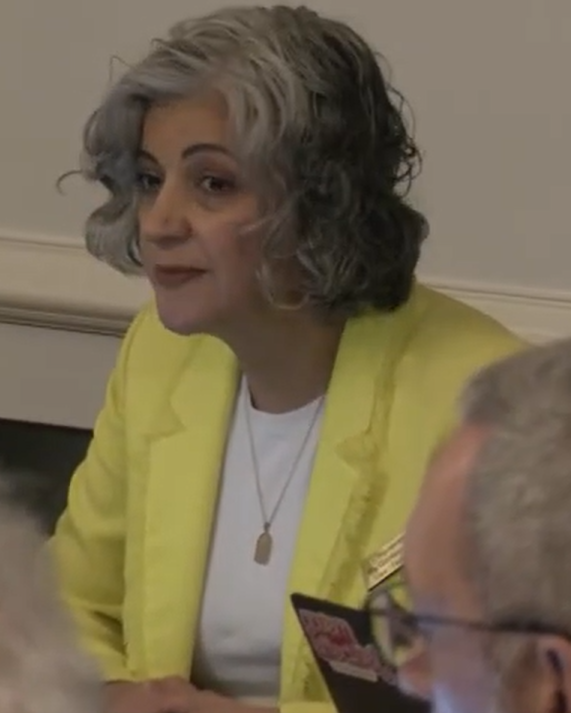
- Garofano in 2026

Member of the Vermont House of Representatives
- Incumbent
- Assumed office January 18, 2022 Serving with Tanya Vyhovsky (2022–2023); Leonora Dodge (2023–Present)
- Preceded by: Marybeth Redmond
- Constituency: Chittenden-8-1 (2022–2023); Chittenden-23 (2023–Present)

Personal details
- Born: Iran
- Party: Democratic
- Children: 1
- Education: Champlain College (BS)

Golrang "Rey" Garofano is an American politician serving as a member of the Vermont House of Representatives from the Chittenden-8-1 district. She was appointed to the House in January 2022.

== Early life and education ==
Garofano was born in Iran and moved to Los Angeles in the 1980s amid the Iran–Iraq War. She earned a Bachelor of Science degree in business management from Champlain College in 2014.

== Career ==
Prior to entering politics, Garofano owned a Persian restaurant and worked as an associate at the Creative Discourse Group, a consulting firm. Since 2007, she has worked for the Vermont Department for Children and Families. Garofano was appointed to the Vermont House of Representatives in January 2022 by Governor Phil Scott, succeeding Marybeth Redmond.
