= Amy Sheldon =

American Democratic politician

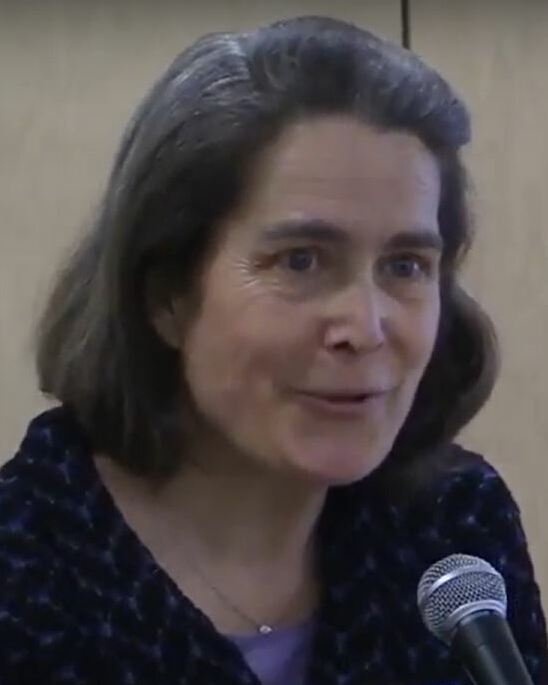
- Sheldon in 2018

Member of the Vermont House of Representatives from the Addison 1 district
- Incumbent
- Assumed office January 7, 2015
- Preceded by: Paul Ralston
- Succeeded by: Mike Roy (elect)

Personal details
- Born: July 20, 1966 (age 60) Memphis, Tennessee, U.S.
- Party: Democratic
- Spouse: Ashar Nelson
- Education: Middlebury College; University of Vermont

Amy Sheldon (born July 20, 1966) is an American Democratic politician. Since January 2015 she serves as member of the Vermont House of Representatives from Addison 1 district.
