= Kirk White =

American politician

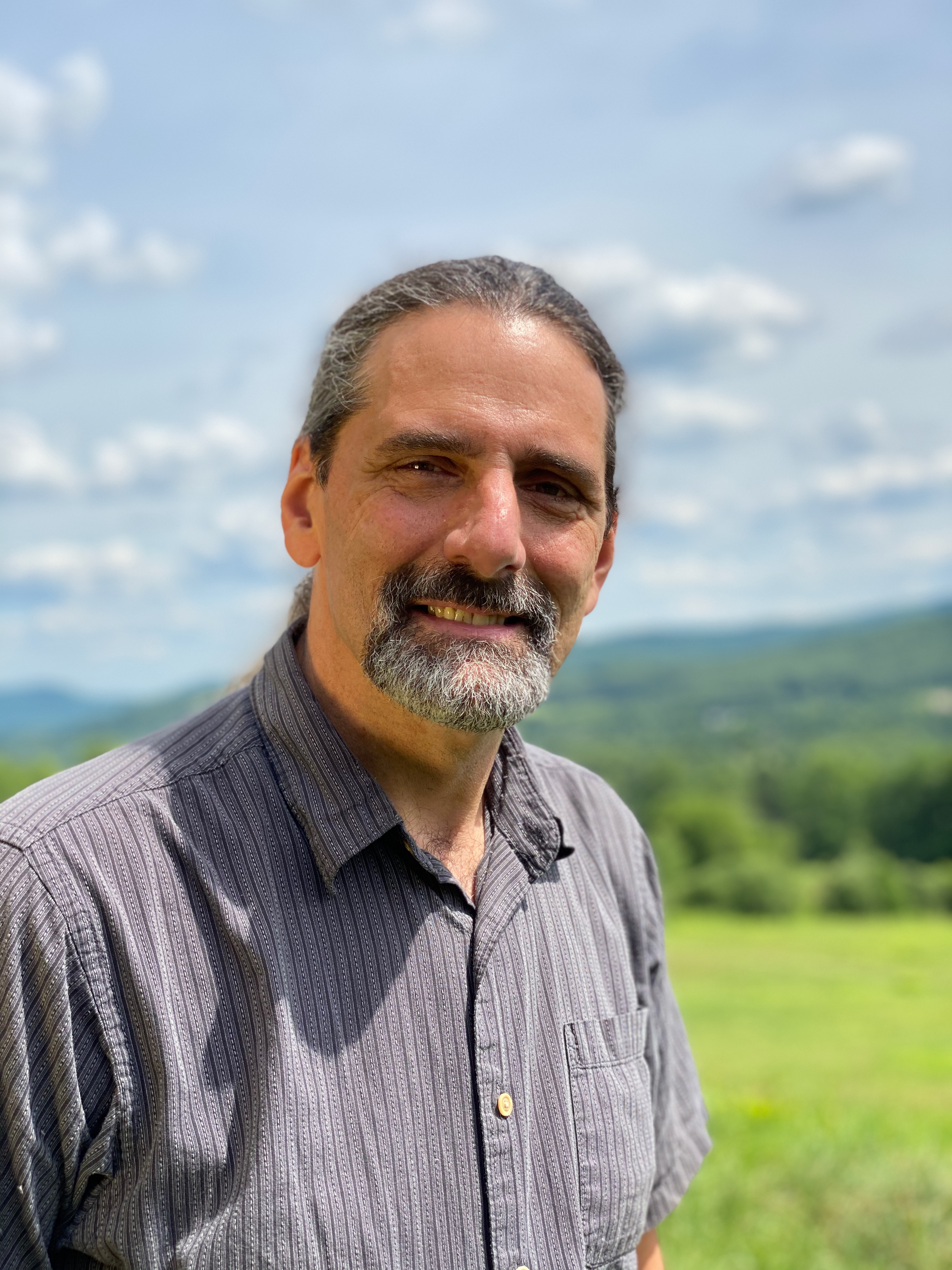
- Kirk White
- Born: May 21, 1962 (age 64); Bethel, Vermont, U.S.
- Education: Master's Degree in Counseling
- Alma mater: University Of Vermont And State Agricultural College, Johnson State College
- Occupation: Author
- Known for: Pagan author and leader
- Title: Reverend
- Board member of: Covenant of the Goddess 2001-present (co-President 2007-2008), Church of the Sacred Earth: A Union of Pagan Congregations (1987-present), Cherry Hill Seminary 1997-2007 (Academic Dean 1997-2007)
- Spouse(s): Amy Danley-White, 1992-present
- Children: Killian White

Kirk White (born May 21, 1962) is an American neopagan author and politician. Prior to serving the Windsor-Addison district in the Vermont House of Representatives, he was founder and president of Cherry Hill Seminary. White's multidisciplinary education includes a Master of Arts in mental health and addictions counseling, as well as training in acupuncture.

== Contributions to neopaganism ==
White was listed among the 25 Most Influential Pagans in 2004. Margot Adler interviewed White for Drawing Down the Moon, and he has contributed material to other neopagan works.

He serves as executive director of Church of the Sacred Earth, and founded the Wiccan Church of Vermont, the first legally-recognized Wiccan congregation in the state. White was subsequently ordained a minister of the Vermont church.

He has served as both national public information officer and co-president of the Covenant of the Goddess.

White is affiliated with Freemasonry and the Hermetic Order of the Golden Dawn.

== Author ==
White has published four books:

- Adept Circle Magick, ISBN 0-8065-2699-8
- Advanced Circle Magick, ISBN 0-8065-2698-X
- Operative Freemasonry, ISBN 0-6156-1715-8
- Masterful Magick, ISBN 1-5403-6174-8

== Presenter ==
White is a frequent lecturer at Neopagan gatherings and festivals, speaking on such topics as organization, pastoral counseling, initiation, and magical practice. White has been on the program for numerous events:

- Between the Worlds
- Delmarva Pagan Pride Festival
- Florida Pagan Gathering
- Harvest Home Gathering
- Pantheacon
- Pagan Spirit Gathering
- Rites of Spring
- Council of Magickal Arts
- Laurelin Community's Annual Lughnasah Festival (which was founded by and organized yearly by White)
- New York City Pagan Pride Day 2013
