= Christopher Howland (politician) =

American politician from Vermont

Member of the Vermont House of Representatives from the Rutland 4 district
- Incumbent
- Assumed office January 8, 2025
- Preceded by: Paul Clifford

Personal details
- Party: Republican

Christopher Howland is an American politician from Vermont. He has been a Republican member of the Vermont House of Representatives for the Rutland 4 District since 2025.
