= Alyaksandr Krasnow =

Belarusian footballer

Personal information
- Date of birth: 14 February 1998 (age 28)
- Place of birth: Zhodino, Minsk Oblast, Belarus
- Height: 1.92 m (6 ft 4 in)
- Position: Forward

Team information
- Current team: Lokomotiv Gomel
- Number: 17

Youth career
- 2014–2017: Torpedo-BelAZ Zhodino

Senior career*
Years	Team	Apps	(Gls)
2016–2019	Torpedo-BelAZ Zhodino	2	(0)
2018	→ Smolevichi (loan)	12	(0)
2019	→ Smolevichi (loan)	9	(1)
2020	Smorgon	6	(0)
2020	Molodechno	12	(3)
2021	Krumkachy Minsk	26	(5)
2022	Maxline Rogachev	16	(10)
2023	Zhodino-Yuzhnoye	28	(11)
2024–	Lokomotiv Gomel	17	(2)

International career
2016–2017	Belarus U19	6	(0)
- * Club domestic league appearances and goals as of 10 December 2024

Alyaksandr Krasnow (Belarusian: Аляксандр Красноў; Russian: Александр Краснов; born 14 February 1998) is a Belarusian professional footballer who plays for Lokomotiv Gomel.
