= Tanya Byker =

American politician

Member-elect of the Vermont House of Representatives from the Addison-2 district
- Assuming office January 2027
- Succeeding: Peter Conlon

Personal details
- Party: Democratic

Tanya Byker is an American politician. A member of the Democratic Party, she is the member-elect for the Addison-2 district of the Vermont House of Representatives.
