= Emilie Krasnow =

American politician from Vermont

Member of the Vermont House of Representatives from the Chittenden-9 district
- Incumbent
- Assumed office January 4, 2023
- Preceded by: Constituency established

Personal details
- Born: Middlebury, Vermont
- Party: Democratic
- Education: Mendoza College of Business at the University of Notre Dame

Emilie Krasnow is an American politician from Vermont. She has been a Democratic member of the Vermont House of Representatives for the Chittenden-9 District since 2023.

== Personal life ==
Krasnow's father Gerry Krasnow is a former state representative.
