= Lamoille Union High School =

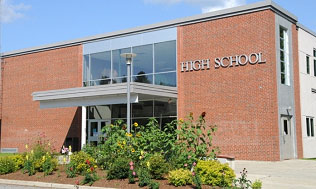

Location
- 736 Vermont Route 15; Hyde Park, Lamoille County, Vermont 05655; United States; 44.6014403°N 72.6303949°W

Information
- Type: Public secondary
- School district: Lamoille North Supervisory Union
- Principal: Bethann Pirie
- Grades: Ninth–Twelfth grade
- Enrollment: 495 (2023-2024)
- Colours: Blue and Gold
- Team name: Lancers
- Communities served: Belvidere, Cambridge, Eden, Hyde Park, Johnson, and Waterville, Vermont
- Website: luhsvt.org

Lamoille Union High School (LUHS) is a public secondary school located in Hyde Park, Vermont on RT. 15 West. The school shares its campus with Lamoille Union Middle School and the Green Mountain Technology & Career Center.

== Demographics ==
In the 2016-2017 school year, 479 students were enrolled at Lamoille Union and the student-to-teacher ratio was 11.83.

In 2005, 70% of seniors reported plans for full-time employment or attending a vocational school or college after graduation. 56% of graduates were enrolled in higher education programs six months after graduation. In 2014, LUHS partnered with the Vermont Student Assistance Corporation to increase student aspiration rates to higher education opportunities.

== History ==
Lamoille Union High School opened in September 1967, with Carl Fortune Jr. serving as its first principal. The building was constructed as part of a consolidation of three smaller middle and high schools: Lamoille Central Academy, Johnson, and Cambridge.

The school opened two weeks late in 1967 because of construction delays. The space used by the Lamoille Area Vocational Center (now Green Mountain Technology and Career Center) was not completed until late fall, and teachers and students from the vocational center were assigned to temporary classrooms in the high school, including storage closets.

== Academics ==
In 2016, Lamoille Union adopted proficiency-based graduation requirements in line with the Vermont Educational Quality Standards. In order to graduate, students graduating in the year 2020 and beyond must demonstrate that they have achieved proficiency in the content-area graduation standards of the Educational Quality Standards.

LUHS students prior to the class of 2020 were required to take four years of English, three years of Social Studies, Mathematics, and Science, two years worth of Physical Education and Health, and one year worth of Visual or Performing Arts, as well as eight years worth of elective courses.

In addition to core academic subjects, Lamoille Union offers courses in Business, Design, Music and Dance, Art, and World Languages, as well as Advanced Placement courses in English, Math, Science, Social Studies, World Languages (French, Spanish, and Latin) and Art.

The Library and Media Center serves both the middle and high school, and houses a collection of over 16,000 books.

== Student activities and athletics ==
Lamoille Union hosts a range of student- and faculty-organized extracurricular activities, including chorus and band, dance, debate, 4-square, Scholars' Bowl, and Student Council.

Lamoille Union's sports teams include Varsity Boys' and Girls' basketball, Varsity Dance Team, alpine skiing, lacrosse, baseball, softball, and soccer, and Junior Varsity baseball and basketball. Lamoille Union is a Division II school. Their sports teams are named the Lancers.
