= Larry Satcowitz =

Vermont Democratic politician

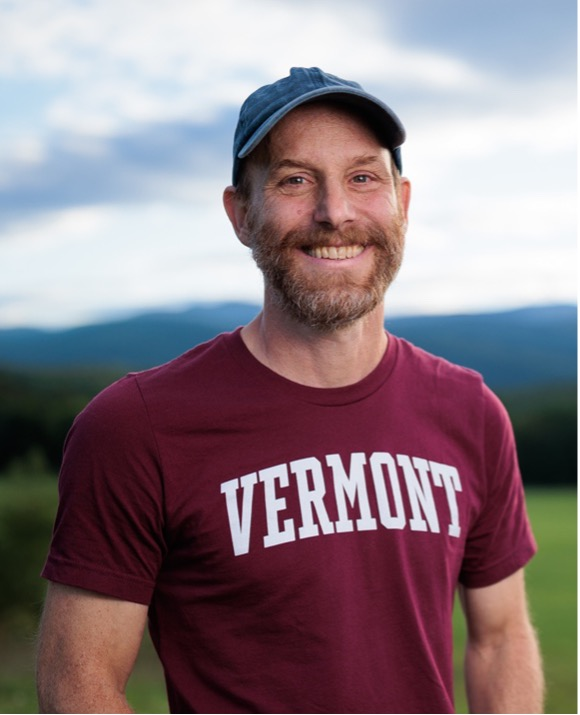
- Satcowitz in 2022

Member of the Vermont House of Representatives from the Orange-Washington-Addison district
- Incumbent
- Assumed office January 6, 2021 Serving with Jay Hooper (politician)
- Preceded by: Peter Reed

Personal details
- Party: Democratic

Larry Satcowitz is a Vermont educator and politician elected to the Vermont's House of Representatives representing the Orange-Washington-Addison district.

Satcowitz ran for the position in the 2018 election but lost to Independent Ben Jickling. Jickling left the position partway through his term and was replaced by Independent Peter Reed by Governor Phil Scott. Satcowitz defeated Reed in 2020, and served alongside incumbent representative Jay Hooper. He is Ranking Member of Vermont's House Environment Committee and also serves on the Vermont General Assembly's Joint Committee on Legislative Rules.

Satcowitz's platform focused on education, the economy and health care as well as the need to do something about the urgent issues of climate change and systemic racism. He was endorsed in 2018 and 2020 by Bernie Sanders.

Satcowitz is a five-term member of the Randolph Selectboard. He was elected for a fourth term in November 2026.
