= Debra Powers =

American politician from Vermont

Member of the Vermont House of Representatives from the Caledonia 1 district
- Incumbent
- Assumed office January 8, 2025
- Preceded by: Bobby Farlice-Rubio

Personal details
- Party: Republican
- Education: Mill River Union High School
- Alma mater: Vermont Technical College
- Website: www.votedebbievt.com

Debra (Debbie) Lynn Powers is an American politician from Vermont. She has been a Republican member of the Vermont House of Representatives for the Caledonia 1 District since 2025.

== Early life ==
Powers grew up on a dairy farm in Ira, Vermont, in Rutland County. She graduated from Mill River Union High School and attended Vermont Technical College and earned a business degree in Agriculture.
