= Deborah Cordz Dolgin =

American politician from Vermont

Member of the Vermont House of Representatives from the Caledonia-Essex district
- Incumbent
- Assumed office January 8, 2025

Personal details
- Born: New Jersey
- Party: Republican
- Education: State University of New York at Plattsburgh; University of Vermont
- Website: debdolgin4vthouse.com

Deborah (Debbie) Cordz Dolgin is an American politician from Vermont. She has been a Republican member of the Vermont House of Representatives for the Caledonia-Essex District since 2025.
