= Jay Hooper (politician) =

Vermont politician

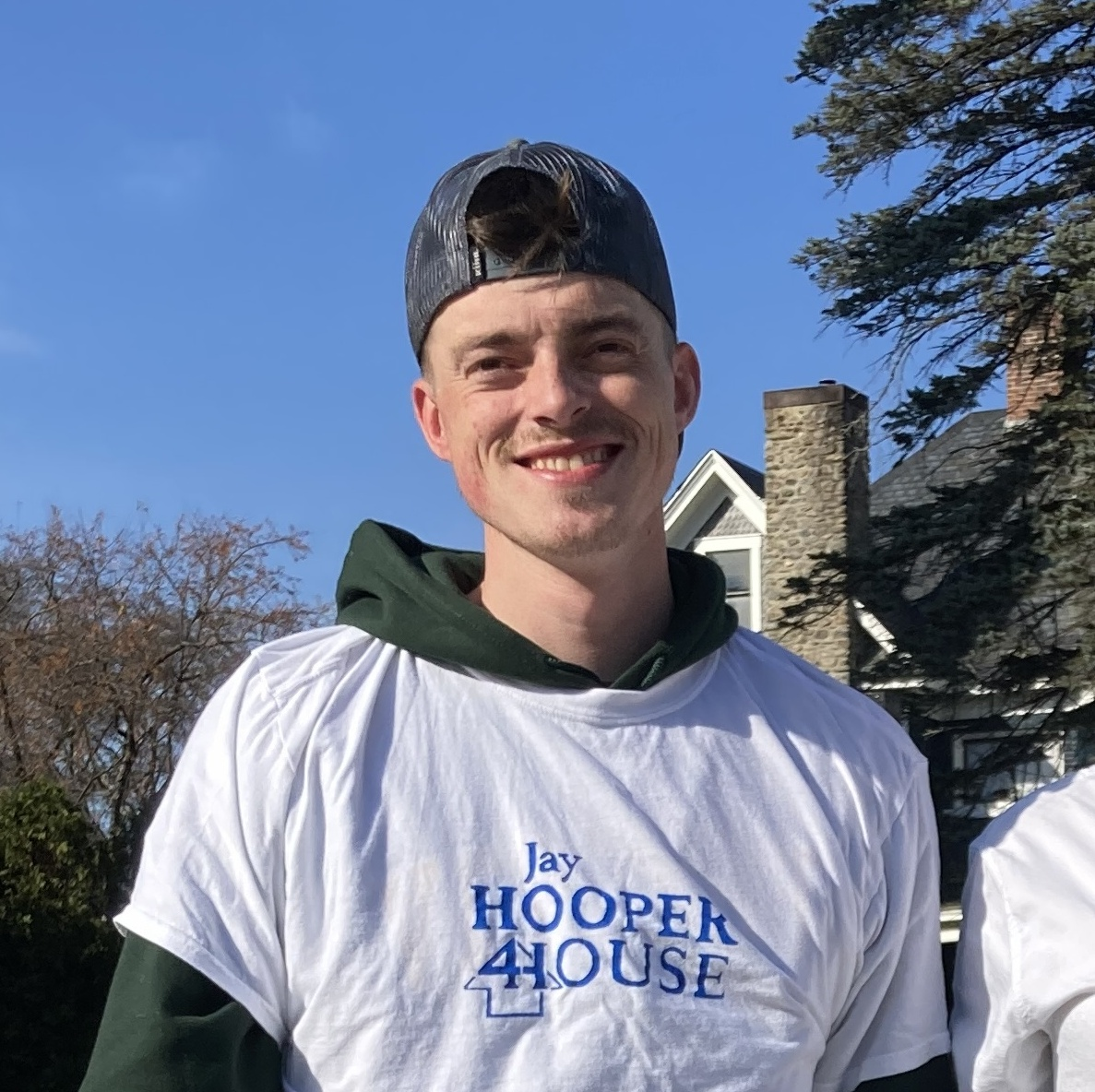
- Hooper in 2024

Member of the Vermont House of Representatives from the Orange-Washington-Addison district
- Incumbent
- Assumed office January 2017 Serving with Larry Satcowitz
- Preceded by: Patsy French

Personal details
- Party: Democratic
- Education: Connecticut College (BA)

Philip Jay Hooper (born 1993) is a politician elected to the Vermont's House of Representatives representing the Orange-Washington-Addison district. Hooper was elected in 2016 and re-elected in 2018, 2020, 2022 and 2024. When originally elected, he was one of the youngest legislators in Vermont. He is the son of former State Representative and Secretary of State Donald M. Hooper. While the legislature is in session, he hosts a radio show called The Heat of the House on WCVR.

Hooper attended high school at Trinity-Pawling. He graduated from Connecticut College with a double-major in history and government.
