= Chris Brown (Vermont politician) =

American politician

Member-elect of the Vermont House of Representatives from the Rutland-3 district
- Assuming office January 2027
- Succeeding: Zachary Harvey

Personal details
- Party: Republican

Chris Brown is an American politician. He was elected as a Republican member for the Rutland-3 district of the Vermont House of Representatives in November 2024. However, he resigned before the start of the legislative session due to his wife's cancer diagnosis. Zachary Harvey was appointed to the seat in his stead.
