= Zachary Harvey =

American politician from Vermont

Member of the Vermont House of Representatives from the Rutland 3 district
- Incumbent
- Assumed office January 8, 2025
- Preceded by: Chris Brown

Personal details
- Party: Republican

Zachary Harvey is an American politician from Vermont. He been a member of the Vermont House of Representatives for the Rutland 3 District since 2025. He was appointed to replace Chris Brown by Governor Phil Scott. Harvey is a graduate of Providence College.
