= Scott Campbell (politician) =

American politician and member of the Vermont State House of Representatives

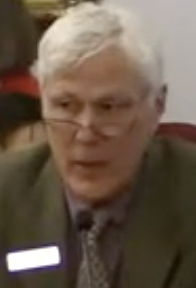
- Campbell in 2019

Member of the Vermont House of Representatives from the Caledonia 3 district
- Incumbent
- Assumed office January 9, 2019
- Preceded by: Janssen Willhoit

Personal details
- Born: Maryland, U.S.
- Party: Democratic
- Children: 3
- Education: Cornell University (BA)

Scott Campbell is an American politician who has served in the Vermont House of Representatives since 2019.
