= 2020 Vermont House of Representatives election =

- November 3, 2020

All 150 seats in the Vermont House of Representatives 76 seats needed for a majority
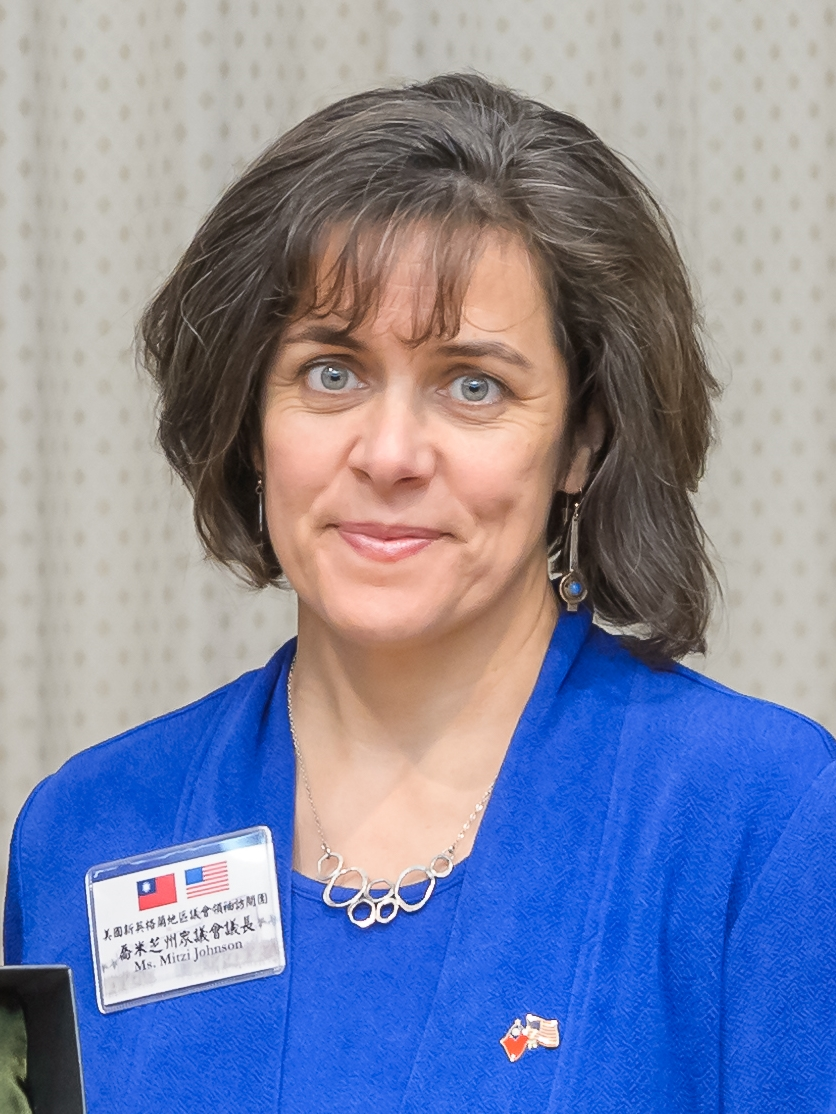

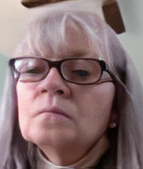
	Majority party	Minority party
Leader	Mitzi Johnson	Patricia McCoy
Party	Democratic	Republican
Leader's seat	Grand Isle-Chittenden-1 (lost re-election)	Rutland-1
Last election	95	43
Seats before	95	43
Seats won	92	46
Seat change	▼3	▲3
Popular vote	266,017 (Note: Not counting Progressive and Republican candidates who were also nominated by the Democratic Party.)	167,319 (Note: Not counting Democratic candidates who were also nominated by the Republican Party.)
Percentage	54.8%	34.5%
Swing	▼3.7%	▲4.7%
	Third party	Fourth party
Leader	Robin Chesnut-Tangerman	none
Party	Progressive	Independent
Leader's seat	Rutland-Bennington (lost re-election)	none
Last election	7	5
Seats before	7	5
Seats won	7	5
Seat change	Steady	Steady
Popular vote	20,362 (Note: Not counting Democratic candidates who were also nominated by the Progressive Party.)	24,102
Percentage	4.2%	5.0%
Swing	▼1.8%	▼0.7%
- Results: Republican hold Republican gain Democratic hold Democratic gain Progressive hold Progressive gain Independent hold Independent gain
Speaker before election
Mitzi Johnson
Democratic
Elected Speaker
Jill Krowinski
Democratic

The 2020 Vermont House of Representatives elections took place as part of the biennial United States elections. Vermont voters elected all 150 state representatives from 104 districts, with each district electing between one and two representatives. State representatives serve two-year terms in the Vermont House of Representatives. A primary election on August 11, 2020, determined which candidates appeared on the November 3 general election ballot. All the members elected will serve in the Vermont General Assembly.

== Results ==
District	Incumbent	Party	Elected representative	Party
Addison 1	Amy Sheldon	Dem	Amy Sheldon	Dem
Addison 1	Robin Scheu	Dem	Robin Scheu	Dem
Addison 2	Peter Conlon	Dem	Peter Conlon	Dem
Addison 3	Matt Birong	Dem	Matt Birong	Dem
Addison 3	Diane Lanpher	Dem	Diane Lanpher	Dem
Addison 4	Mari Cordes	Dem	Mari Cordes	Dem/Prog
Addison 4	Caleb Elder	Dem	Caleb Elder	Dem
Addison 5	Harvey Smith	Rep	Harvey Smith	Rep
Addison-Rutland	Terry Norris	Ind	Terry Norris	Ind
Bennington 1	Nelson Brownell	Dem	Nelson Brownell	Dem
Bennington 2–1	Timothy Corcoran II	Dem	Timothy Corcoran II	Dem
Bennington 2–1	Chris Bates	Dem	Dane Whitman	Dem
Bennington 2-2	Jim Carroll	Dem	Michael Nigro	Dem
Bennington 2-2	Mary A. Morrissey	Rep	Mary A. Morrissey	Rep
Bennington 3	David Durfee	Dem	David Durfee	Dem
Bennington 4	Cynthia Browning	Dem	Seth Bongartz	Dem
Bennington 4	Kathleen James	Dem	Kathleen James	Dem
Bennington-Rutland	Linda Joy Sullivan	Dem	Linda Joy Sullivan	Dem/Rep
Caledonia 1	Marcia Martel	Rep	Marcia Martel	Rep
Caledonia 2	Chip Troiano	Dem	Chip Troiano	Dem
Caledonia 3	Scott Beck	Rep	Scott Beck	Rep
Caledonia 3	Scott Campbell	Dem	Scott Campbell	Dem
Caledonia 4	Martha Feltus	Rep	Martha Feltus	Rep
Caledonia 4	Patrick Seymour	Rep	Patrick Seymour	Rep
Caledonia-Washington	Catherine Toll	Dem	Henry Pearl	Dem
Chittenden 1	Marcia Gardner	Dem	Jana Brown	Dem
Chittenden 2	Terence Macaig	Dem	Erin Brady	Dem
Chittenden 2	Jim McCullough	Dem	Jim McCullough	Dem
Chittenden 3	Trevor Squirrell	Dem	Trevor Squirrell	Dem
Chittenden 3	George Till	Dem	George Till	Dem
Chittenden 4–1	Mike Yantachka	Dem	Mike Yantachka	Dem
Chittenden 4–2	Bill Lippert	Dem	Bill Lippert	Dem
Chittenden 5–1	Kate Webb	Dem	Kate Webb	Dem
Chittenden 5–2	Jessica Brumsted	Dem	Jessica Brumsted	Dem
Chittenden 6–1	Carole Ode	Dem	Carole Ode	Dem
Chittenden 6–1	Robert Hooper	Dem	Robert Hooper	Dem
Chittenden 6–2	Jean O'Sullivan	Dem	Emma Mulvaney-Stanak	Prog/Dem
Chittenden 6–3	Jill Krowinski	Dem	Jill Krowinski	Dem
Chittenden 6–3	Curt McCormack	Dem	Curt McCormack	Dem
Chittenden 6–4	Brian Cina	Prog	Brian Cina	Prog/Dem
Chittenden 6–4	Selene Colburn	Prog	Selene Colburn	Prog/Dem
Chittenden 6–5	Johannah Leddy Donovan	Dem	Tiff Bluemle	Dem
Chittenden 6–5	Mary Sullivan	Dem	Gabrielle Stebbins	Dem
Chittenden 6-6	Barbara Rachelson	Dem	Barbara Rachelson	Dem/Prog
Chittenden 6–7	Hal Colston	Dem	Hal Colston	Dem
Chittenden 6–7	Diana Gonzalez	Prog	Taylor Small	Prog/Dem
Chittenden 7–1	Martin LaLonde	Dem	Martin LaLonde	Dem
Chittenden 7–2	Ann Pugh	Dem	Ann Pugh	Dem
Chittenden 7–3	John Killacky	Dem	John Killacky	Dem
Chittenden 7–4	Maida Townsend	Dem	Maida Townsend	Dem
Chittenden 8–1	Marybeth Redmond	Dem	Marybeth Redmond	Dem
Chittenden 8–1	Linda K. Myers	Rep	Tanya Vyhovsky	Prog/Dem
Chittenden 8–2	Dylan Giambatista	Dem	Karen Dolan	Dem
Chittenden 8–2	Lori Houghton	Dem	Lori Houghton	Dem
Chittenden 8–3	Robert Bancroft	Rep	Alyssa Black	Dem
Chittenden 9–1	Seth Chase	Dem	Seth Chase	Dem
Chittenden 9–1	Curt Taylor	Dem	Curt Taylor	Dem
Chittenden 9–2	Sarita Austin	Dem	Sarita Austin	Dem
Chittenden 9–2	Patrick Brennan	Rep	Patrick Brennan	Rep
Chittenden 10	Chris Mattos	Rep	Chris Mattos	Rep
Chittenden 10	John Palasik	Rep	John Palasik	Rep
Essex-Caledonia	Constance Quimby	Rep	Terri Lynn Williams	Rep
Essex-Caledonia-Orleans	Paul Lefebvre	Rep	Paul Lefebvre	Ind
Franklin 1	Carl Rosenquist	Rep	Carl Rosenquist	Rep
Franklin 2	Barbara Murphy	Ind	Barbara Murphy	Ind
Franklin 3–1	Mike McCarthy	Dem	Mike McCarthy	Dem
Franklin 3–1	Casey Toof	Rep	Casey Toof	Rep
Franklin 3–2	Eileen Dickinson	Rep	Eileen Dickinson	Rep/Dem
Franklin 4	Marianna Gamache	Rep	Robert Norris	Rep
Franklin 4	Brian K. Savage	Rep	Brian K. Savage	Rep/Dem
Franklin 5	Charen Fegard	Dem	Paul Martin	Rep
Franklin 5	Lisa Hango	Rep	Lisa Hango	Rep
Franklin 6	James Gregoire	Rep	James Gregoire	Rep/Dem
Franklin 7	Felisha Leffler	Rep	Felisha Leffler	Rep
Grand Isle-Chittenden	Mitzi Johnson	Dem	Michael Morgan	Rep
Grand Isle-Chittenden	Leland Morgan	Rep	Leland Morgan	Rep
Lamoille 1	Heidi Scheuermann	Rep	Heidi Scheuermann	Rep
Lamoille 2	Matthew Hill	Dem	Kate Donnally	Dem
Lamoille 2	Daniel Noyes	Dem	Daniel Noyes	Dem
Lamoille 3	Lucy Rogers	Dem	Lucy Rogers	Dem
Lamoille-Washington	Avram Patt	Dem	Avram Patt	Dem
Lamoille-Washington	David Yacovone	Dem	David Yacovone	Dem
Orange 1	Carl Demrow	Dem	Samantha Lefebvre	Rep
Orange 1	Rodney Graham	Rep	Rodney Graham	Rep
Orange 2	Sarah Copeland Hanzas	Dem	Sarah Copeland Hanzas	Dem
Orange-Caledonia	Chip Conquest	Dem	Joe Parsons	Rep
Orange-Washington-Addison	Jay Hooper	Dem	Jay Hooper	Dem
Orange-Washington-Addison	Peter Reed	Ind	Larry Satcowitz	Dem
Orleans 1	Lynn Batchelor	Rep	Lynn Batchelor	Rep
Orleans 1	Brian Smith	Rep	Brian Smith	Rep/Dem
Orleans 2	Michael Marcotte	Rep	Michael Marcotte	Rep/Dem
Orleans 2	Woody Page	Rep	Woody Page	Rep/Dem
Orleans-Caledonia	Vicki Strong	Rep	Vicki Strong	Rep
Orleans-Caledonia	Samuel Young	Dem	Katherine Sims	Dem
Orleans-Lamoille	Mark Higley	Rep	Mark Higley	Rep/Dem
Rutland-Bennington	Robin Chesnut-Tangerman	Prog	Sally Achey	Rep
Rutland 1	Patricia McCoy	Rep	Patricia McCoy	Rep
Rutland 2	Tom Burditt	Rep	Tom Burditt	Rep
Rutland 2	Dave Potter	Dem	Arthur Peterson	Rep
Rutland 3	Bill Canfield	Rep	Bill Canfield	Rep
Rutland 3	Robert Helm	Rep	Robert Helm	Rep
Rutland 4	Thomas Terenzini	Rep	Thomas Terenzini	Rep
Rutland 5–1	Peter Fagan	Rep	Peter Fagan	Rep
Rutland 5–2	Larry Cupoli	Rep	Larry Cupoli	Rep
Rutland 5–3	Mary Howard	Dem	Mary Howard	Dem
Rutland 5–4	William Notte	Dem	William Notte	Dem
Rutland 6	Stephanie Jerome	Dem	Stephanie Jerome	Dem
Rutland 6	Butch Shaw	Rep	Butch Shaw	Rep/Dem
Rutland-Windsor 1	Jim Harrison	Rep	Jim Harrison	Rep/Dem
Rutland-Windsor 2	Logan Nicoll	Dem	Logan Nicoll	Dem
Washington 1	Anne Donahue	Rep	Anne Donahue	Rep
Washington 1	Patti Lewis	Rep	Kenneth Goslant	Rep
Washington 2	Rob LaClair	Rep	Rob LaClair	Rep
Washington 2	Topper McFaun	Rep	Topper McFaun	Rep
Washington 3	Peter Anthony	Dem	Peter Anthony	Dem
Washington 3	Tommy Walz	Dem	Tommy Walz	Dem
Washington 4	Mary Hooper	Dem	Mary Hooper	Dem
Washington 4	Warren Kitzmiller	Dem	Warren Kitzmiller	Dem
Washington 5	Kimberly Jessup	Dem	Kimberly Jessup	Dem
Washington 6	Janet Ancel	Dem	Janet Ancel	Dem
Washington 7	Maxine Grad	Dem	Maxine Grad	Dem
Washington 7	Kari Dolan	Dem	Kari Dolan	Dem
Washington-Chittenden	Tom Stevens	Dem	Tom Stevens	Dem
Washington-Chittenden	Theresa Wood	Dem	Theresa Wood	Dem
Windham 1	Sara Coffey	Dem	Sara Coffey	Dem
Windham 2–1	Emilie Kornheiser	Dem	Emilie Kornheiser	Dem/Prog
Windham 2-2	Mollie Burke	Prog	Mollie Burke	Prog/Dem
Windham 2–3	Tristan Toleno	Dem	Tristan Toleno	Dem
Windham 3	Carolyn Partridge	Dem	Carolyn Partridge	Dem
Windham 3	Kelley Tully	Dem	Leslie Goldman	Dem
Windham 4	Nader Hashim	Dem	Michelle Bos-Lun	Dem
Windham 4	Mike Mrowicki	Dem	Mike Mrowicki	Dem
Windham 5	Emily Long	Dem	Emily Long	Dem
Windham 6	John Gannon	Dem	John Gannon	Dem
Windham-Bennington	Laura Sibilia	Ind	Laura Sibilia	Ind
Windham-Bennington-Windsor	Kelly Pajala	Ind	Kelly Pajala	Ind
Windsor 1	John Bartholomew	Dem	John Bartholomew	Dem
Windsor 1	Zachariah Ralph	Prog	Elizabeth Burrows	Dem/Prog
Windsor 2	Annmarie Christensen	Dem	John Arrison	Dem
Windsor 3–1	Thomas Bock	Dem	Thomas Bock	Dem
Windsor 3–2	Alice Emmons	Dem	Alice Emmons	Dem
Windsor 3–2	Kristi Morris	Dem	Kristi Morris	Dem
Windsor 4–1	Randall Szott	Rep	Heather Surprenant	Prog/Dem
Windsor 4–2	Kevin Christie	Dem	Kevin Christie	Dem
Windsor 4–2	Rebecca White	Dem	Rebecca White	Dem
Windsor 5	Charlie Kimbell	Dem	Charlie Kimbell	Dem
Windsor-Orange 1	John O'Brien	Dem	John O'Brien	Dem
Windsor-Orange 2	Tim Briglin	Dem	Tim Briglin	Dem
Windsor-Orange 2	Jim Masland	Dem	Jim Masland	Dem
Windsor-Rutland	Sandy Haas	Prog	Kirk White	Dem/Prog

== Retiring incumbents ==
19 incumbent Representatives (13 Democrats, 3 Republicans and 3 Progressives) did not seek reelection in 2020.

1. Bennington 2-1: Chris Bates (D)
2. Caledonia-Washington: Kitty Toll (D)
3. Chittenden 1: Marcia Gardner (D)
4. Chittenden 2: Terence Macaig (D)
5. Chittenden 6-5: Johannah Leddy Donovan (D)
6. Chittenden 6-5: Mary Sullivan (D)
7. Chittenden 6-7: Diana Gonzalez (P)
8. Chittenden 8-1: Linda K. Myers (R)
9. Chittenden 8-2: Dylan Giambatista (D)
10. Essex-Caledonia: Connie Quimby (R)
11. Franklin 4: Marianna Gamache (R)
12. Lamoille 2: Matthew Hill (D)
13. Orange-Caledonia: Chip Conquest (D)
14. Orleans-Caledonia: Samuel Young (D)
15. Windham 4: Nader Hashim (D)
16. Windsor 1: Zachariah Ralph (P)
17. Windsor 2: Annmarie Christensen (D)
18. Windsor 4-1: Randall Szott (D)
19. Windsor-Rutland: Sandy Haas (P)

== Defeated incumbents ==
=== In the primary ===
Two incumbent representatives (both Democrats) sought reelection but were defeated in the August 11 primary.

1. Chittenden 6-2: Jean O'Sullivan (D)
2. Windham 3: Kelley Tully (D)

=== In the general election ===
Eight incumbent representatives (5 Democrats, 1 Republican, 1 Progressive and 1 Independent) sought reelection but were defeated in the November 3 general election

1. Bennington 4: Cynthia Browning (D) (sought reelection as an independent)
2. Chittenden 8-3: Robert Bancroft (R)
3. Franklin 4: Charen Fegard (D)
4. Grand Isle-Chittenden: Mitzi Johnson (D)
5. Orange 1: Carl Demrow (D)
6. Orange-Washington-Addison: Peter Reed (I)
7. Rutland-Bennington: Robin Chesnut-Tangerman (P)
8. Rutland 2: Dave Potter (D)

== Predictions ==
Source	Ranking	As of
The Cook Political Report	Safe D	October 21, 2020

== Detailed results ==
Source for all election results:

=== Addison 1 ===
- Elects two representatives.

Addison 1 general election, 2020
Party	Candidate	Votes	%
Democratic	Amy Sheldon (incumbent)	3,137	44.3
Democratic	Robin Scheu (incumbent)	2,874	40.6
Republican	Thomas Hughes	1,042	14.7
Write-in	Write-ins	31	0.4
Total votes		7,084	100.0
Democratic hold			
Democratic hold			

=== Addison 2 ===
- Elects one representative.

Addison 2 general election, 2020
Party	Candidate	Votes	%
Democratic	Peter Conlon (incumbent)	1,984	88.8
Write-in	Write-ins	251	11.2
Total votes		2,235	100.0
Democratic hold			

=== Addison 3 ===
- Elects two representatives.

Addison 3 general election, 2020
Party	Candidate	Votes	%
Democratic	Matt Birong (incumbent)	2,552	29.0
Democratic	Diane Lanpher (incumbent)	2,522	28.7
Republican	Tim Buskey	2,015	22.9
Republican	Steve Thurston	1,695	19.2
Write-in	Write-ins	6	0.1
Total votes		8,790	100.0
Democratic hold			
Democratic hold			

=== Addison 4 ===
- Elects two representatives.

Addison 4 general election, 2020
Party	Candidate	Votes	%
Democratic	Caleb Elder (incumbent)	3,107	31.9
Democratic	Mari Cordes (incumbent) (Note: Candidate received the nominations of both the Democratic and Progressive parties and was listed on the ballot as "Democratic/Progressive" (candidate is primarily a Democrat).)	2,911	29.9
Republican	Valerie Mullin	1,903	19.6
Republican	Lynn Dike	1,792	18.4
Write-in	Write-ins	18	0.2
Total votes		9,731	100.0
Democratic hold			
Democratic hold			

=== Addison 5 ===
- Elects one representative.

Addison 5 general election, 2020
Party	Candidate	Votes	%
Republican	Harvey Smith (incumbent)	1,331	54.1
Democratic	Jubilee McGill	1,127	45.8
Write-in	Write-ins	4	0.2
Total votes		2,462	100.0
Republican hold			

=== Addison-Rutland ===
- Elects one representative.

Addison-Rutland general election, 2020
Party	Candidate	Votes	%
Independent	Terry Norris (incumbent)	1,281	58.9
Democratic	Ruth Bernstein	725	33.3
Independent	Richard "Sensei" Lenchus	157	7.2
Write-in	Write-ins	11	0.5
Total votes		2,174	100.0
Independent hold			

=== Bennington 1 ===
- Elects one representative.

Bennington 1 general election, 2020
Party	Candidate	Votes	%
Democratic	Nelson Brownell (incumbent)	1,324	83.3
Write-in	Write-ins	265	16.7
Total votes		1,589	100.0
Democratic hold			

=== Bennington 2-1 ===
- Elects two representatives.

Democratic primary

Bennington 2-1 Democratic primary
Party	Candidate	Votes	%
Democratic	Timothy Corcoran II (incumbent)	804	44.1
Democratic	Dane Whitman	780	42.8
Democratic	Michael Louis Stern	232	12.7
Democratic	Write-ins	7	0.3
Total votes		1,823	100.0

General election

Bennington 2-1 general election, 2020
Party	Candidate	Votes	%
Democratic	Timothy Corcoran II (incumbent)	2,220	42.1
Democratic	Dane Whitman	1,889	35.8
Republican	Colleen Harrington	1,116	21.1
Write-in	Write-ins	51	1.0
Total votes		5,276	100.0
Democratic hold			
Democratic hold			

=== Bennington 2-2 ===
- Elects two representatives.

Bennington 2-2 general election, 2020
Party	Candidate	Votes	%
Republican	Mary A. Morrissey (incumbent)	1,940	34.4
Democratic	Michael Nigro	1,491	26.4
Democratic	Jim Carroll (incumbent)	1,416	25.1
Independent	Peter Brady Sr.	773	13.7
Write-in	Write-ins	21	0.4
Total votes		5,641	100.0
Republican hold			
Democratic hold			

=== Bennington 3 ===
- Elects one representative.

Republican primary

Bennington 3 Republican primary
Party	Candidate	Votes	%
Republican	Victor Harwood Jr.	163	52.9
Republican	Francis Kinney	138	44.8
Republican	Write-ins	7	2.3
Total votes		308	100.0

General election

Bennington 3 general election, 2020
Party	Candidate	Votes	%
Democratic	David Durfee (incumbent)	1,331	57.8
Republican	Victor Harwood Jr.	967	42.0
Write-in	Write-ins	6	0.2
Total votes		2,304	100.0
Democratic hold			

=== Bennington 4 ===
- Elects two representatives.

Democratic primary

Bennington 4 Democratic primary
Party	Candidate	Votes	%
Democratic	Kathleen James (incumbent)	1,320	47.2
Democratic	Seth Bongartz	1,057	37.8
Democratic	Jamie Dufour	336	12.0
Democratic	Write-ins	81	2.9
Total votes		2,794	100.0

General election

Bennington 4 general election, 2020
Party	Candidate	Votes	%
Democratic	Kathleen James (incumbent)	2,797	36.7
Democratic	Seth Bongartz	2,651	34.7
Independent	Cynthia Browning (incumbent) (Note: Elected in 2018 as a Democrat.)	2,111	27.7
Write-in	Write-ins	68	0.9
Total votes		7,627	100.0
Democratic hold			
Democratic hold			

=== Bennington-Rutland ===
- Elects two representatives.

Bennington-Rutland general election, 2020
Party	Candidate	Votes	%
Democratic	Linda Joy Taylor (incumbent) (Note: Candidate received the nominations of both the Democratic and Republican parties and was listed on the ballot as "Democratic/Republican" (candidate is primarily a Democrat).)	2,235	97.6
Write-in	Write-ins	56	2.4
Total votes		2,291	100.0
Democratic hold			

=== Caledonia 1 ===
- Elects one representative.

Caledonia 1 general election, 2020
Party	Candidate	Votes	%
Republican	Marcia Martell (incumbent)	1,547	63.5
Progressive	Dylan Stetson	876	36.0
Write-in	Write-ins	12	0.5
Total votes		2,435	100.0
Republican hold			

=== Caledonia 2 ===
- Elects one representative.

Caledonia 2 general election, 2020
Party	Candidate	Votes	%
Democratic	Chip Troiano (incumbent)	1,305	58.9
Republican	James Clark	905	40.8
Write-in	Write-ins	6	0.3
Total votes		2,216	100.0
Democratic hold			

=== Caledonia 3 ===
- Elects two representatives.

Caledonia 3 general election, 2020
Party	Candidate	Votes	%
Republican	Scott Beck (incumbent)	1,807	31.2
Democratic	Scott Campbell (incumbent)	1,689	29.2
Republican	Frank Empsall	1,206	20.8
Democratic	Brice Simon	1,087	18.8
Write-in	Write-ins	11	0.2
Total votes		5,789	100.0
Republican hold			
Democratic hold			

=== Caledonia 4 ===
- Elects two representatives.

Caledonia 4 general election, 2020
Party	Candidate	Votes	%
Republican	Martha Feltus (incumbent)	2,198	33.1
Republican	Patrick Seymour (incumbent)	1,857	28.0
Democratic	Dennis Labounty	1,596	24.1
Democratic	David Hammond	972	14.6
Write-in	Write-ins	8	0.1
Total votes		6,631	100.0
Republican hold			
Republican hold			

=== Caledonia-Washington ===
- Elects one representative.

Democratic primary

Caledonia-Washington Democratic primary
Party	Candidate	Votes	%
Democratic	Henry Pearl	520	48.8
Democratic	Peter Griffin	350	32.9
Democratic	Gwendolyn Hallsmith	195	18.3
Total votes		1,065	100.0

General election

Caledonia-Washington general election, 2020
Party	Candidate	Votes	%
Democratic	Henry Pearl	1,931	68.5
Republican	Bruce Melendy	878	31.1
Write-in	Write-ins	10	0.4
Total votes		2,819	100.0
Democratic hold			

=== Chittenden 1 ===
- Elects one representative.

Chittenden 1 general election, 2020
Party	Candidate	Votes	%
Democratic	Jana Brown	1,800	65.6
Independent	Terry Moultroup	937	34.1
Write-in	Write-ins	8	0.3
Total votes		2,745	100.0
Democratic hold			

=== Chittenden 2 ===
- Elects two representatives.

Chittenden 2 general election, 2020
Party	Candidate	Votes	%
Democratic	Erin Brady	4,120	39.4
Democratic	Jim McCullough (incumbent)	3,674	35.1
Republican	Tony O'Rourke	2,647	25.3
Write-in	Write-ins	18	0.2
Total votes		10,459	100.0
Democratic hold			
Democratic hold			

=== Chittenden 3 ===
- Elects two representatives.

Chittenden 3 general election, 2020
Party	Candidate	Votes	%
Democratic	Trevor Squirrell (incumbent)	3,381	32.2
Democratic	George Till (incumbent)	3,363	32.0
Republican	Paul Gross	1,735	16.5
Republican	Benjamin Mutolo	1,500	14.3
Independent	Tomas Cummings	526	5.0
Write-in	Write-ins	4	0.0
Total votes		10,509	100.0
Democratic hold			
Democratic hold			

=== Chittenden 4-1 ===
- Elects one representative.

Chittenden 4-1 general election, 2020
Party	Candidate	Votes	%
Democratic	Mike Yantachka (incumbent)	2,231	98.3
Write-in	Write-ins	39	0.7
Total votes		2,270	100.0
Democratic hold			

=== Chittenden 4-2 ===
- Elects one representative.

Democratic primary

Chittenden 4-2 Democratic primary
Party	Candidate	Votes	%
Democratic	Bill Lippert (incumbent)	723	61.6
Democratic	Christina Deeley	451	35.4
Total votes		1,174	100.0

Republican primary

Chittenden 4-2 Republican primary
Party	Candidate	Votes	%
Republican	Sarah Toscano	180	56.3
Republican	Dean Rolland	137	42.8
Republican	Write-ins	3	0.9
Total votes		320	100.0

General election

Chittenden 4-2 general election, 2020
Party	Candidate	Votes	%
Democratic	Bill Lippert (incumbent)	1,974	67.1
Republican	Sarah Toscano	963	32.8
Write-in	Write-ins	3	0.1
Total votes		2,940	100.0
Democratic hold			

=== Chittenden 5-1 ===
- Elects one representative.

Chittenden 5-1 general election, 2020
Party	Candidate	Votes	%
Democratic	Kate Webb (incumbent)	2,488	98.6
Write-in	Write-ins	35	1.4
Total votes		2,523	100.0
Democratic hold			

=== Chittenden 5-2 ===
- Elects one representative.

Chittenden 5-2 general election, 2020
Party	Candidate	Votes	%
Democratic	Jessica Brumsted (incumbent)	2,265	97.2
Write-in	Write-ins	66	2.8
Total votes		2,331	100.0
Democratic hold			

=== Chittenden 6-1 ===
- Elects two representatives.

Chittenden 6-1 general election, 2020
Party	Candidate	Votes	%
Democratic	Carol Ode (incumbent)	3,641	51.4
Democratic	Robert Hooper (incumbent)	3,305	46.7
Write-in	Write-ins	131	1.9
Total votes		7,077	100.0
Democratic hold			
Democratic hold			

=== Chittenden 6-2 ===
- Elects one representative.

Democratic primary

Chittenden 6-2 Democratic primary
Party	Candidate	Votes	%
Democratic	Emma Mulvaney-Stanak	728	57.6
Democratic	Jean O'Sullivan (incumbent)	527	41.7
Democratic	Write-ins	8	0.6
Total votes		1,263	100.0

General election

Chittenden 6-2 general election, 2020
Party	Candidate	Votes	%
Progressive	Emma Mulvaney-Stanak (Note: Candidate received the nominations of both the Progressive and Democratic parties and was listed on the ballot as "Progressive/Democratic" (candidate is primarily a Progressive).)	2,223	67.1
Write-in	Write-ins	80	0.1
Total votes		2,303	100.0
Progressive gain from Democratic			

=== Chittenden 6-3 ===
- Elects two representatives.

Chittenden 6-3 general election, 2020
Party	Candidate	Votes	%
Democratic	Jill Krowinski (incumbent)	3,321	54.6
Democratic	Curt McCormack (incumbent)	2,717	44.7
Write-in	Write-ins	42	0.7
Total votes		6,080	100.0
Democratic hold			
Democratic hold			

=== Chittenden 6-4 ===
- Elects two representatives.

Chittenden 6-4 general election, 2020
Party	Candidate	Votes	%
Progressive	Selene Colburn (incumbent)	2,147	52.9
Progressive	Brian Cina (incumbent)	1,858	45.8
Write-in	Write-ins	52	1.3
Total votes		4,057	100.0
Progressive hold			
Progressive hold			

=== Chittenden 6-5 ===
- Elects two representative.

Democratic primary

Chittenden 6-5 Democratic primary
Party	Candidate	Votes	%
Democratic	Tiff Bluemle	1,662	35.5
Democratic	Gabrielle Stebbins	1,210	25.8
Democratic	Scott Pavek	773	16.5
Democratic	Jesse Paul Warren	772	16.5
Democratic	Annie Wohland	259	5.5
Democratic	Write-ins	7	0.1
Total votes		4,683	100.0

General election

Chittenden 6-5 general election, 2020
Party	Candidate	Votes	%
Democratic	Tiff Bluemle	3,713	45.1
Democratic	Gabrielle Stebbins	3,470	42.2
Independent	Tom Licata	1,016	12.3
Write-in	Write-ins	29	0.4
Total votes		8,228	100.0
Democratic hold			
Democratic hold			

=== Chittenden 6-6 ===
- Elects one representative.

Chittenden 6-6 general election, 2020
Party	Candidate	Votes	%
Democratic	Barbara Rachelson (incumbent)	1,082	97.9
Write-in	Write-ins	23	2.1
Total votes		1,105	100.0
Democratic hold			

=== Chittenden 6-7 ===
- Elects two representatives.

Democratic primary

Chittenden 6-7 Democratic primary
Party	Candidate	Votes	%
Democratic	Taylor Small	1,003	44.9
Democratic	Hal Colston (incumbent)	912	40.8
Democratic	Jordan Matte	316	14.1
Democratic	Write-ins	4	0.2
Total votes		2,235	100.0

General election

Chittenden 6-7 general election, 2020
Party	Candidate	Votes	%
Democratic	Hal Colston (incumbent)	2,551	43.5
Progressive	Taylor Small	2,423	41.3
Independent	James Ehlers	867	14.8
Write-in	Write-ins	28	0.5
Total votes		5,869	100.0
Democratic hold			
Progressive hold			

=== Chittenden 7-1 ===
- Elects one representative.

Chittenden 7-1 general election, 2020
Party	Candidate	Votes	%
Democratic	Martin LaLonde (incumbent)	2,345	98.2
Write-in	Write-ins	42	1.8
Total votes		2,387	100.0
Democratic hold			

=== Chittenden 7-2 ===
- Elects one representative.

Chittenden 7-2 general election, 2020
Party	Candidate	Votes	%
Democratic	Ann Pugh (incumbent)	2,385	70.1
Republican	Steve Fisher	1,015	29.8
Write-in	Write-ins	1	0.0
Total votes		3,401	100.0
Democratic hold			

=== Chittenden 7-3 ===
- Elects one representative.

Chittenden 7-3 general election, 2020
Party	Candidate	Votes	%
Democratic	John Killacky (incumbent)	2,506	98.2
Write-in	Write-ins	46	1.8
Total votes		2,552	100.0
Democratic hold			

=== Chittenden 7-4 ===
- Elects one representative.

Chittenden 7-4 general election, 2020
Party	Candidate	Votes	%
Democratic	Maida Townsend (incumbent)	2,292	98.8
Write-in	Write-ins	27	1.2
Total votes		2,319	100.0
Democratic hold			

=== Chittenden 8-1 ===
- Elects two representatives.

Democratic primary

Chittenden 8-1 Democratic primary
Party	Candidate	Votes	%
Democratic	Marybeth Redmond (incumbent)	1,359	48.6
Democratic	Tanya Vyhovsky	762	27.2
Democratic	Brian Shelden	666	23.8
Democratic	Write-ins	11	0.4
Total votes		2,798	100.0

General election

Chittenden 8-1 general election, 2020
Party	Candidate	Votes	%
Democratic	Marybeth Redmond (incumbent)	3,234	34.2
Progressive	Tanya Vyhovsky	2,273	24.0
Republican	Thomas Nelson	1,840	19.5
Republican	Maryse Dunbar	1,793	18.9
Libertarian	V. Chase	302	3.2
Write-in	Write-ins	17	0.2
Total votes		9,459	100.0
Democratic hold			
Progressive gain from Republican			

=== Chittenden 8-2 ===
- Elects two representatives.

Democratic primary

Chittenden 8-2 Democratic primary
Party	Candidate	Votes	%
Democratic	Lori Houghton (incumbent)	1,446	45.4
Democratic	Karen Dolan	1,113	35.0
Democratic	Patrick Murray	605	19.0
Democratic	Write-ins	19	0.6
Total votes		3,183	100.0

General election

Chittenden 8-2 general election, 2020
Party	Candidate	Votes	%
Democratic	Lori Houghton (incumbent)	3,828	36.6
Democratic	Karen Dolan	3,474	33.3
Republican	Edmond Daudelin	1,605	15.4
Republican	Brett Gaskill	1,525	14.6
Write-in	Write-ins	14	0.1
Total votes		10,446	100.0
Democratic hold			
Democratic hold			

=== Chittenden 8-3 ===
- Elects one representative.

Chittenden 8-3 general election, 2020
Party	Candidate	Votes	%
Democratic	Alyssa Black	1,455	50.1
Republican	Robert Bancroft (incumbent)	1,141	39.3
Independent	Brett Gaskill	303	10.4
Write-in	Write-ins	3	0.1
Total votes		2,902	100.0
Democratic gain from Republican			

=== Chittenden 9-1 ===
- Elects two representatives.

Chittenden 9-1 general election, 2020
Party	Candidate	Votes	%
Democratic	Curt Taylor (incumbent)	2,182	33.8
Democratic	Seth Chase (incumbent)	1,885	29.2
Republican	Doug Wood	1,261	19.5
Republican	Deserae Morin	1,107	17.2
Write-in	Write-ins	15	0.2
Total votes		6,450	100.0
Democratic hold			
Democratic hold			

=== Chittenden 9-2 ===
- Elects two representatives.

Republican primary

Chittenden 9-2 Republican primary
Party	Candidate	Votes	%
Republican	Patrick Brennan (incumbent)	684	56.7
Republican	Jon Lynch	391	32.4
Republican	Alex Darr	121	10.0
Republican	Write-ins	10	0.8
Total votes		1,206	100.0

General election

Chittenden 9-2 general election, 2020
Party	Candidate	Votes	%
Republican	Patrick Brennan (incumbent)	2,815	37.9
Democratic	Sarita Austin (incumbent)	2,582	34.8
Republican	Jon Lynch	1,995	26.9
Write-in	Write-ins	34	0.4
Total votes		7,392	100.0
Republican hold			
Democratic hold			

=== Chittenden 10 ===
- Elects two representatives.

Chittenden 10 general election, 2020
Party	Candidate	Votes	%
Republican	John Palasik (incumbent)	2,660	29.1
Republican	Chris Mattos (incumbent)	2,642	28.9
Democratic	Emily Hecker	1,832	20.0
Democratic	Ember Quinn	1,599	17.5
Progressive	Todd Buik	409	4.5
Write-in	Write-ins	11	0.1
Total votes		9,153	100.0
Republican hold			
Republican hold			

=== Essex-Caledonia ===
- Elects two representatives.

Essex-Caledonia general election, 2020
Party	Candidate	Votes	%
Republican	Terri Lynn Williams	1,229	62.2
Democratic	Clem Bissonnette	732	37.0
Write-in	Write-ins	16	0.8
Total votes		1,977	100.0
Republican hold			

=== Essex-Caledonia-Orleans ===
- Elects two representatives.

Essex-Caledonia-Orleans general election, 2020
Party	Candidate	Votes	%
Independent	Paul Lefebvre (incumbent) (Note: Elected in 2018 as Republican.)	1,067	52.4
Democratic	Martha Allen	958	47.1
Write-in	Write-ins	10	0.5
Total votes		2,035	100.0
Independent gain from Republican			

=== Franklin 1 ===
Republican primary

Franklin 1 Republican primary
Party	Candidate	Votes	%
Republican	Carl Rosenquist (incumbent)	501	56.7
Republican	Sydney McLean-Lipinski	66	10.0
Total votes		1,206	100.0

General election

Franklin 1 general election, 2020
Party	Candidate	Votes	%
Republican	Carl Rosenquist (incumbent)	1,623	57.5
Independent	Ben Chiappinelli	1,192	42.2
Write-in	Write-ins	8	0.3
Total votes		2,823	100.0
Republican hold			

=== Franklin 2 ===
- Elects one representatives.

Franklin 2 general election, 2020
Party	Candidate	Votes	%
Independent	Barbara Murphy (incumbent)	2,484	97.9
Write-in	Write-ins	53	2.1
Total votes		2,537	100.0
Independent hold			

=== Franklin 3-1 ===
- Elects two representatives.

Franklin 3-1 general election, 2020
Party	Candidate	Votes	%
Republican	Casey Toof (incumbent)	2,429	33.6
Democratic	Mike McCarthy (incumbent)	2,022	28.0
Democratic	Dave Glidden	1,274	17.6
Republican	Bruce Cheeseman	1,226	17.0
Independent	Wayne Billado III	265	3.7
Write-in	Write-ins	13	0.2
Total votes		7,229	100.0
Republican hold			
Democratic hold			

=== Franklin 3-2 ===
- Elects one representative.

Franklin 3-2 general election, 2020
Party	Candidate	Votes	%
Republican	Eileen Dickinson (incumbent) (Note: Candidate received the nominations of both the Republican and Democratic parties and was listed on the ballot as "Republican/Democratic" (candidate is primarily a Republican).)	2,141	97.1
Write-in	Write-ins	65	2.9
Total votes		2,206	100.0
Republican hold			

=== Franklin 4 ===
- Elects two representatives.

Franklin 4 general election, 2020
Party	Candidate	Votes	%
Republican	Brian K. Savage (incumbent)	2,460	38.6
Republican	Robert Norris	2,440	38.3
Democratic	Nicholas Brosseau	1,422	22.3
Write-in	Write-ins	51	0.8
Total votes		6,373	100.0
Republican hold			
Republican hold			

=== Franklin 5 ===
- Elects two representatives.

Franklin 5 general election, 2020
Party	Candidate	Votes	%
Republican	Lisa Hango (incumbent)	2,371	35.3
Republican	Paul Martin	2,056	30.6
Democratic	Charen Fegard (incumbent)	1,261	18.8
Democratic	Daniel Nadeau	1,014	15.1
Write-in	Write-ins	18	0.3
Total votes		6,720	100.0
Republican hold			
Republican gain from Democratic			

=== Franklin 6 ===
- Elects one representative.

Franklin 6 general election, 2020
Party	Candidate	Votes	%
Republican	James Gregoire (incumbent)	2,287	97.2
Write-in	Write-ins	67	2.8
Total votes		2,354	100.0
Republican hold			

=== Franklin 7 ===
- Elects one representative.

Franklin 7 general election, 2020
Party	Candidate	Votes	%
Republican	Felisha Leffler (incumbent)	1,178	58.8
Progressive	Dennis Williams	820	40.9
Write-in	Write-ins	7	0.3
Total votes		2,005	100.0
Republican hold			

=== Grand Isle-Chittenden ===
- Elects two representatives.

Grand Isle-Chittenden general election, 2020
Party	Candidate	Votes	%
Republican	Leland Morgan (incumbent)	2,776	26.6
Republican	Michael Morgan	2,627	25.2
Democratic	Mitzi Johnson (incumbent)	2,607	25.0
Democratic	Andy Julow	2,404	23.1
Write-in	Write-ins	8	0.1
Total votes		10,422	100.0
Republican hold			
Republican gain from Democratic			

=== Lamoille 1 ===
- Elects one representative.

Lamoille 1 general election, 2020
Party	Candidate	Votes	%
Republican	Heidi Schuermann (incumbent)	1,925	57.7
Democratic	Jo Sabel Courtney	1,403	42.1
Write-in	Write-ins	8	0.2
Total votes		3,336	100.0
Republican hold			

=== Lamoille 2 ===
- Elects two representatives.

Lamoille 2 general election, 2020
Party	Candidate	Votes	%
Democratic	Kate Donnally	2,350	32.3
Democratic	Daniel Noyes (incumbent)	2,118	29.1
Republican	Richard Bailey	1,436	19.7
Republican	Shayne Spence	1,357	18.7
Write-in	Write-ins	11	0.2
Total votes		7,272	100.0
Democratic hold			
Democratic hold			

=== Lamoille 3 ===
- Elects one representative.

Lamoille 3 general election, 2020
Party	Candidate	Votes	%
Democratic	Lucy Rogers (incumbent)	1,903	73.2
Republican	Ferron Wambold	695	26.7
Write-in	Write-ins	3	0.1
Total votes		2,601	100.0
Democratic hold			

=== Lamoille-Washington ===
- Elects two representatives.

Lamoille-Washington general election, 2020
Party	Candidate	Votes	%
Democratic	David Yacovone (incumbent)	3,391	40.2
Democratic	Avram Patt (incumbent)	2,499	29.6
Republican	Tyler Machia	1,282	15.2
Republican	Shannara Johnson	1,241	14.7
Write-in	Write-ins	14	0.2
Total votes		8,427	100.0
Democratic hold			
Democratic hold			

=== Orange 1 ===
- Elects two representatives.

Democratic primary

Orange 1 Democratic primary
Party	Candidate	Votes	%
Democratic	Carl Demrow (incumbent)	695	38.4
Democratic	Kate Maclean	688	38.0
Democratic	Susan Hatch Davis	405	22.4
Democratic	Write-ins	21	1.2
Total votes		1,809	100.0

Republican primary

Orange 1 Republican primary
Party	Candidate	Votes	%
Republican	Rodney Graham (incumbent)	715	42.8
Republican	Samantha Lefebvre	472	28.2
Republican	Levar Cole	453	27.1
Republican	Write-ins	32	1.9
Total votes		1,672	100.0

General election

Orange 1 general election, 2020
Party	Candidate	Votes	%
Republican	Rodney Graham (incumbent)	2,169	26.0
Republican	Samantha Lefebvre	1,774	21.3
Democratic	Kate Maclean	1,734	20.8
Democratic	Carl Demrow (incumbent)	1,562	18.7
Progressive	Susan Hatch Davis	725	8.7
Independent	Rama Schneider	356	4.3
Write-in	Write-ins	13	0.2
Total votes		8,333	100.0
Republican hold			
Republican gain from Democratic			

=== Orange 2 ===
- Elects one representative.

Orange 2 general election, 2020
Party	Candidate	Votes	%
Democratic	Sarah Copeland Hanzas (incumbent)	1,439	59.6
Republican	Zachary Lang	963	39.9
Write-in	Write-ins	11	0.5
Total votes		2,413	100.0
Democratic hold			

=== Orange-Caledonia ===
- Elects one representative.

Orange-Caledonia general election, 2020
Party	Candidate	Votes	%
Republican	Joe Parsons	1,321	56.5
Democratic	Kelsey Root-Winchester	1,013	43.3
Write-in	Write-ins	4	0.2
Total votes		2,338	100.0
Republican gain from Democratic			

=== Orange-Washington-Addison ===
- Elects two representatives.

Orange-Washington-Addison general election, 2020
Party	Candidate	Votes	%
Democratic	Jay Hooper (incumbent)	2,886	35.2
Democratic	Larry Satcowitz	1,666	20.3
Republican	Charles Russell	1,262	15.4
Independent	Peter Reed (incumbent)	1,046	12.8
Republican	Joseph Roche	934	11.4
Independent	Kevin Doering	390	4.8
Write-in	Write-ins	18	0.2
Total votes		8,202	100.0
Democratic hold			
Democratic gain from Independent			

=== Orleans 1 ===
- Elects two representatives.

Orleans 1 general election, 2020
Party	Candidate	Votes	%
Republican	Brian Smith (incumbent)	2,967	50.1
Republican	Lynn Batchelor (incumbent)	2,830	47.8
Write-in	Write-ins	121	2.0
Total votes		5,918	100.0
Republican hold			
Republican hold			

=== Orleans 2 ===
- Elects two representatives.

Orleans 2 general election, 2020
Party	Candidate	Votes	%
Republican	Michael Marcotte (incumbent)	3,097	53.4
Republican	Woody Page (incumbent)	2,628	45.3
Write-in	Write-ins	74	1.3
Total votes		5,799	100.0
Republican hold			
Republican hold			

=== Orleans-Caledonia ===
- Elects two representatives.

Republican primary

Orleans-Caledonia Republican primary
Party	Candidate	Votes	%
Republican	Vicki Strong (incumbent)	724	9.9
Republican	Jeannine Young	389	9.4
Republican	Tabitha Armstrong	192	4.7
Republican	Frank Huard	119	4.7
Republican	Write-ins	11	4.7
Total votes		29,454	100.0

General election

Orleans-Caledonia general election, 2020
Party	Candidate	Votes	%
Republican	Vicki Strong (incumbent)	2,376	30.8
Democratic	Katherine Sims	2,132	27.6
Republican	Jeannine Young	1,632	21.1
Democratic	John Elwell	1,298	16.8
Independent	Frank Huard	278	3.6
Write-in	Write-ins	6	0.1
Total votes		7,722	100.0
Republican hold			
Democratic hold			

=== Orleans-Lamoille ===
- Elects one representative.

Orleans-Lamoille general election, 2020
Party	Candidate	Votes	%
Republican	Mark Higley (incumbent)	2,003	98.2
Write-in	Write-ins	36	1.8
Total votes		2,039	100.0
Republican hold			

=== Rutland-Bennington ===
- Elects one representative.

Rutland-Bennington general election, 2020
Party	Candidate	Votes	%
Republican	Sally Achey	1,417	50.4
Progressive	Robin Chesnut-Tangerman (incumbent)	1,385	49.3
Write-in	Write-ins	7	0.3
Total votes		2,809	100.0
Republican gain from Progressive			

=== Rutland 1 ===
- Elects one representative.

Rutland 1 general election, 2020
Party	Candidate	Votes	%
Republican	Patricia McCoy (incumbent)	1,283	71.1
Independent	Tyler-Joseph Ballard	513	28.4
Write-in	Write-ins	8	0.4
Total votes		1,804	100.0
Republican hold			

=== Rutland 2 ===
- Elects two representatives.

Rutland 2 general election, 2020
Party	Candidate	Votes	%
Republican	Tom Burditt (incumbent)	2,424	28.1
Republican	Arthur Peterson	2,192	25.4
Democratic	Dave Potter (incumbent)	2,150	24.9
Democratic	Ken Fredette	1,853	21.5
Write-in	Write-ins	11	0.1
Total votes		8,630	100.0
Republican hold			
Republican gain from Democratic			

=== Rutland 3 ===
- Elects one representative.

Rutland 3 general election, 2020
Party	Candidate	Votes	%
Republican	Bill Canfield (incumbent)	2,604	39.9
Republican	Robert Helm (incumbent)	2,207	33.8
Democratic	Bob Richards	1,671	25.6
Write-in	Write-ins	52	0.8
Total votes		6,534	100.0
Republican hold			
Republican hold			

=== Rutland 4 ===
- Elects one representative.

Rutland 4 general election, 2020
Party	Candidate	Votes	%
Republican	Thomas Terezini (incumbent)	1,306	54.0
Democratic	Barbara Pulling	1,107	45.8
Write-in	Write-ins	4	0.2
Total votes		2,417	100.0
Republican hold			

=== Rutland 5-1 ===
- Elects one representative.

Rutland 5-1 general election, 2020
Party	Candidate	Votes	%
Republican	Peter Fagan (incumbent)	1,932	96.7
Write-in	Write-ins	66	3.3
Total votes		1,998	100.0
Republican hold			

=== Rutland 5-2 ===
- Elects one representative.

Rutland 5-2 general election, 2020
Party	Candidate	Votes	%
Republican	Larry Cupoli (incumbent)	1,606	95.3
Write-in	Write-ins	79	4.7
Total votes		1,685	100.0
Republican hold			

=== Rutland 5-3 ===
- Elects one representative.

Rutland 5-3 general election, 2020
Party	Candidate	Votes	%
Democratic	Mary Howard (incumbent)	806	55.2
Republican	John Cioffi Jr.	639	43.7
Write-in	Write-ins	16	1.1
Total votes		1,461	100.0
Democratic hold			

=== Rutland 5-4 ===
- Elects one representative.

Rutland 5-4 general election, 2020
Party	Candidate	Votes	%
Democratic	William Notte (incumbent)	1,020	54.5
Republican	Sherri Prouty	847	45.3
Write-in	Write-ins	3	0.2
Total votes		1,870	100.0
Democratic hold			

=== Rutland 6 ===
- Elects two representatives.

Rutland 6 general election, 2020
Party	Candidate	Votes	%
Republican	Butch Shaw (incumbent)	2,803	41.2
Democratic	Stephanie Jerome (incumbent)	2,112	31.0
Republican	David Soulia	1,869	27.5
Write-in	Write-ins	19	0.3
Total votes		6,803	100.0
Republican hold			
Democratic hold			

=== Rutland-Windsor 1 ===
- Elects one representative.

Rutland-Windsor 1 general election, 2020
Party	Candidate	Votes	%
Republican	Jim Harrison (incumbent)	2,641	98.1
Write-in	Write-ins	50	1.9
Total votes		2,691	100.0
Republican hold			

=== Rutland-Windsor 2 ===
- Elects one representative.

Rutland-Windsor 2 general election, 2020
Party	Candidate	Votes	%
Democratic	Logan Nicoll (incumbent)	2,091	95.3
Write-in	Write-ins	102	4.7
Total votes		2,193	100.0
Democratic hold			

=== Washington 1 ===
- Elects two representatives.

Democratic primary

Washington 1 Democratic primary
Party	Candidate	Votes	%
Democratic	Denise MacMartin	747	50.5
Democratic	Rob Lehmert	411	27.8
Democratic	Gordon Bock	273	18.5
Democratic	Write-ins	47	3.8
Total votes		1,478	100.0

General election

Washington 1 general election, 2020
Party	Candidate	Votes	%
Republican	Anne Donahue (incumbent)	2,225	32.4
Republican	Kenneth Goslant	1,891	27.5
Democratic	Denise MacMartin	1,529	22.2
Democratic	Rob Lehmert	966	14.1
Berlin-Northfield Alliance	Gordon Bock	251	3.7
Write-in	Write-ins	13	0.2
Total votes		6,875	100.0
Republican hold			
Republican hold			

=== Washington 2 ===
- Elects two representatives.

Washington 2 general election, 2020
Party	Candidate	Votes	%
Republican	Rob LaClair (incumbent)	3,437	49.5
Republican	Topper McFaun (incumbent)	3,426	49.4
Write-in	Write-ins	74	1.1
Total votes		6,937	100.0
Republican hold			
Republican hold			

=== Washington 3 ===
- Elects two representatives.

Washington 3 general election, 2020
Party	Candidate	Votes	%
Democratic	Peter Anthony (incumbent)	1,911	30.0
Democratic	Tommy Walz (incumbent)	1,800	28.3
Republican	Karen Lauzon	1,429	22.4
Republican	John Steinman	1,219	19.1
Write-in	Write-ins	8	0.1
Total votes		6,367	100.0
Democratic hold			
Democratic hold			

=== Washington 4 ===
- Elects one representative.

Washington 4 general election, 2020
Party	Candidate	Votes	%
Democratic	Mary Hooper (incumbent)	3,897	47.0
Democratic	Warren Kitzmiller (incumbent)	3,189	38.5
Progressive	Glennie Sewell	1,107	13.4
Write-in	Write-ins	97	1.2
Total votes		8,290	100.0
Democratic hold			
Democratic hold			

=== Washington 5 ===
- Elects one representative.

Washington 5 general election, 2020
Party	Candidate	Votes	%
Democratic	Kimberly Jessup (incumbent)	1,991	71.8
Independent	Matthew Sellers	769	27.7
Write-in	Write-ins	13	0.5
Total votes		2,773	100.0
Democratic hold			

=== Washington 6 ===
- Elects one representative.

Washington 6 general election, 2020
Party	Candidate	Votes	%
Democratic	Janet Ancel (incumbent)	1,929	70.9
Vets for Vets	Lewis Graham Jr.	769	28.3
Write-in	Write-ins	23	0.8
Total votes		2,721	100.0
Democratic hold			

=== Washington 7 ===
- Elects one representative.

Washington 7 general election, 2020
Party	Candidate	Votes	%
Democratic	Kari Dolan (incumbent)	4,027	48.9
Democratic	Maxine Grad (incumbent)	3,970	48.2
Write-in	Write-ins	236	2.9
Total votes		8,233	100.0
Democratic hold			
Democratic hold			

=== Washington-Chittenden ===
- Elects one representative.

Washington-Chittenden general election, 2020
Party	Candidate	Votes	%
Democratic	Theresa Wood (incumbent)	3,751	39.4
Democratic	Thomas Stevens (incumbent)	3,133	32.9
Independent	Chris Viens	1,417	14.9
Republican	Brock Corderre	1,188	12.5
Write-in	Write-ins	31	0.3
Total votes		9,250	100.0
Democratic hold			
Democratic hold			

=== Windham 1 ===
- Elects one representative.

Windham 1 general election, 2020
Party	Candidate	Votes	%
Democratic	Sara Coffey (incumbent)	2,136	96.5
Write-in	Write-ins	77	3.5
Total votes		2,213	100.0
Democratic hold			

=== Windham 2-1 ===
- Elects one representative.

Windham 2-1 general election, 2020
Party	Candidate	Votes	%
Democratic	Emilie Kornheiser (incumbent)	1,709	75.3
Republican	Richard Morton	560	24.6
Write-in	Write-ins	2	0.1
Total votes		2,271	100.0
Democratic hold			

=== Windham 2-2 ===
- Elects one representative.

Windham 2-2 general election, 2020
Party	Candidate	Votes	%
Progressive	Mollie Burke (incumbent)	1,834	98.7
Write-in	Write-ins	24	1.3
Total votes		1,858	100.0
Progressive hold			

=== Windham 2-3 ===
- Elects one representative.

Windham 2-3 general election, 2020
Party	Candidate	Votes	%
Democratic	Tristan Toleno (incumbent)	1,808	98.5
Write-in	Write-ins	27	1.5
Total votes		1,835	100.0
Democratic hold			

=== Windham 3 ===
- Elects two representatives.

Democratic primary

Windham 3 Democratic primary
Party	Candidate	Votes	%
Democratic	Leslie Goldman	804	35.4
Democratic	Carolyn Partridge (incumbent)	771	33.9
Democratic	Kelley Tully (incumbent)	689	30.3
Democratic	Write-ins	8	0.4
Total votes		2,272	100.0

General election

Windham 3 general election, 2020
Party	Candidate	Votes	%
Democratic	Leslie Goldman	2,182	38.8
Democratic	Carolyn Partridge (incumbent)	2,032	36.2
Independent	Ryan Coyne	1,295	23.0
Write-in	Write-ins	111	2.0
Total votes		5,620	100.0
Democratic hold			
Democratic hold			

=== Windham 4 ===
- Elects two representatives.

Democratic primary

Windham 4 Democratic primary
Party	Candidate	Votes	%
Democratic	Mike Mrowicki (incumbent)	1,633	45.9
Democratic	Michelle Bos-Lun	1,515	42.6
Democratic	Mathew Ingram	197	5.5
Democratic	David Ramos	135	3.8
Democratic	Robert Depino	71	2.0
Democratic	Write-ins	5	0.1
Total votes		3,556	100.0

General election

Windham 4 general election, 2020
Party	Candidate	Votes	%
Democratic	Mike Mrowicki (incumbent)	3,357	49.9
Democratic	Michelle Bos-Lun	3,259	48.4
Write-in	Write-ins	117	1.7
Total votes		6,733	100.0
Democratic hold			
Democratic hold			

=== Windham 5 ===
- Elects one representative.

Windham 5 general election, 2020
Party	Candidate	Votes	%
Democratic	Emily Long (incumbent)	2,037	97.2
Write-in	Write-ins	58	2.8
Total votes		2,095	100.0
Democratic hold			

=== Windham 6 ===
- Elects one representative.

Windham 6 general election, 2020
Party	Candidate	Votes	%
Democratic	John Gannon (incumbent)	1,324	59.2
Republican	Amy Kamstra	906	40.5
Write-in	Write-ins	8	0.3
Total votes		2,238	100.0
Democratic hold			

=== Windham-Bennington ===
- Elects one representative.

Windham-Bennington general election, 2020
Party	Candidate	Votes	%
Independent	Laura Sibilia (incumbent)	1,520	63.4
Republican	Matthew Somverille	867	36.1
Write-in	Write-ins	11	0.5
Total votes		2,398	100.0
Independent hold			

=== Windham-Bennington-Windsor ===
- Elects one representative.

Windham-Bennington-Windsor general election, 2020
Party	Candidate	Votes	%
Independent	Kelly Pajala (incumbent)	2,539	98.2
Write-in	Write-ins	43	1.8
Total votes		2,402	100.0
Independent hold			

=== Windsor 1 ===
- Elects two representatives.

Democratic primary

Windsor 1 Democratic primary
Party	Candidate	Votes	%
Democratic	John Bartholomew (incumbent)	948	45.9
Democratic	Elizabeth Burrows	647	42.6
Democratic	Jennifer Grant	641	5.5
Democratic	Paul Belaski	561	3.8
Democratic	Write-ins	17	0.1
Total votes		3,556	100.0

General election

Windsor 1 general election, 2020
Party	Candidate	Votes	%
Democratic	John Bartholomew (incumbent)	2,735	33.2
Democratic	Elizabeth Burrows	2,148	26.1
Republican	Jacob Holmes	1,452	17.6
Republican	Wesley Raney	1,176	14.3
Independent	John MacGovern	691	8.4
Write-in	Write-ins	30	0.4
Total votes		8,232	100.0
Democratic hold			
Democratic gain from Progressive			

=== Windsor 2 ===
- Elects one representative.

Democratic primary

Windsor 2 Democratic primary
Party	Candidate	Votes	%
Democratic	Daniel Boyer	265	54.6
Democratic	Tyler Harwell	210	43.3
Democratic	Write-ins	10	2.1
Total votes		485	100.0

General election
Democratic nominee Daniel Boyer withdrew before the general election and was replaced by John Arrison.

Windsor 2 general election, 2020
Party	Candidate	Votes	%
Democratic	John Arrison	1,101	44.5
Republican	Michael Kell Sr.	1,059	42.8
Independent	Sean Whalen	309	12.5
Write-in	Write-ins	6	0.2
Total votes		2,475	100.0
Democratic hold			

=== Windsor 3-1 ===
- Elects one representative.

Windsor 3-1 general election, 2020
Party	Candidate	Votes	%
Democratic	Thomas Bock (incumbent)	1,453	44.5
Republican	Chester Alden	872	42.8
Write-in	Write-ins	9	0.2
Total votes		2,334	100.0
Democratic hold			

=== Windsor 3-2 ===
- Elects two representatives.

Windsor 3-2 general election, 2020
Party	Candidate	Votes	%
Democratic	Kristi Morris (incumbent)	2,248	30.4
Democratic	Alice Emmons (incumbent)	2,169	29.4
Republican	Stuart Beam	1,608	21.8
Republican	Randy Gray	1,330	18.0
Write-in	Write-ins	26	0.4
Total votes		7,381	100.0
Democratic hold			
Democratic hold			

=== Windsor 4-1 ===
- Elects one representative.

Democratic primary

Windsor 4-1 Democratic primary
Party	Candidate	Votes	%
Democratic	Heather Surprenant	423	51.8
Democratic	Havah Armstrong Walther	390	47.8
Democratic	Write-ins	3	0.4
Total votes		816	100.0

General election

Windsor 4-1 general election, 2020
Party	Candidate	Votes	%
Progressive	Heather Surprenant	1,616	60.5
Republican	Mark Donka	1,049	39.3
Write-in	Write-ins	6	0.2
Total votes		2,671	100.0
Progressive gain from Republican			

=== Windsor 4-2 ===
- Elects two representatives.

Windsor 4-2 general election, 2020
Party	Candidate	Votes	%
Democratic	Coach Kristie (incumbent)	2,789	35.8
Democratic	Rebecca White (incumbent)	2,698	34.6
Republican	Alice Flanders	1,608	20.6
Progressive	Nicholas Bramlage	666	8.5
Write-in	Write-ins	33	0.4
Total votes		7,794	100.0
Democratic hold			
Democratic hold			

=== Windsor 5 ===
- Elects one representative.

Windsor 5 general election, 2020
Party	Candidate	Votes	%
Democratic	Charlie Kimbell (incumbent)	2,454	97.7
Write-in	Write-ins	57	2.3
Total votes		2,511	100.0
Democratic hold			

=== Windsor-Orange 1 ===
- Elects one representative.

Windsor-Orange 1 general election, 2020
Party	Candidate	Votes	%
Democratic	John O'Brien (incumbent)	1,868	94.4
Write-in	Write-ins	110	5.6
Total votes		1,978	100.0
Democratic hold			

=== Windsor-Orange 2 ===
- Elects two representatives.

Windsor-Orange 1 general election, 2020
Party	Candidate	Votes	%
Democratic	Jim Masland (incumbent)	4,726	49.1
Democratic	Tim Brigland (incumbent)	4,703	48.8
Write-in	Write-ins	203	2.1
Total votes		9,632	100.0
Democratic hold			

=== Windsor-Rutland ===
- Elects one representative.

Democratic primary

Windsor-Rutland Democratic primary
Party	Candidate	Votes	%
Democratic	Kirk White	738	51.8
Democratic	Robert Krattli	390	47.8
Democratic	Write-ins	13	0.4
Total votes		816	100.0

General election

Windsor-Rutland general election, 2020
Party	Candidate	Votes	%
Democratic	Kirk White	1,522	58.1
Republican	Wayne Townsend	1,069	40.8
Write-in	Write-ins	30	1.1
Total votes		2,621	100.0
Democratic gain from Progressive			

== See also ==
- 2020 Vermont elections
- 2020 United States elections
- 2020 United States House of Representatives election in Vermont
- 2020 Vermont gubernatorial election
- 2020 Vermont elections
