= Kitzmiller =

Kitzmiller may refer to:

== People ==
- John Kitzmiller (1913–1965), African-American actor
- Johnny Kitzmiller (1904–1986), American football player and member of the College Football Hall of Fame
- Karen B. Kitzmiller (1947-2002), American politician
- Warren Kitzmiller (1943-2022), American politician

== See also ==
- Kitzmiller v. Dover Area School District, 2005 United States court case
- Kitzmiller, Maryland, a town in the United States
