= Catherine Beattie =

Catherine Beattie may refer to:

- Catherine Beattie (politician) (1921–2014), American politician
- Catherine Beattie (bowls) (born 1981), Northern Irish lawn and indoor bowler
