= Jickling =

Jickling is a surname. Notable people with the surname include:

- Ben Jickling (fl. 2017–2019), American politician
- Henry Jickling (c. 1800–1873), Australian judge
- Mark Jickling (fl. 1980s), musician in the American band Half Japanese
