= Paul Lefebvre =

Paul Lefebvre may refer to:

- Paul Lefebvre (Canadian politician), Canadian member of parliament
- Paul E. Lefebvre, United States Marine Corps general
- Paul Lefebvre (American politician), member of the Vermont House of Representatives
- Paul Lefebvre, a character in The Bureau
