= Michael Hoyt (politician) =

American politician from Vermont

Member of the Vermont House of Representatives from the Windsor 4 district
- Incumbent
- Assumed office December 2, 2025
- Preceded by: Heather Surprenant

Personal details
- Party: Democratic

Michael (Mike) Hoyt is an American politician from Vermont. He has been a Democratic member of the Vermont House of Representatives for the Windsor 4 District since 2025. He was appointed to replace Heather Surprenant by Governor Phil Scott. He is a Hartford select board member.
