= Eileen Dickinson =

Vermont state representative

Member of the Vermont House of Representatives from the Franklin-2 district
- Incumbent
- Assumed office January 4, 2023
- Preceded by: Barbara Murphy

Member of the Vermont House of Representatives from the Franklin-3-2 district
- In office January 9, 2013 – January 4, 2023
- Preceded by: District created
- Succeeded by: District dissolved

Member of the Vermont House of Representatives from the Franklin-2 district
- In office January 7, 2009 – January 9, 2013
- Preceded by: George Allard
- Succeeded by: John I. Mitchell

Personal details
- Born: October 8, 1949 (age 76) Teaneck, New Jersey, U.S.
- Party: Republican

Eileen Dickinson (born October 8, 1949) is an American politician who has served in the Vermont House of Representatives since 2009.

== Electoral history ==
Eileen Dickinson electoral history

2008 Vermont House of Representatives Franklin 2 district election
Primary election
Party	Candidate	Votes	%
Republican	Eileen Dickinson	110	54.19%
Republican	Tracie Rivard Higgins	71	34.98%
Write-in		22	10.84%
Total votes		203	100.00%
General election
Democratic	Richard J. Howrigan (incumbent)	2,018	26.20%
Republican	Eileen Dickinson	1,984	25.76%
Democratic	Greg Christie	1,756	22.80%
Independent	George Allard	1,331	17.28%
Republican	Tracie Rivard Higgins	605	7.86%
Write-in		8	0.10%
Total votes		7,702	100.00%

2010 Vermont House of Representatives Franklin 2 district election
Primary election
Party	Candidate	Votes	%
Republican	Eileen Dickinson (incumbent)	523	46.20%
Republican	George Allard	291	25.71%
Republican	James Gregoire	256	22.61%
Write-in		62	5.48%
Total votes		1,132	100.00%
	Blank and spoiled	266	
General election
Republican	Eileen Dickinson (incumbent)	1,933	30.99%
Democratic	Richard J. Howrigan (incumbent)	1,576	25.26%
Republican	George Allard	1,388	22.25%
Democratic	William Roberts	1,030	16.51%
Independent	Todd Pritsky	311	4.99%
Total votes		6,238	100.00%

2012 Vermont House of Representatives Franklin 3-2 district election
Primary election
Party	Candidate	Votes	%
Republican	Eileen Dickinson (incumbent)	185	96.86%
Write-in		6	3.14%
Total votes		191	100.00%
	Blank and spoiled	19	
General election
Republican	Eileen Dickinson (incumbent)	1,715	98.51%
Write-in		26	1.49%
Total votes		1,741	100.00%
	Blank and spoiled	190	

2014 Vermont House of Representatives Franklin 3-2 district election
Primary election
Party	Candidate	Votes	%
Republican	Eileen Dickinson (incumbent)	143	96.62%
Write-in		5	3.38%
Total votes		148	100.00%
	Blank and spoiled	22	
General election
Republican	Eileen Dickinson (incumbent)	1,120	98.77%
Write-in		14	1.23%
Total votes		1,134	100.00%
	Blank and spoiled	151	

2016 Vermont House of Representatives Franklin 3-2 district election
Primary election
Party	Candidate	Votes	%
Republican	Eileen Dickinson (incumbent)	383	94.80%
Write-in		21	5.20%
Total votes		404	100.00%
	Blank and spoiled	58	
General election
Republican	Eileen Dickinson (incumbent)	1,261	61.72%
Democratic	David Abell McWilliams	772	37.79%
Write-in		10	0.49%
Total votes		2,043	100.00%
	Blank and spoiled	86	

2018 Vermont House of Representatives Franklin 3-2 district election
Primary election
Party	Candidate	Votes	%
Republican	Eileen Dickinson (incumbent)	289	97.64%
Write-in		7	2.36%
Total votes		296	100.00%
	Blank and spoiled	42	
General election
Republican	Eileen Dickinson (incumbent)		
Democratic	Eileen Dickinson (incumbent)		
Total	Eileen Dickinson (incumbent)	1,215	68.45%
Independent	David Abell McWilliams	560	31.55%
Total votes		1,775	100.00%
	Blank and spoiled	114	

2020 Vermont House of Representatives Franklin 3-2 district election
Primary election
Party	Candidate	Votes	%
Republican	Eileen Dickinson (incumbent)	461	98.09%
Write-in		9	1.91%
Total votes		470	100.00%
	Blank and spoiled	58	
General election
Republican	Eileen Dickinson (incumbent)		
Democratic	Eileen Dickinson (incumbent)		
Total	Eileen Dickinson (incumbent)	2,141	97.05%
Write-in		65	2.95%
Total votes		2,206	100.00%
	Blank and spoiled	353	

2022 Vermont House of Representatives Franklin 2 district election
Primary election
Party	Candidate	Votes	%
Republican	Eileen Dickinson (incumbent)	219	98.21%
Write-in		4	1.79%
Total votes		223	100.00%
	Blank and spoiled	19	
General election
Republican	Eileen Dickinson (incumbent)		
Democratic	Eileen Dickinson (incumbent)		
Total	Eileen Dickinson (incumbent)	1,577	99.18%
Write-in		13	0.82%
Total votes		1,590	100.00%
	Blank and spoiled	338	

2024 Vermont House of Representatives Franklin 2 district election
Primary election
Party	Candidate	Votes	%
Republican	Eileen Dickinson (incumbent)	284	94.67%
Write-in		16	5.33%
Total votes		300	100.00%
	Blank and spoiled	5	
General election
Republican	Eileen Dickinson (incumbent)		
Democratic	Eileen Dickinson (incumbent)		
Total	Eileen Dickinson (incumbent)	2,028	96.07%
Write-in		83	3.93%
Total votes		2,111	100.00%
	Blank and spoiled	374	
