= Alyssa Black =

American politician

Member of the Vermont House of Representatives from the Chittenden 24 district
- Incumbent
- Assumed office January 6, 2021
- Preceded by: Robert Bancroft

Personal details
- Born: Alyssa Hughes Fredonia, New York, U.S.
- Party: Democratic
- Spouse: Rob Black
- Children: 3 (1 deceased)
- Education: University of Vermont

Alyssa Black is an American politician serving as a member of the Vermont House of Representatives for the Chittenden-24 district. Elected in November 2020, she assumed office on January 6, 2021.

== Early life and education ==
Born and raised in Fredonia, New York, Black graduated from Fredonia High School. She attended the University of Vermont.

== Career ==
Outside of politics, Black works as a healthcare administrator for a medical practice in Williston, Vermont. She was elected to the Vermont House of Representatives in November 2020 and assumed office on January 6, 2021.

== Personal life ==
Black and her ex-husband, Rob, had three children. In 2018, Black's son, Andrew, committed suicide the same day he purchased a handgun. When joining the legislature Black advocated for legislation that would require waiting periods between firearm purchases and possession. In 2023 her sponsored legislation H.230, became law. Act 45 created a safe storage provision in Vermont statute, expanded existing extreme risk protection orders, and mandated a 72 hour waiting period between purchase and possession of firearms. https://legislature.vermont.gov/Documents/2024/Docs/ACTS/ACT045/ACT045%20As%20Enacted.pdf
