= Fredonia High School (New York) =

Location
- 425 E. Main Street; Fredonia, New York; United States
- Coordinates: 42°26′27″N 79°20′2″W

Information
- Type: Public high school
- Established: 1851
- School district: Fredonia Central Schools
- NCES School ID: 361152000907
- Principal: Darrin Paschke
- Staff: 47.63 (FTE)
- Faculty: 70
- Grades: 9-12
- Student to teacher ratio: 10.27
- Colors: Black and Orange
- Athletics: Basketball, Football, Soccer, Cross Country, Wrestling, Softball, Baseball, Tennis, Swimming, Track and Field, Girls' Volleyball, Golf, Bowling, Indoor Track
- Mascot: Hillbilly
- Newspaper: The Spectator
- Website: http://www.fredonia.wnyric.org

Fredonia High School is a public high school in Fredonia, New York.

The Fredonia Central School District owns two campuses, Wheelock and the Main Campus, but the entire student population is currently at the Main Campus due to declining enrollment. The Wheelock building housed the entire school district until there was not enough room for the large incoming classes. When the school was at Wheelock, Fredonia's yearbook was called The Hilltopper which has led people to believe that this was actually the school mascot, however, the mascot has always been the Hillbilly. The graduating class of 2006 had 145 students, but the 2012 graduating class had approximately 100.

== Academics ==
In 2009, Fredonia High School ranked 30th out of 131 Western New York high schools in terms of academic performance.

== Sports ==
Nine Fredonia students won a total of ten New York State individual championships between 1978 and 2006 in diving, wrestling and track and field. The boys' baseball team was the State Class B champion in 2006 and in 2013.

== Noted alumni ==
- Don Reinhoudt (class of 1963), first and only 4 time-in-a-row IPF World Powerlifting Superheavyweight Champion (1973 - 1976)
- Jeff Shaver, former MLB player
- Jenn Suhr (class of 2000), American pole vaulter, Olympic Silver Medalist in Beijing 2008 also Olympic Gold Medalist London 2012, and holder of the American women's pole vault record
- George Borrello (class of 1985), New York State Senator (2019—present)
- Alyssa Black, politician
