= Emilie Kornheiser =

American politician

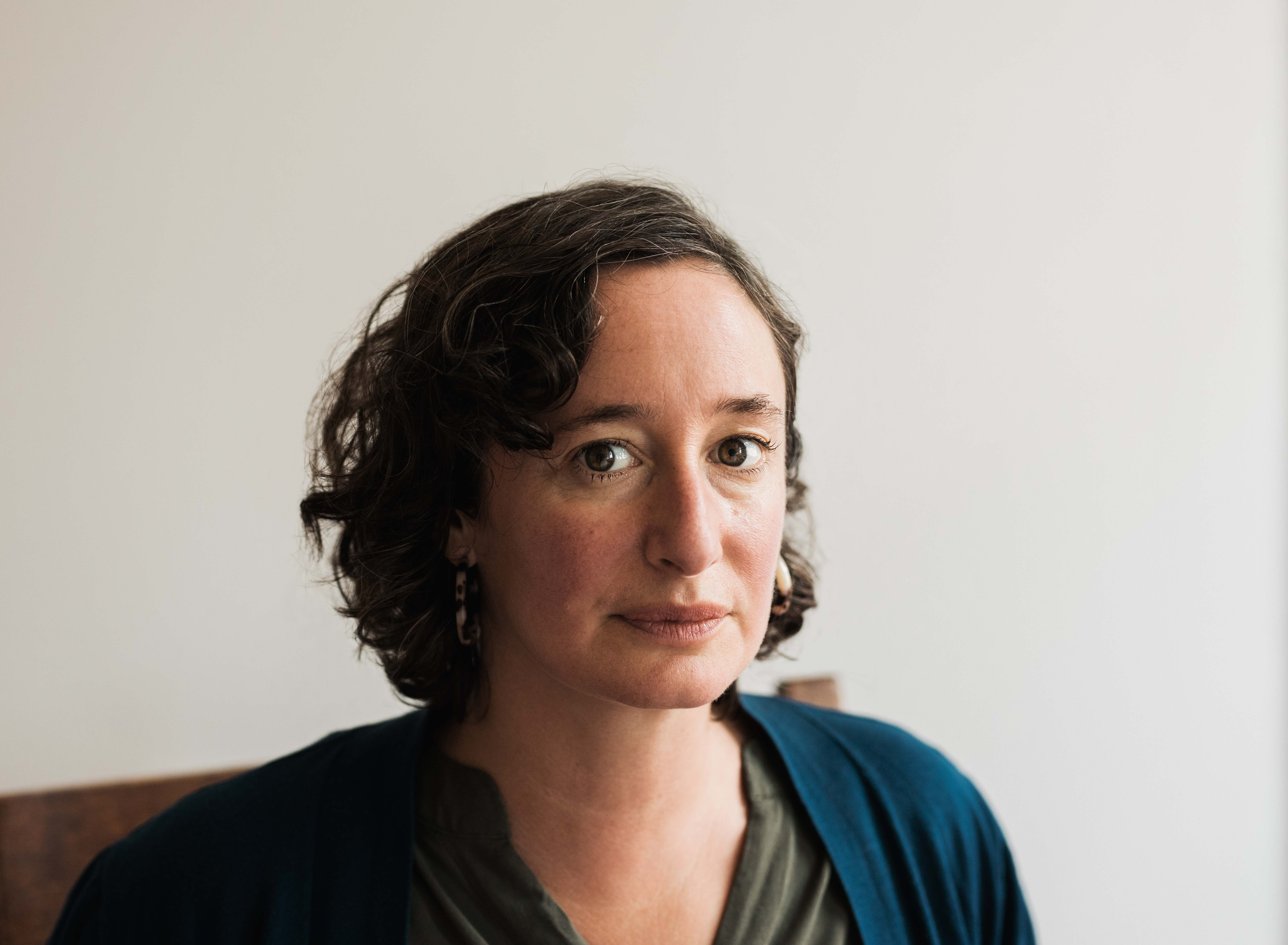

Member of the Vermont House of Representatives from the Windham district
- Incumbent
- Assumed office January 9, 2019
- Preceded by: Valerie Stuart

Personal details
- Born: Louisville, Kentucky, U.S.
- Party: Democratic
- Children: 1
- Education: Marlboro College (BA)

Emilie Kornheiser (born 1978/1979) is an American politician who serves as a member of the Vermont House of Representatives from the Windham district as a member of the Democratic Party.

== Early life and education ==
Emilie Kornheiser was born in Louisville, Kentucky, and was raised in New York. She graduated with a Bachelor of Arts degree in sociology from Marlboro College. She has one child. She was appointed to the Vermont Commission on Women by Speaker Mitzi Johnson in 2017. She is Jewish.

== Vermont House of Representatives ==
Kornheiser defeated Valerie Stuart, a member of the Vermont House of Representatives who had not faced opposition during her tenure, in the 2018 primary and won without opposition in the general election. She defeated Republican nominee Richard Morton in the 2020 election. She serves on the Government Accountability committee and as Chair of the Ways and Means committee.

Kornheiser is a sponsor of right to repair legislation.

In 2024, Kornheiser sponsored legislation that would place a new tax on wealthy residents.

== Electoral history ==
2018 Vermont House of Representatives Windham 2-1 district election
Primary election
Party	Candidate	Votes	%
Democratic	Emilie Kornheiser	589	72.09%
Democratic	Valerie Stuart (incumbent)	227	27.78%
Write-in		1	0.12%
Total votes		817	100.00%
	Blank and spoiled	16	
General election
Progressive	Emilie Kornheiser		
Democratic	Emilie Kornheiser		
Total	Emilie Kornheiser	1,473	98.66%
Write-in		20	1.34%
Total votes		1,493	100.00%
	Blank and spoiled	278	

2020 Vermont House of Representatives Windham 2-1 district election
Primary election
Party	Candidate	Votes	%
Democratic	Emilie Kornheiser (incumbent)	813	99.75%
Write-in		2	0.25%
Total votes		815	100.00%
	Blank and spoiled	89	
General election
Progressive	Emilie Kornheiser (incumbent)		
Democratic	Emilie Kornheiser (incumbent)		
Total	Emilie Kornheiser (incumbent)	1,709	75.25%
Republican	Richard Morton	560	24.66%
Write-in		2	0.09%
Total votes		2,271	100.00%
	Blank and spoiled	144	

2022 Vermont House of Representatives Windham-7 district election
Primary election
Party	Candidate	Votes	%
Democratic	Emilie Kornheiser (incumbent)	670	99.85%
Write-in		1	0.15%
Total votes		671	100.00%
	Blank and spoiled	91	
General election
Democratic	Emilie Kornheiser (incumbent)	1,211	73.62%
Republican	Terry Martin	433	26.32%
Write-in		1	0.06%
Total votes		1,645	100.00%
	Blank and spoiled	49	

2024 Vermont House of Representatives Windham-7 district election
Primary election
Party	Candidate	Votes	%
Democratic	Emilie Kornheiser (incumbent)	505	57.78%
Democratic	Amanda Ellis-Thurber	369	42.22%
Total votes		874	100.00%
	Blank and spoiled	3	
General election
Democratic	Emilie Kornheiser (incumbent)	1,363	66.91%
Republican	Susan Murray	646	31.71%
Write-in		28	1.37%
Total votes		2,037	100.00%
	Blank and spoiled	108	
