= Elizabeth Burrows =

American politician from Vermont

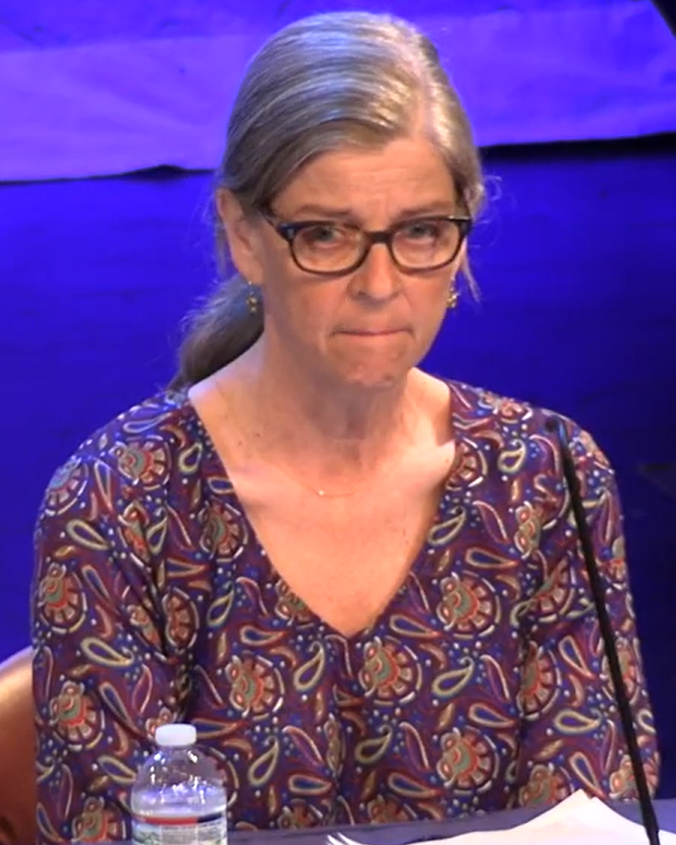
- Burrows in 2026

Member of the Vermont House of Representatives from the Windsor-1 District district
- Incumbent
- Assumed office January 6, 2021

Personal details
- Party: Democratic

Elizabeth Burrows is an American politician from Vermont. She has been a Democratic member of the Vermont House of Representatives for the Windsor-1 District since 2021.
