= Annmarie Christensen =

American politician and member of the Vermont State House of Representatives

Member of the Vermont House of Representatives from the Windsor 2 district
- In office 2017–2021
- Preceded by: Mark Huntley
- Succeeded by: John Arrison

Personal details
- Born: Allentown, Pennsylvania
- Party: Democratic
- Children: 2
- Education: Misericordia University(BA)Marlboro College (MA)

Annmarie Christensen is an American politician who served in the Vermont House of Representatives from 2017 to 2021.
