= Maxine Grad =

American politician (born 1960)

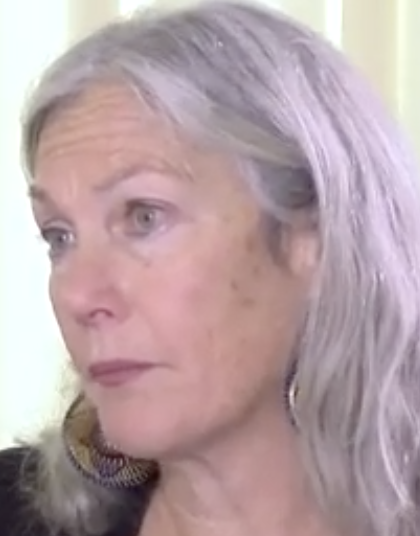
- Grad in 2017

Member of the Vermont House of Representatives from the Washington 7 district
- Incumbent
- Assumed office January 9, 2000
- Preceded by: Tony Klein

Member of the Vermont House of Representatives from the Washington 2 district
- In office 2001–Current
- Preceded by: Elaine Alfano; Donny Osman
- Succeeded by: Tom Koch; Francis McFaun

Member of the Vermont House of Representatives from the Washington 1 district
- In office January 3, 2001 – January 8, 2003
- Preceded by: Paul B. Knox; Alan H. Weiss
- Succeeded by: Kinny Connell

Personal details
- Born: August 10, 1960 (age 65) Great Neck, New York, U.S.
- Party: Democratic
- Children: 3
- Education: Clark University (BA); Vermont Law School (JD)

Maxine Grad (born August 10, 1960) is an American politician and member of the Democratic Party who has served in the Vermont House of Representatives since 2001.

Grad chairs the House Judiciary Committee. She also serves on the Joint Legislative Justice Oversight Committee and the Judicial Nominating Board.

She resides in Vermont with her husband and three children.
