= Charen Fegard =

American politician

Charen Fegard is an American politician.

Fegard was born on Howard Air Force Base in Panama. She was one of two members elected to the Vermont House of Representatives Franklin-5 district in 2018, alongside Joshua Aldrich, who resigned without taking his seat. Fegard lost reelection in 2020 to Paul Martin.
