= Ela Chapin =

American politician from Vermont

Member of the Vermont House of Representatives from the Washington 5 district
- Incumbent
- Assumed office January 4, 2023
- Preceded by: Kimberly Jessup

Personal details
- Born: Calais, Vermont
- Party: Democratic
- Education: Brown University; Tufts University

Elanor Chapin is an American politician from Vermont. She has been a Democratic member of the Vermont House of Representatives for the Washington 5 District since 2023. She is Jewish.
