= Kelley Tully =

American politician from Vermont

Member of the Vermont House of Representatives from the Windham 3 District district
- In office April 11, 2020 – January 6, 2021
- Preceded by: Matt Trieber
- Succeeded by: Leslie Goldman

Personal details
- Born: Rockingham, Vermont
- Party: Democratic

Kelley Tully is an American politician from Vermont. She was a Democratic member of the Vermont House of Representatives.

Governor Phil Scott appointed her to replace Matt Trieber in the Vermont House of Representatives.
