= Stephen Beyor =

American politician and member of the Vermont State House of Representatives

Member of the Vermont House of Representatives from the Franklin-5 district
- In office 2012–2019
- Succeeded by: Joshua Aldrich (elect); Lisa Hango

Personal details
- Born: Highgate, Vermont
- Party: Republican
- Children: 2

Stephen Beyor is an American politician who served in the Vermont House of Representatives from 2012 to 2019.
