= Heather Surprenant =

American politician

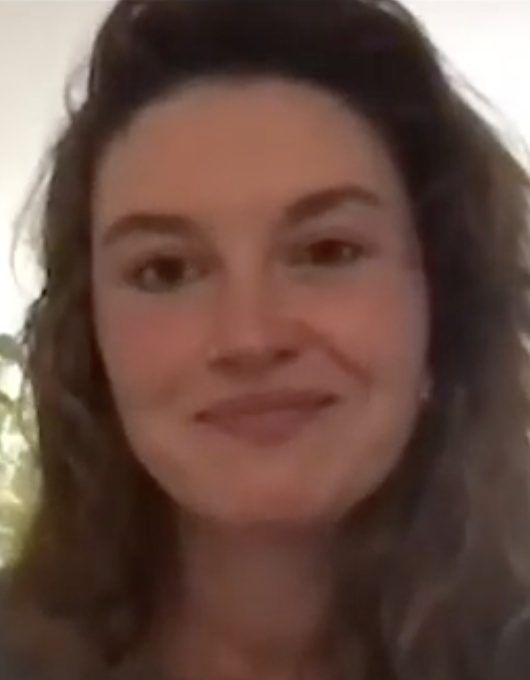
- Surprenant in 2020

Member of the Vermont House of Representatives from the Windsor-4-1 district
- In office 2021 – September 29, 2025
- Preceded by: Randall Szott
- Succeeded by: Michael Hoyt

Personal details
- Born: Randolph, Vermont, U.S.
- Party: Vermont Progressive
- Other political affiliations: Democratic
- Education: Smith College (BA)

Heather Surprenant is an American politician and farmer who served in the Vermont House of Representatives from the Windsor-4 district as a member of the Vermont Progressive Party. She served as Vice Chair of the Committee on Agriculture, Food Resiliency and Forestry.

== Early life and education ==
Heather Surprenant was born in Randolph, Vermont. She graduated from Smith College with a Bachelor of Arts degree in government. She lived in San Francisco, California, for two years after graduating from Smith College and then moved back to Vermont. During her time in California she worked at an organic farm in Half Moon Bay, California.

== Vermont House of Representatives ==
Surprenant ran for a seat in the Vermont House of Representatives from the Windsor-4-1 district during the 2020 election. She received the Vermont Progressive nomination and defeated Havah Armstrong Walther for the Democratic nomination. During the campaign she was endorsed by Senator Bernie Sanders. She won in the general election against Republican nominee Mark Donka.

== Electoral history ==
2020 Vermont House of Representatives Windsor-4-1 district election
Primary election
Party	Candidate	Votes	%
Democratic	Heather Surprenant	423	51.84%
Democratic	Havah Armstrong Walther	390	47.79%
Write-in		3	0.37%
Total votes		816	100.00%
	Blank	76	
General election
Progressive	Heather Surprenant		
Democratic	Heather Surprenant		
Total	Heather Surprenant	1,616	60.50%
Republican	Mark Donka	1,049	39.27%
Write-in		6	0.22%
Total votes		2,671	100.00%
	Blank	198	
	Spoiled	1	

2022 Vermont House of Representatives Windsor 4 district election
Primary election
Party	Candidate	Votes	%
Democratic	Heather Surprenant (incumbent)	721	99.72%
Write-in		2	0.28%
Total votes		723	100.00%
	Blank	173	
General election
Democratic	Heather Surprenant (incumbent)	1,902	96.40%
Write-in		71	3.60%
Total votes		1,973	100.00%
	Blank	434	
	Spoiled	4	

2024 Vermont House of Representatives Windsor 4 district election
Primary election
Party	Candidate	Votes	%
Democratic	Heather Surprenant (incumbent)	396	99.75%
Write-in		1	0.25%
Total votes		397	100.00%
	Blank	65	
General election
Democratic	Heather Surprenant (incumbent)	2,050	95.62%
Write-in		94	3.38%
Total votes		2,144	100.00%
	Blank	724	

== Personal ==
Surprenant is a member of the LGBTQ community.
