= Lynn Batchelor =

American politician from Vermont

Member of the Vermont House of Representatives from the Orleans-1 District district
- In office 2011 – October 21, 2021
- Succeeded by: Larry Labor

Personal details
- Party: Republican

Lynn Batchelor is an American politician from Vermont. She was a Republican member of the Vermont House of Representatives for the Orleans-1 District from 2011 to 2021. Her district contained the towns of Brownington, Charleston, Derby, Holland, and Morgan.

In 2014, Batchelor was appointed to the state women's commission. In 2021, she retired to Florida.
