= Richard Lawrence (politician) =

American politician (1942–2022)

Member of the Vermont House of Representatives from the Caledonia 4 district
- In office 2005–2019
- Preceded by: Howard Crawford
- Succeeded by: Patrick Seymour

Personal details
- Born: July 5, 1942 St. Johnsbury, Vermont, U.S.
- Died: November 24, 2022 (aged 80) Lyndonville, Vermont, U.S.
- Party: Republican
- Education: University of New Hampshire

Richard Hoyt Lawrence (July 5, 1942 – November 24, 2022) was an American Republican politician who represented the Caledonia 4 district in the Vermont House of Representatives from 2005 until 2019. He retired and was succeeded in the 2018 election by Patrick Seymour.

== Background ==
Lawrence was born in St. Johnsbury, Vermont,. He lived in Lyndonville, Vermont, and graduated from Lyndon Institute in 1960. He received his bachelor's degree in animal science from University of New Hampshire in 1962. He was involved with the dairy farming at his farm.

== Death ==
Lawrence died on November 24, 2022, at the age of 80.
