= Terry Norris (American politician) =

American politician

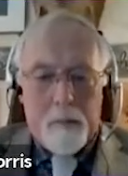

Member of the Vermont House of Representatives from the Addison-Rutland district
- In office 2017–2023
- Preceded by: Alyson Eastman
- Succeeded by: Joseph Andriano

Personal details
- Born: Terry Emerson Norris
- Party: Independent
- Children: 1
- Education: Tri-State College (BS)

Terry Emerson Norris is an American farmer and politician who served as a member of the Vermont House of Representatives from the Addison-Rutland district as an independent.

== Early life and education ==
Terry Emerson Norris was born in Vermont to Kenneth Milton Norris and Helen Mae Buck as the youngest of fifteen children. He was raised in Shoreham, Vermont, and graduated from Shoreham High School in 1966, where he was president in the seventh grade and treasurer in the eleventh grade. Norris graduated from Tri-State College with a Bachelor of Science in electrical engineering in 1970. He worked as a dairy farmer from 1970 to 2008, with two of his brothers. He married Diane Madeleine Dubois on July 11, 1992. He served on the school board for St. Mary’s School.

== Vermont House of Representatives ==
In January 2017, Alyson Eastman, an independent member of the Vermont House of Representatives, was appointed by Governor Phil Scott to serve as the Deputy Secretary of Agriculture. Norris was appointed to replace Eastman as he is also an independent. He defeated Democratic nominee Barbara Wilson in the 2018 election. He won reelection in the 2020 election against Democratic nominee Ruth Shattuck Bernstein and independent candidate Richard Lenchus.

He served on the Agriculture and Forestry committee. He endorsed Scott Milne, the Republican nominee, during the 2020 lieutenant gubernatorial election.

== Electoral history ==
2018 Vermont House of Representatives Addison-Rutland district election
Party	Candidate	Votes	%
Independent	Terry Norris (incumbent)	1,009	57.69%
Democratic	Barbara Wilson	735	42.02%
Write-in		5	0.29%
Total votes		1,749	100.00%
	Blank and spoiled	66	

2020 Vermont House of Representatives Addison-Rutland district election
Party	Candidate	Votes	%
Independent	Terry Norris (incumbent)	1,281	58.92%
Democratic	Ruth Shattuck Bernstein	725	33.35%
Independent	Richard Lenchus	157	7.22%
Write-in		11	0.51%
Total votes		2,174	100.00%
	Blank and spoiled	138	
