= Sally Achey =

American politician

Member of the Vermont House of Representatives from the Rutland-Bennington district
- In office January 6, 2021 – January 4, 2023
- Preceded by: Robin Chesnut-Tangerman
- Succeeded by: Robin Chesnut-Tangerman

Personal details
- Party: Democratic

Sally Achey is a former American politician from Vermont. Achey is a member of the Vermont Republican Party. She was a member of the 2021–2023 Vermont House of Representatives - defeating Robin Chesnut-Tangerman in the 2020 general election by a slim 32 votes. Achey, concerned about the fiscal cost of the VT Global Warming Solutions Act, ran against Chesnut-Tangerman again in 2022 and lost 962 to 855.
