= Wayne Laroche =

American politician

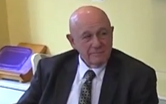
- Laroche in 2024

Member of the Vermont House of Representatives from the Franklin-5 district
- Incumbent
- Assumed office February 15, 2022
- Preceded by: Paul Martin

Personal details
- Born: Sheldon, Vermont, U. S.
- Party: Republican
- Education: University of Maine; California State Polytechnic University

Wayne Laroche is an American politician. He serves as a Republican member for the Franklin-5 district of the Vermont House of Representatives.

== Life and career ==
Laroche was born in Sheldon, Vermont. He attended Bellows Free Academy, graduating in 1968. Laroche also attended the University of Maine, where he earned his Bachelor of Science degree in 1972. He received a Master of Science from California State Polytechnic University in 1986.

Laroche was a marine biologist studying the developmental biology of marine fish at universities. In the 2000s, he was appointed by the 80th Governor of Vermont, Jim Douglas, to serve as the commissioner for the Vermont Department of Wildlife. He served for eight years.

In 2022, Laroche was appointed by Phil Scott to represent the Franklin-5 district of the Vermont House of Representatives following the resignation of Paul Martin.
