= Susan Buckholz =

American politician and member of the Vermont State House of Representatives

Member of the Vermont House of Representatives from the Windsor 4-1 district
- In office 2017–2019
- Succeeded by: Randall Szott

Personal details
- Party: Democratic
- Children: 1
- Education: Yale University (BA in History), Boston University School of Law

Susan Buckholz is an American politician who served in the Vermont House of Representatives from 2017 to 2019.
