= Jeff Shaver =

American baseball player (born 1963)

- Pitcher
- Born: July 30, 1963 (age 62); Beaver, Pennsylvania, U.S.
- Batted: Right Threw: Right

MLB debut
- July 6, 1988, for the Oakland Athletics

Last MLB appearance
- July 6, 1988, for the Oakland Athletics

MLB statistics
- Games: 1
- Innings pitched: 1.0
- Earned run average: 0.00
- Stats at Baseball Reference

Teams
- Oakland Athletics (1988)

Jeffrey Thomas Shaver (born July 30, 1963) is an American former professional baseball pitcher. He appeared in one game in Major League Baseball for the Oakland Athletics on July 6, 1988.

== Amateur career ==
Shaver attended Fredonia High School, where he played baseball, basketball and soccer. He went on to play college baseball at SUNY Fredonia. He was drafted by the A's in the 22nd round of the 1985 amateur draft. After being drafted, he was inducted into the school's Hall of Fame.

== Professional career ==
=== Minor leagues ===
Shaver began his professional career later that year with the minor league Medford A's, where he posted an 8–4 win–loss record, primarily as a starting pitcher. In 1986, Shaver was promoted to the Madison Muskies of the Midwest League, where he went 10–5. He advanced to Double-A in 1987, pitching for the Huntsville Stars of the Southern League. He advanced further up the minor league level in 1988, moving up to the Triple-A Tacoma Tigers.

=== Cup of coffee in The Show ===
During the 1988 season, the Oakland Athletics called Shaver up from the minor leagues. He made his major league debut on July 6, 1988, as Oakland was playing the Cleveland Indians. Todd Burns started the game for the Athletics, going five innings and allowing four earned runs. Rick Honeycutt relieved for two innings, allowing four more runs. In the eighth inning, Athletics' manager Tony La Russa brought in Shaver. Although he had only appeared in one game as a relief pitcher during his minor league career to this point, he fared well on this occasion, facing four batters without allowing a hit or a base on balls, although he did hit one batter. Oakland lost the game, 8-6.

=== Return to the minors ===
Shaver returned to Tacoma shortly thereafter, finishing his season there with a record of 7–10 and a 4.48 earned run average for the Tigers. He never got back to the major leagues, pitching in 1989 for Tacoma, and for Tacoma and Modesto in 1990 before retiring.
