= Joseph Andriano =

American politician from Vermont

Member of the Vermont House of Representatives from the Addison-Rutland district
- In office January 4, 2023 – January 8, 2025
- Preceded by: Terry Norris
- Succeeded by: Jim Casey

Personal details
- Party: Democratic

Joseph Andriano is an American politician from Vermont. He has been a Democratic member of the Vermont House of Representatives for the Addison-Rutland District since 2023.
