= Jonathan Williams (Vermont politician) =

American politician from Vermont

Member of the Vermont House of Representatives from the Washington-3 district
- Incumbent
- Assumed office January 4, 2023 Serving with Peter Anthony
- Preceded by: Tommy Walz

Personal details
- Born: 1984/1985 (age 41–42) New Jersey
- Party: Democratic
- Education: Boston University; University of Vermont

Jonathan Lisle Williams (born 1984/1985) is an American politician from Vermont. He has been a Democratic member of the Vermont House of Representatives for the Washington-3 district since 2023.

Raised in Hopewell, New Jersey, Williams graduated from Hopewell Valley Central High School, Williams graduated in 2007 from Boston University.
