= John Arrison =

American politician

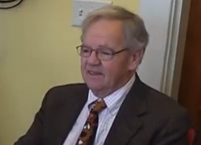
- Arrison in 2024

Member of the Vermont House of Representatives from the Windsor-2 district
- Incumbent
- Assumed office January 6, 2021
- Preceded by: Annmarie Christensen
- Succeeded by: VL Coffin

Personal details
- Born: 1950 or 1951 (age 74–75) Chester, Vermont, U. S.
- Party: Democratic
- Spouse: Patti Arrison
- Children: 1
- Education: University of Vermont

John Arrison (born 1950/1951) is an American politician. He serves as a Democratic member for the Windsor-2 district of the Vermont House of Representatives.

== Life and career ==
Arrison was born in Chester, Vermont and attended Chester High School. He also attended the University of Vermont, where he focused on electrical engineering.

Arrison owned the Watts Up Electric Inc company. He was an electrical contractor and master electrician. He was also a professor at Norwich University.

In 2021, Arrison was elected to represent the Windsor-2 district of the Vermont House of Representatives, succeeding Annmarie Christensen. He ran for the election and was in the ballot along with Stu Lindberg, an independent.
