= Catherine Beattie (politician) =

American politician

Member of the Vermont House of Representatives
- In office 1965–1966

Personal details
- Born: Catherine McDonald; April 5, 1921 Danville, Vermont, U.S.
- Died: September 24, 2014 (aged 93) Danville, Vermont, U.S.
- Party: Democratic
- Children: Jane Kitchel (daughter); Catherine Toll (daughter)

Catherine Beattie (née McDonald) (April 5, 1921 – September 24, 2014) was an American farmer and politician.

== Early life ==
Beattie was born in Danville, Vermont. She went to the Danville public schools and graduated from Danville High School in 1938.

== Career ==
Beattie served in the Vermont House of Representatives in 1965 and 1966 and was a Democrat.

== Personal life ==
Beattie married Harold Beattie and was the co-owner of the McDonald Farm. Her daughters Jane Kitchel and Catherine Toll also served in the Vermont General Assembly.

She died at her home at the McDonald Farm in Danville, Vermont.
