= Kimberly Jessup =

American politician

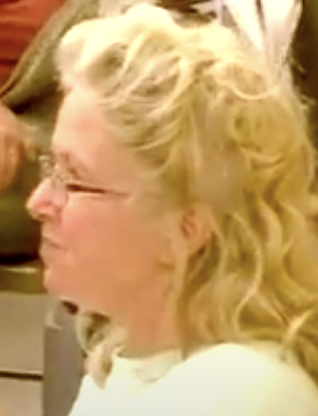
- Jessup in 2019

Member of the Vermont House of Representatives from the Washington 5 district
- In office January 2017 – January 2023
- Preceded by: Tony Klein
- Succeeded by: Ela Chapin

Personal details
- Born: Michigan, U.S.
- Party: Democratic
- Spouse: Ben Jessup
- Children: 2
- Education: University of California Berkeley (BA); Columbia University (MIA)

Kimberly Jessup is an American politician who served in the Vermont House of Representatives from 2017 to 2023.

A member of the Democratic Party, Jessup served on the House Committee on Appropriations, the House Ethics Panel, the Spousal Support and Maintenance Task Force, and the Judicial Nominating Board.

Jessup's legislative priorities include "[i]ssues around family financial security and environmental challenges."
