= Carl Rosenquist =

American politician

Member of the Vermont House of Representatives from the Franklin-1 district
- Incumbent
- Assumed office 2016

Personal details
- Born: March 5, 1943 (age 83) Abington Township, Montgomery County, Pennsylvania, U.S.
- Party: Republican
- Education: Temple University

Carl J. Rosenquist (born March 5, 1943) is an American politician in the state of Vermont. He is a member of the Vermont House of Representatives, sitting as a Republican from the Franklin-1 district, having been first elected in 2015.
