= Karen B. Kitzmiller =

American politician

Karen Ann Bittermann Kitzmiller

Member of the Vermont House of Representatives
- In office 1991 – May 20, 2001

Personal details
- Born: November 27, 1947 Champaign, Illinois, U.S.
- Died: May 20, 2001 (aged 53) Montpelier, Vermont, U.S.
- Party: Democratic
- Education: Johnson State College (BA)

Karen Ann Bittermann Kitzmiller (November 28, 1947 – May 20, 2001) was an American politician.

Kitzniller was born in Champaign, Illinois and went to public schools in Ohio, Florida, and Maryland. She graduated from Cornell University in 1969 with a bachelor's degree in home economics. Kitzmiller lived in Montpelier, Vermont with her husband Warren Kitzmiller. Kitzmiller was an artist, a social worker, and was the owner of a bed and breakfast house in Montpelier, Vermont. Kitzmiller served in the Vermont House of Representatives from 1991 until her death in 2001 from breast cancer, at her home, in Montpelier, Vermont. She was a Democrat. Warren Kitzmiller was then appointed to the Vermont General Assembly when his wife Karen Kitzmiller died.
