= Mike Yantachka =

American politician and member of the Vermont State House of Representatives

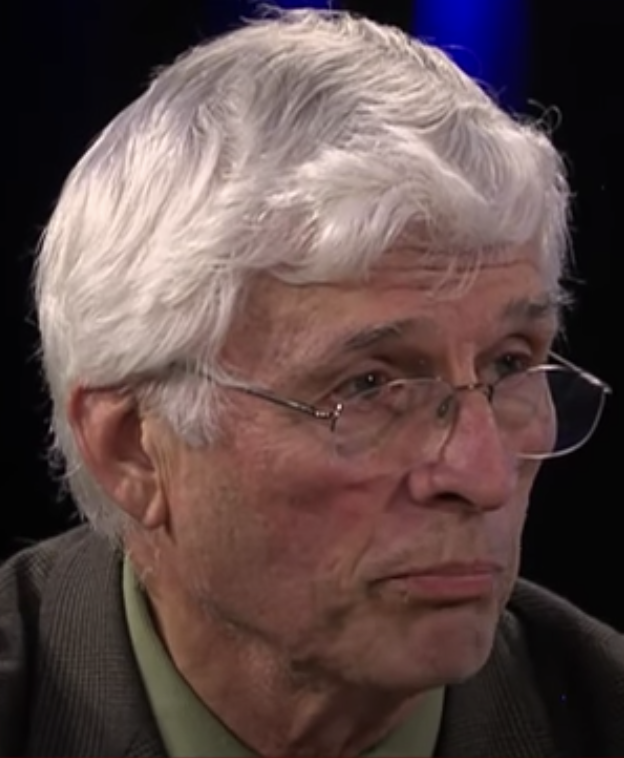
- Yantachka in 2018

Former member of the Vermont House of Representatives from the Chittenden 4-1 District
- In office 2011–2023

Personal details
- Born: Michael Yantachka Kingston, Pennsylvania, U.S.
- Citizenship: United States of America
- Party: Democratic
- Children: 5
- Education: King's College (BS, Mathematics) Rensselaer Polytechnic Institute (MS in Mathematics)
- Website: https://mikeyantachka.com

Mike Yantachka is an American politician who served in the Vermont House of Representatives from 2011 to 2023. He was defeated for renomination in 2022 by Chea Waters Evans after voting against a state constitutional amendment to protect abortion rights.
