= Lawrence Cupoli =

American politician and member of the Vermont State House of Representatives

Member of the Vermont House of Representatives from the Rutland 5-2 district
- Incumbent
- Assumed office 2012

Personal details
- Born: Rutland, Vermont
- Party: Republican
- Children: 3
- Education: Southern Vermont College

Lawrence Cupoli is an American politician who has served in the Vermont House of Representatives since 2014.
