= Thomas Bock (politician) =

American politician

Member of the Vermont House of Representatives from the Windsor-3-1 district
- Incumbent
- Assumed office 2017

Personal details
- Born: April 11, 1945 (age 81) Sauk Rapids, Minnesota, U.S.
- Party: Democratic
- Education: St. Cloud State University
- Profession: Executive, businessman

Thomas Alan Bock (born April 11, 1945) is an American politician in the state of Vermont. He is a member of the Vermont House of Representatives, sitting as a Democrat from the Windsor-3-1 district, having been first elected in 2016.
