= Maida Townsend =

American politician and member of the Vermont State House of Representatives

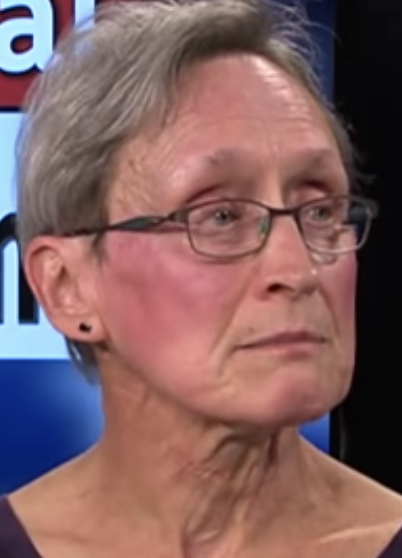
- Townsend in 2018

Member of the Vermont House of Representatives from the Chittenden 7-4 district
- In office January 9, 2013 – January 4, 2023
- Succeeded by: Kate Nugent (redistricting)

Personal details
- Party: Democratic
- Education: Skidmore College; University of Michigan; University of Vermont

Maida Townsend is an American politician who served in the Vermont House of Representatives from 2013 to 2023.
