= Catherine Toll =

American educator and politician

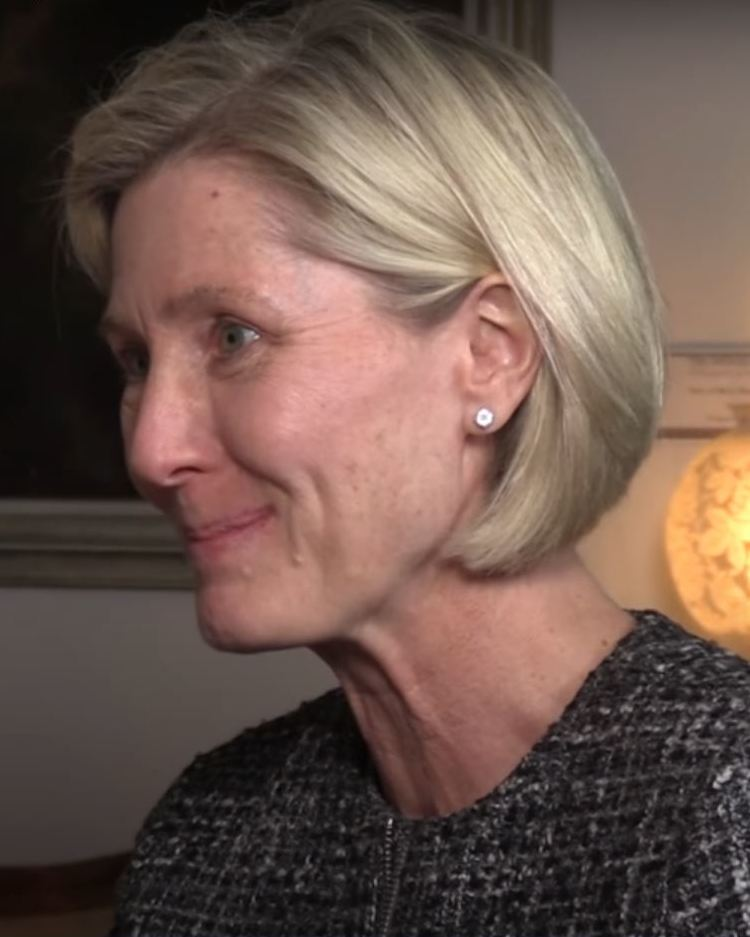

Member of the Vermont House of Representatives from the Caledonia-Washington-1 district
- In office 2009–2021
- Succeeded by: Henry Pearl

Personal details
- Born: Catherine Beattie; August 8, 1959 (age 66) Danville, Vermont, U.S.
- Party: Democratic
- Spouse: Abel Toll
- Relations: Catherine Beattie (mother); Jane Kitchel (sister)
- Children: 2
- Education: Lyndon State College (BS); University of Vermont (MEd)

Catherine "Kitty" Beattie Toll (born August 8, 1959) is an American educator and politician. A former member of the Vermont House of Representatives, Toll was a candidate for lieutenant governor of Vermont in the 2022 election, and lost the Democratic nomination to David Zuckerman.

== Early life and education ==
Toll was born in Danville, Vermont, to Catherine and Harold Beattie. Her sister is Jane Kitchel. Her mother and sister served in the Vermont General Assembly. She received a Bachelor of Science degree from Lyndon State College in 1981 and a Master of Education from University of Vermont.

== Career ==
Prior to entering politics, Toll taught in the Vermont public school system. She served as a member of the Vermont House of Representatives for the Caledonia-Washington district from 2009 to 2021. During her tenure in the House, Toll served as chair of the House Appropriations. She is a Democrat.

== Personal life ==
Toll is married to Abel Toll and lives in Danville, Vermont. She has two children.
