= Harvey Smith (American politician) =

American politician

Member of the Vermont House of Representatives from the Addison-5 district
- In office 2011–2019
- Succeeded by: Jubilee McGill

Personal details
- Born: June 2, 1945 (age 81) Nashua, New Hampshire, U.S.
- Party: Republican
- Education: University of New Hampshire

Harvey Smith (born June 2, 1945) is an American politician in the state of Vermont. He was a member of the Vermont House of Representatives, sitting as a Republican from the Addison-5 district, having been first elected in 2010. He also previously served from 1999 to 2006.
