= Curtis McCormack =

American politician (1952–2024)

Member of the Vermont House of Representatives from the Chittenden 6-3 district
- In office 2013–2022

Personal details
- Born: February 28, 1952 Queens, New York, U.S.
- Died: September 16, 2024 (aged 72)
- Party: Democratic
- Children: 2

Curtis McCormack (February 28, 1952 – September 16, 2024) was an American politician who served in the Vermont House of Representatives from 1983 to 1996 and from 2013 to 2022. He was born in Queens, and moved to Vermont in 1971. Richard McCormack, who has served in the Vermont Senate since 1989, is his older brother.

McCormack died of cancer on September 16, 2024, at the age of 72.
