= Tommy Walz =

American politician

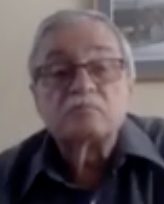

Member of the Vermont House of Representatives from the Washington-3 district
- In office 2015–2023
- Succeeded by: Jonathan Williams

Personal details
- Born: September 22, 1945 (age 81) Bangor, Maine, U.S.
- Party: Democratic
- Education: Bowdoin College
- Profession: teacher, educator

Tommy J. Walz (born September 22, 1945) is an American politician in the state of Vermont. He was a member of the Vermont House of Representatives, sitting as a Democrat from the Washington-3 district, having been first elected in 2014.
