= Peter Reed (politician) =

American politician from Vermont

Member of the Vermont House of Representatives from the Orange-Washington-Addison 7 district
- In office January 6, 2020 – January 6, 2021
- Preceded by: Ben Jickling
- Succeeded by: Larry Satcowitz

Personal details
- Born: St. Louis, Missouri
- Party: Independent

Peter Reed is an American politician from Vermont. He was an independent member of the Vermont House of Representatives for the Orange-Washington-Addison District from 2020 to 2021.

== Career ==
Reed previously worked as a banker and securities expert. Governor Phil Scott has appointed Peter Reed to replace Ben Jickling in the Vermont House of Representatives.
