= Richard J. Howrigan =

American politician (1933–2025)

Member of the Vermont House of Representatives
- In office 1993–1994

Member of the Vermont House of Representatives from the Franklin-4 district
- In office 1994–2002

Member of the Vermont House of Representatives from the Franklin-2 district
- In office 2002–2012

Personal details
- Born: Richard James Howrigan; February 14, 1933 Colchester, Vermont, U.S.
- Died: January 18, 2025 (aged 91) Colchester, Vermont, U.S.
- Party: Democratic
- Education: Saint Michael's College

Richard James Howrigan (February 14, 1933 – January 18, 2025) was an American politician. A member of the Democratic Party, he served in the Vermont House of Representatives from 1993 to 2012.

== Life and career ==
Howrigan was born in Colchester, Vermont, the son of Edward James Howrigan and Helen Alice Maloney. He attended St. Mary's High School, graduating in 1947. After graduating, he attended Saint Michael's College, earning his B.A. degree in 1956. After earning his degree, he served as a volunteer in the United States Peace Corps in Ethiopia from 1962 to 1964.

Howrigan served in the Vermont House of Representatives from 1993 to 2012.

== Death ==
Howrigan died at his son's home in Colchester, Vermont, on January 18, 2025, at the age of 91.
