= John Gannon (Vermont politician) =

American politician

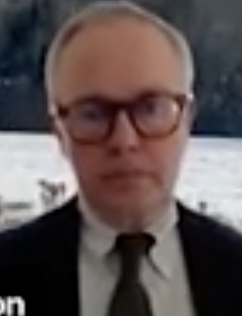

Member of the Vermont House of Representatives from the Windham 6 district
- Incumbent
- Assumed office 2017

Personal details
- Born: Wilmington, Vermont, U.S.
- Party: Democratic
- Children: 2
- Education: Middlebury College (BA); Suffolk University Law School (JD)

John Gannon is an American politician who has served in the Vermont House of Representatives since 2017.
