= Mark Huntley =

American politician (1956–2025)

Mark Allen Huntley (June 4, 1956 – February 3, 2025) was an American politician.

== Background ==
Huntley was born on June 4, 1956, and attended Rutland High School. He worked as a financial planner, managing Huntley Financial Services in Ludlow for over two decades, and was a percussionist as well. Huntley was married to Sharon Beaupre from 1991 until their divorce in 2013. He died on February 3, 2025, at the age of 68.

== Political career ==
Huntley was a Democratic member of the Cavendish Board of Selectmen from 2006 until 2012. In 2011, Huntley was elected to a three-year term as lister in Windsor County. The following year, he won the Windsor-2 seat in the Vermont House of Representatives against fellow Cavendish selectman Scott Ranney. Huntley was reelected in 2014, defeating independent candidate Stuart Lindberg.
