= Patrick Seymour (politician) =

American politician

Member of the Vermont House of Representatives from the Caledonia-4 district
- In office January 2019 – February 24, 2022 Serving with Martha Feltus
- Preceded by: Richard Lawrence
- Succeeded by: John Kascenska

Caledonia County Justice of the Peace from the town of Sutton
- In office January 2017 – January 2023

Member of the Sutton School Board
- In office 2015–2018

Personal details
- Born: March 25, 1997 (age 29) St. Johnsbury, Vermont
- Party: Independent (until 2018, 2022-present); Republican (2018-2022); Democratic (2016)
- Spouse: Ashley Miles (m. 2020)
- Education: Northern Vermont University - Lyndon (Associates in Business)

Patrick Seymour is an American politician from Vermont who most recently served in the Vermont House of Representatives from Caledonia district 4 alongside Martha Feltus. He was first elected to the legislature in 2018, becoming the youngest member of the chamber, after previously running in 2016 as the Democratic nominee.

Seymour positions himself as a classically liberal Republican as was common in New England in the 19th and 20th centuries, similar to such Vermont figures as George Aiken, Winston L. Prouty, and Jim Jeffords. He aligns with policies of both libertarians such as Ron Paul and progressives such as Bernie Sanders. Seymour did not support Republican presidential nominee Donald Trump in the 2016 nor 2020 elections.

Seymour was first elected as a County Justice of the Peace from the town of Sutton in 2016. He also formerly served as a member of the Caledonia County Republican Committee, the Sutton volunteer fire department, and on the Sutton school board. Seymour is also a dairy farmer in the town of Sutton.

Seymour left the Democratic Party in 2016 and became Independent; later when running for the Vermont House in 2018, retiring Republican incumbent Richard Lawrence endorsed Seymour, who later ran in and won the Republican primary, and went on to run and win as a Republican candidate in the general election.

Seymour won re-election as both State Representative and County Justice in the 2020 Vermont elections.

Seymour resigned from the Vermont House of Representatives on February 24, 2022, citing work and family changes as his reason for resignation.

Vermont House of Representatives
Preceded by Richard Lawrence	Vermont Representative from the Caledonia-4 District; 2019–2022; Served alongside: Martha Feltus	Succeeded by John Kascenska
