= Joshua Aldrich =

American businessman and firefighter

Member-elect of the Vermont House of Representatives from the Franklin-5 district
- Did not assume office
- Preceded by: Stephen Beyor
- Succeeded by: Lisa Hango

Personal details
- Born: Joshua C. Aldrich
- Party: Democratic; Republican
- Occupation: Businessman, firefighter

Joshua C. Aldrich is an American businessman and firefighter. A member of the Democratic Party and the Republican Party, he was elected to the Vermont House of Representatives in 2018, but did not assume office due to family reasons.
