= Valerie Stuart =

American politician and member of the Vermont State House of Representatives

Member of the Vermont House of Representatives from the Windham 2-1 district
- Incumbent
- Assumed office January 9, 2019

Personal details
- Born: Smyrna, Tennessee, U.S.
- Party: Democratic
- Education: New York State University College (BA)

Valerie Stuart is an American politician who served in the Vermont House of Representatives from 2011 to 2019.
