= Laura Sibilia =

American politician

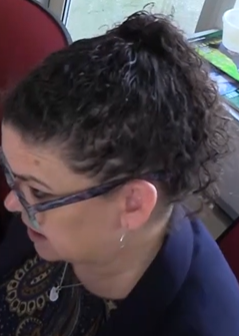

Member of the Vermont House of Representatives from the Windham-Bennington district
- Incumbent
- Assumed office January 7, 2015
- Preceded by: John Moran

Personal details
- Party: Independent
- Spouse: TJ
- Children: 3
- Education: Champlain College (BA); Massachusetts College of Liberal Arts

Laura Sibilia is an American politician who serves as a member of the Vermont House of Representatives from the Windham-Bennington district as an independent.

== Early life and education ==
Sibilia is the eldest of twelve children. She graduated from Whitingham High School, Champlain College with a degree in hotel restaurant management, and studied English and communications at Massachusetts College of Liberal Arts. Sibilia married TJ, with whom she had three children. She was first elected to the Dover School board in 2003, and also served on the River Valleys School District board.

== Vermont House of Representatives ==
Sibilia defeated Representative John Moran, a Democratic member of the Vermont House of Representatives, and independent candidate Phil Gilpin in the 2014 election as an independent. She defeated Moran in the 2016 election, faced no opposition in the 2018 election, and defeated Republican nominee Matthew Somerville in the 2020 election.

She serves on the Ethics Panel, as vice-chair of the Energy and Technology committee, and as chair of the Joint Information Technology Oversight committee. Sibilia served on Governor Phil Scott's transition team in 2016.

== Political positions ==
Sibilia sponsored legislation to implement ranked voting in 2019, stating that it "guarantees the will of the majority and encourages more people to step into politics". She initially voted against the legalization of marijuana, but later voted in favor of it due to a commission which she felt would help prepare for marijuana sales in Massachusetts. The Vermont Conservation Voters gave her a lifetime score of 63%.

== Electoral history ==
2014 Vermont House of Representatives Windham-Bennington district election
Party	Candidate	Votes	%
Independent	Laura Sibilia	577	45.29%
Democratic	John Moran (incumbent)	538	42.23%
Independent	Philip Gilpin	159	12.48%
Total votes		1,274	100.00%
	Blank and spoiled	8	

2016 Vermont House of Representatives Windham-Bennington district election
Party	Candidate	Votes	%
Independent	Laura Sibilia (incumbent)	1,152	56.20%
Democratic	John Moran	897	43.76%
Write-in		1	0.05%
Total votes		2,050	100.00%
	Blank and spoiled	105	

2018 Vermont House of Representatives Windham-Bennington district election
Party	Candidate	Votes	%
Independent	Laura Sibilia (incumbent)	1,377	96.16%
Write-in		55	3.84%
Total votes		1,432	100.00%
	Blank and spoiled	318	

2020 Vermont House of Representatives Windham-Bennington district election
Party	Candidate	Votes	%
Independent	Laura Sibilia (incumbent)	1,520	63.39%
Republican	Matthew Somerville	867	36.16%
Write-in		11	0.46%
Total votes		2,398	100.00%
	Blank and spoiled	151	

2022 Vermont House of Representatives Windham-2 district election
Party	Candidate	Votes	%
Independent	Laura Sibilia (incumbent)	1,068	70.03%
Independent	George Wilson	454	29.77%
Write-in		3	0.20%
Total votes		1,525	100.00%
	Blank and spoiled	126	

2024 Vermont House of Representatives Windham-2 district election
Party	Candidate	Votes	%
Independent	Laura Sibilia (incumbent)	1,580	93.22%
Write-in		115	6.78%
Total votes		1,695	100.00%
	Blank and spoiled	501	
