= Alyson Eastman =

American politician

Alyson Eastman (born January 1, 1977) is an American politician. She served as member of the Vermont House of Representatives, representing the Addison-Rutland District from 2015 to 2017 as an independent.

== See also ==
- Politics of Vermont
