= Barbara Murphy (politician) =

American politician

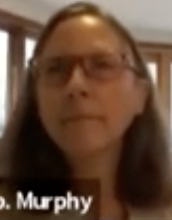

Member of the Vermont House of Representatives from the Franklin 2 district
- In office 2015–2023
- Preceded by: John I. Mitchell
- Succeeded by: Eileen Dickinson

Personal details
- Born: 1957 (age 68–69) Burlington, Vermont, U.S.
- Party: Independent
- Spouse: Michael James Murphy
- Children: 2
- Education: University of Vermont (BA)

Barbara Smith Murphy (born 1957) is an American politician who served as a member of the Vermont House of Representatives from the Franklin 2 district as an independent.

== Early life and education ==
Barbara Smith Murphy was born in Burlington, Vermont, in 1957, to Levi and Sybil Smith. She graduated from Burlington High School in 1975, and from the University of Vermont with a Bachelor of Arts in 1980. She married Michael James Murphy, with whom she had two children before his death in 2003, on June 21, 1980, and moved to Fairfax, Vermont.

== Career ==
Murphy served as a justice of the peace from 1998 to 1999, and on the board of selectmen from 2004 to 2005. She was appointed to the Aviation Advisory Council by Governor Phil Scott. She was elected to the Vermont House of Representatives from the Franklin district as an independent candidate in the 2014 election after defeating Republican nominee Chris Santee and independent candidate Bob Shea. She was reelected in the 2016 and 2018 election against Republican nominee Mary Beerworth. Murphy won without opposition in the 2020 election.

== Electoral history ==
2014 Vermont House of Representatives Franklin 2 district election
Party	Candidate	Votes	%
Independent	Barbara Murphy	586	45.60%
Republican	Chris Santee	571	44.44%
Independent	Bob Shea	228	17.74%
Total votes		1,285	100.00%
	Blank and spoiled	34	

2016 Vermont House of Representatives Franklin 2 district election
Party	Candidate	Votes	%
Independent	Barbara Murphy (incumbent)	1,194	51.18%
Republican	Mary Beerworth	1,136	48.69%
Write-in		3	0.13%
Total votes		2,333	100.00%
	Blank and spoiled	98	

2018 Vermont House of Representatives Franklin 2 district election
Party	Candidate	Votes	%
Independent	Barbara Murphy (incumbent)	1,079	52.81%
Republican	Mary Beerworth	961	47.04%
Write-in		3	0.15%
Total votes		2,333	100.00%
	Blank and spoiled	50	

2020 Vermont House of Representatives Franklin 2 district election
Party	Candidate	Votes	%
Independent	Barbara Murphy (incumbent)	2,484	97.91%
Write-in		53	2.09%
Total votes		2,537	100.00%
	Blank and spoiled	486	
