= Randall Szott =

American politician

Member of the Vermont House of Representatives
- In office 2019–2021
- Preceded by: Susan Buckholz
- Succeeded by: Heather Surprenant
- Constituency: Windsor 4-1

Personal details
- Born: December 1971 (age 54) Space Coast, Florida, U.S.
- Party: Democratic

Randall Szott is an American artist and politician who served in the Vermont House of Representatives from 2019 until 2021.

== Biography ==
Szott was born in December 1971 in the Space Coast of Florida. He received a bachelor of arts degree in liberal arts from the University of Central Florida, a master of fine arts degree in critical practice from Ohio State University, and a master of arts degree in interdisciplinary art from San Francisco State University.

Szott has delivered lectures about social practice at the San Francisco Museum of Modern Art and the California College of the Arts. In 2018, he was an invited guest of the Harvard Graduate School of Education for a Radcliffe Institute for Advanced Study workshop. He was a founding editor of 127 Prince, the first journal devoted to social practice.

At some point, Szott was a member of the United States Merchant Marine and also worked as a chef. He is now a public librarian in Weston, Vermont.

A member of the Democratic Party, Szott was elected to the Vermont House of Representatives in 2018, representing the Windsor 4-1 district, which contains the towns of West Hartford, Barnard, Pomfret, and most of Quechee. Szott was elected unopposed. Szott did not run for re-election in 2020.
