= Robin Chesnut-Tangerman =

Vermont Progressive politician

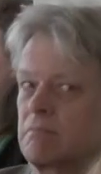
- Chesnut-Tangerman in 2024

Member of the Vermont House of Representatives from the Rutland-Bennington district
- In office January 4, 2014 – January 6, 2021
- Preceded by: John Malcolm
- Succeeded by: Sally Achey
- Incumbent
- Assumed office January 6, 2023

Personal details
- Party: Progressive
- Education: BA, Hamilton College; Woodbury College

Robin Chesnut-Tangerman is a Vermont politician who is the Progressive Caucus Leader of the Vermont House of Representatives, representing the Rutland-Bennington district. He is the owner-operator of Talisman Woodwork. He is also an environmental columnist for the Rutland Herald, writing a column called Weekly Planet, and participates in community theater. Though a member of the Vermont Progressive Party, he ran as a Democrat and defeated Sally Achey in the 2022 Vermont House of Representatives election.
