= Lisa Hango =

American politician from Vermont

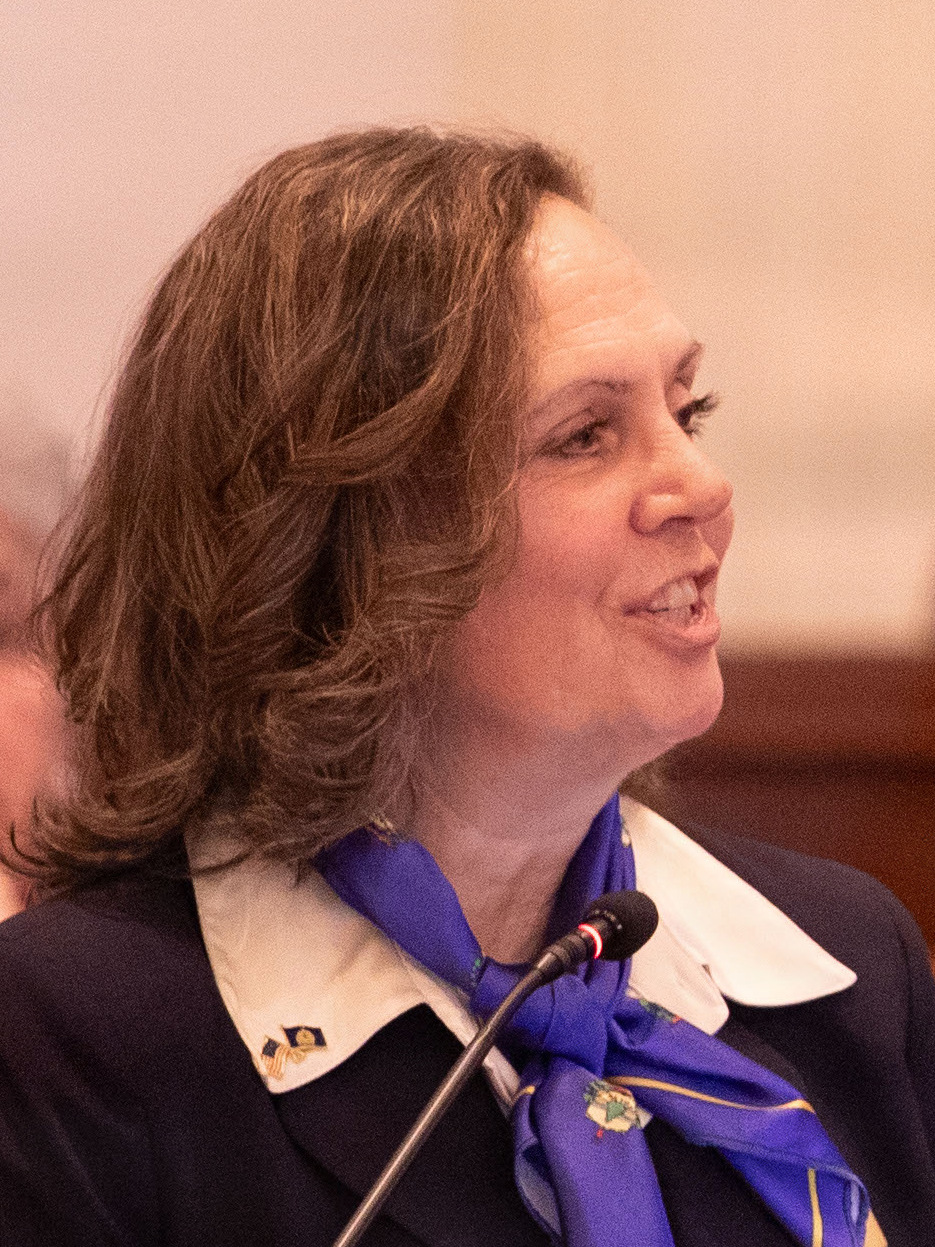
- Hango in 2026

Member of the Vermont House of Representatives from the Franklin-5 District district
- Incumbent
- Assumed office February 14, 2019
- Preceded by: Stephen Beyor; Joshua Aldrich (elect)

Personal details
- Party: Republican

Lisa Hango is an American politician from Vermont. She has been a Republican member of the Vermont House of Representatives for the Franklin-5 District since her appointment by Governor Phil Scott in 2019.
