= Kelly Pajala =

American politician (born 1978)

Member of the Vermont House of Representatives from the Windham-Bennington-Windsor district
- In office 2017 – July 25, 2024
- Preceded by: Oliver Olsen
- Succeeded by: Christopher Morrow

Personal details
- Born: Kelly MacLaury Pajala; December 15, 1978 (age 47) Pennington, New Jersey, U.S.
- Party: Independent
- Children: 2
- Education: Skidmore College (BA)

Kelly MacLaury Pajala (born December 15, 1978) is an American politician who served as a member of the Vermont House of Representatives from the Windham-Bennington-Windsor district as an independent.

== Early life and education ==
Kelly MacLaury Pajala was born in Pennington, New Jersey, on December 15, 1978, and her family moved to Vermont when she was eleven. She graduated from the Burr and Burton Academy and Skidmore College with a Bachelor of Arts in women's studies. Pajala served as the assistant town clerk in Weston and town clerk in Londonderry, Vermont.

== Vermont House of Representatives ==
In 2017, Oliver Olsen, an independent member of the Vermont House of Representatives, resigned to focus on his business career. Governor Phil Scott appointed Pajala as she was also an independent. She won in the 2018 and 2020 elections without opposition. She serves on the Human Services committee.

Pajala resigned in July 2024 in order to take a position with FEMA.

== Electoral history ==
2018 Vermont House of Representatives Windham-Bennington-Windsor district election
Party	Candidate	Votes	%
Independent	Kelly Pajala (incumbent)	1,852	98.62%
Write-in		26	1.38%
Total votes		1,878	100.00%
	Blank and spoiled	273	

2020 Vermont House of Representatives Windham-Bennington-Windsor district election
Party	Candidate	Votes	%
Independent	Kelly Pajala (incumbent)	2,539	99.69%
Write-in		8	0.31%
Total votes		2,547	100.00%
	Blank and spoiled	499	
