= Woodman Page =

American politician

Woodman (Woody) Page is an American politician. Born in Newport, Vermont, he attended North Country Union High School, later attending Norwich University and Lesley University. He served in the United States Air Force for 28 years, returning to Newport in 2010. He represents the Orleans-2 district in the Vermont House of Representatives as a Republican, and was elected for the 2023–2024 session.
