= Peter Anthony (Vermont politician) =

American politician from Vermont

Member of the Vermont House of Representatives from the Washington-3 District district
- Incumbent
- Assumed office January 9, 2019 Serving with Jonathan Williams

Personal details
- Born: Hell's Kitchen, Manhattan, New York City, USA
- Party: Democratic
- Occupation: former mayor of Barre City

Peter Anthony is an American politician from Vermont. He has been a Democratic member of the Vermont House of Representatives for the Washington-3 District since 2019.
