= Ben Jickling =

American politician and member of the Vermont State House of Representatives

Member of the Vermont House of Representatives from the Orange-Washington-Addison district
- In office 2017–2019
- Succeeded by: Peter Reed

Personal details
- Party: Independent
- Education: Trinity College

Ben Jickling is an American politician who served in the Vermont House of Representatives from 2017 to 2019.
