= Zachariah Ralph =

American politician and member of the Vermont State House of Representatives

Zachariah (Ralph) Watson

Member of the Vermont House of Representatives from the Windsor-1 District
- In office 2019–2021

Personal details
- Born: Woodstock, Vermont, U.S.
- Party: Vermont Progressive
- Education: Loyola College (BA)

Zachariah Ralph is an American politician who served in the Vermont House of Representatives from 2019 to 2021.
