= Paul Martin (Vermont politician) =

American politician

Member of the Vermont House of Representatives from the Franklin-5 district
- In office January 6, 2021 – February 10, 2022
- Preceded by: Charen Fegard
- Succeeded by: Wayne Laroche

Personal details
- Party: Republican

Paul Martin is an American politician. He served as a Republican member for the Franklin-5 district of the Vermont House of Representatives.

== Life and career ==
Martin is a real estate agent.

In 2021, Martin was elected to the Franklin-5 district of the Vermont House of Representatives, succeeding Charen Fegard. He earned 30.7 percentage of the votes.

In 2022, citing a "lack of time", Martin resigned and was succeeded by Wayne Laroche.
