= John Palasik =

American politician (1954–2022)

Member of the Vermont House of Representatives from the Chittenden-10 district
- In office 2019–2022 Serving with Chris Mattos
- Preceded by: Donald H. Turner
- Succeeded by: Chris Taylor

Personal details
- Born: February 5, 1954 Schenectady, New York, U.S.
- Died: November 15, 2022 (aged 68) Colchester, Vermont, U.S.
- Party: Republican

John Eugene Palasik (February 5, 1954 – November 15, 2022) was an American Republican politician who represented the Chittenden-10 district in the Vermont House of Representatives from 2019 until his death in 2022. He announced his retirement from the house before the 2022 Vermont House of Representatives election.

== Background ==
Palasik was born in Schenectady, New York and served in the United States Army with the military police. He then served with the Franklin County, Vermont sheriff and in the Vermont National Guard. Palasik lived in Milton, Vermont with his wife and family. He served with the Milton Police Department as a sergeant until his retirement in 2015. He served on the Milton Selectboard, from 2016 to 2022, and as the Milton justice of the peace.

== Death ==
Palasik died after several months of illness on November 15, 2022, at the age of 68.
