= Vicki Strong =

American politician

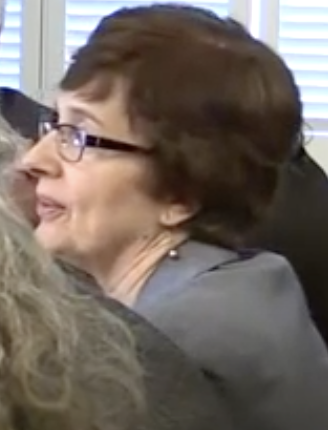
- Strong in 2020

Member of the Vermont House of Representatives from the Orleans-Caledonia 1 district
- In office January 5, 2011 – January 4, 2023
- Preceded by: John S. Rodgers
- Succeeded by: Katherine Sims

Personal details
- Born: February 15, 1957 (age 69) Auburn, New York, U.S.
- Party: Republican

Vicki Strong (born February 15, 1957) is an American politician who served in the Vermont House of Representatives from the Orleans-Caledonia 1 district from 2011 to 2023.
