= John Killacky =

American politician (1951/1952–2026

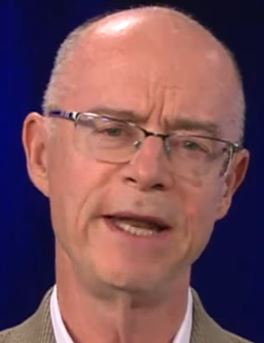

Member of the Vermont House of Representatives from the Chittenden-7-3 district
- In office 2019–2022

Personal details
- Born: 1952
- Died: November 2, 2026 (aged 74) South Burlington, Vermont, U.S.
- Other political affiliations: Democratic
- Spouse: Lawrence Connolly

John R. Killacky (1952 – November 2, 2026) was an American politician, arts administrator and artist. He was elected to the Vermont House of Representatives in 2019 and served two terms. Before his retirement in 2018, Killacky was the head of the Flynn Center for the Performing Arts in Burlington, Vermont. Killacky also was an arts program officer with the San Francisco Foundation.

Killacky wrote numerous publications on the arts and wrote and directed several award-winning short films and videos. His videos have been screened in festivals, galleries, museums, hospitals, and universities world-wide and are in the collections of numerous libraries and universities. His work has been televised locally in Texas, Minnesota, Maine, and Vermont, and nationally on Free Speech TV, PBS, and Cultura24 in Holland.

He curated a retrospective photography exhibition, Dona Ann McAdams: Performative Acts, that toured to five venues in Vermont (2019–2021). Champlain College Art Gallery hosted a retrospective of eight of his videos, Embodied Voice (2018) and he was artist-in-residence there co-curating FluxFest (2023). At Fabric Workshop and Museum (2024), he worked onsite with production staff on his intermedia installation, stillpoint. Other recent installations of his work were on view at Burlington City Arts, The Art Museum of West Virginia University, and Leicester Gallery at De Montfort University in 2026.

Killacky died from prostate cancer at his home in South Burlington, Vermont, on November 2, 2026, at the age of 74.

== Books ==
- Queer Crips: Disabled Gay Men and Their Stories
- because art: Commentary, Critique, & Conversation (Onion River Press, 2021)
