= Francis McFaun =

American politician

Member of the Vermont House of Representatives
- In office January 4, 2023 – April 3, 2026
- Succeeded by: David Soucy

Personal details
- Born: 1939 (age 86–87) Cambridge, Massachusetts, U.S.
- Party: Republican

Francis Matthew "Topper" McFaun (born 1939) is a Republican politician who served in the Vermont House of Representatives. He represented the Washington-Orange district from 2023 through 2026. He resigned in April 2026 in order to spend more time with his family.
