= Leslie Goldman =

American politician and member of the Vermont State House of Representatives

Member of the Vermont House of Representatives from the Windham 3 district
- Incumbent
- Assumed office 2021

Personal details
- Party: Democratic

Leslie Goldman is an American politician who has served in the Vermont House of Representatives since 2021.
