= Paul Lefebvre (American politician) =

American politician

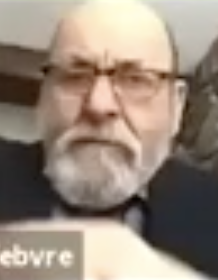

Member of the Vermont House of Representatives from the Essex-Caladonia-Orleans district
- In office 2015–2023
- Preceded by: Bill Johnson

Personal details
- Born: January 26, 1945 (age 81) Newport, Vermont, U.S.
- Party: Republican (before 2020); Independent (after 2020)
- Education: Springfield College (BA); Arizona State University (MA)

Paul D. Lefebvre (born January 26, 1945) is an American journalist and politician who served as a member of the Vermont House of Representatives from the Essex-Caladonia-Orleans district from 2015 to 2023. He began his service as a Republican but left the party to become an independent ahead of the 2020 election, citing "polarizing times".

== Early life and education ==
Paul D. Lefebvre was born in Newport, Vermont, on January 26, 1945, to Theodore Lefebvre. During his education at Brighton High School before his graduation in 1962, he served on the student council, as class president in the 10th and 12th grades, and as a delegate to Boys/Girls State in 1962. He graduated from Springfield College, during which he studied abroad in Europe, with a Bachelor of Arts degree in 1967, and from Arizona State University with a master's degree in European history. He has worked for The Chronicle since 1978.

== Vermont House of Representatives ==
Bill Johnson, a member of the Vermont House of Representatives for seventeen years, retired during the 2014 election. Lefebvre ran for the Republican nomination after Johnson announcement as he believed that Johnson was "unbeatable as he was highly respected in all the towns he served". He defeated Kenn Stransky and Maurice G. Connary in the Republican primary and faced no opposition in the 2014 and 2016 elections. He defeated Democratic nominee Martha W. Allen in the 2018 election. He ran for reelection in the 2020 election as an independent candidate stating that he would "rather be an independent with Republican leanings" due to the "polarizing times" and defeated Allen.

He serves on the Joint Energy committee, and as vice-chair of the Natural Resources, Fish, and Wildlife committee. Lefebvre endorsed Phil Scott during the 2018 gubernatorial election and Scott Milne during the 2020 lieutenant gubernatorial election. He voted in favor of legislation to increase the minimum wage in 2020, but later voted to sustain Scott's veto of the legislation.

== Electoral history ==
2014 Vermont House of Representatives Essex-Caladonia-Orleans district Republican primary
Party	Candidate	Votes	%
Republican	Paul Lefebvre	271	62.01%
Republican	Kenn Stransky	124	28.38%
Republican	Maurice G. Connary	42	9.61%
Total votes		437	100.00%
	Blank and spoiled	22	

2014 Vermont House of Representatives Essex-Caladonia-Orleans district election
Party	Candidate	Votes	%
Republican	Paul Lefebvre	927	96.26%
Write-in		36	3.74%
Total votes		963	100.00%
	Blank and spoiled	155	

2016 Vermont House of Representatives Essex-Caladonia-Orleans district Republican primary
Party	Candidate	Votes	%
Republican	Paul Lefebvre (incumbent)	289	98.30%
Write-in		5	1.70%
Total votes		294	100.00%
	Blank and spoiled	72	

2016 Vermont House of Representatives Essex-Caladonia-Orleans district election
Party	Candidate	Votes	%
Republican	Paul Lefebvre (incumbent)	1,590	98.03%
Write-in		32	1.97%
Total votes		1,622	100.00%
	Blank and spoiled	309	

2018 Vermont House of Representatives Essex-Caladonia-Orleans district Republican primary
Party	Candidate	Votes	%
Republican	Paul Lefebvre (incumbent)	239	95.60%
Write-in		11	4.40%
Total votes		250	100.00%
	Blank and spoiled	77	

2018 Vermont House of Representatives Essex-Caladonia-Orleans district election
Party	Candidate	Votes	%
Republican	Paul Lefebvre (incumbent)	827	55.39%
Democratic	Martha W. Allen	664	44.47%
Write-in		2	0.13%
Total votes		1,493	100.00%
	Blank and spoiled	38	

2020 Vermont House of Representatives Essex-Caladonia-Orleans district election
Party	Candidate	Votes	%
Independent	Paul Lefebvre (incumbent)	1,067	52.43%
Democratic	Martha W. Allen	958	47.08%
Write-in		10	0.49%
Total votes		2,035	100.00%
	Blank and spoiled	108	
