= Robert Bancroft =

American politician and member of the Vermont State House of Representatives

Member of the Vermont House of Representatives from the Chittenden 8-3 district
- Incumbent
- Assumed office 2014

Personal details
- Born: Barre, Vermont, U.S.
- Party: Republican
- Children: 3
- Education: University of Vermont (BA, MS); Purdue University (PhD)

Robert L. Bancroft is an American politician who has served in the Vermont House of Representatives since 2014.

== Early life and education ==
Bancroft was born in Barre, Vermont. He earned a Bachelor of Arts degree in economics and a Master of Science in agricultural economics from the University of Vermont, followed by a PhD in agricultural economics from Purdue University.

== Career ==
From 1981 to 1991, Bancroft was an assistant professor in the University of Vermont Department of Agricultural and Resource Economics. Since 1991, he has worked as an independent economic consultant. He also served as a member of the Westford Selectboard and Westford School Board. Bancroft served as a member of the Vermont House of Representatives from 2014 to 2021.
