= Warren Kitzmiller =

American politician (1943–2022)

Member of the Vermont House of Representatives from the Washington-4 district
- In office 2001 – July 10, 2022

Personal details
- Born: March 21, 1943; Erie, Pennsylvania, U.S.
- Died: July 10, 2022 (aged 79); Montpelier, Vermont, U.S.
- Political party: Democratic
- Spouses: Karen B. Kitzmiller; Jeanne Cariati

Warren Frederick Kitzmiller (March 21, 1943 – July 10, 2022) was an American politician who was a member of the Vermont House of Representatives from 2001 to 2022 and was a Democrat. He was appointed to the Vermont General Assembly in 2001, when his wife Karen B. Kitzmiller who served in the Vermont General Assembly, died from cancer. He owned a sports store in Montpelier and served on the Montpelier City Council.

Kitzmiller died following a stroke on July 10, 2022, at the age of 79.
