= Bixby Memorial Free Library =

Public library in Vergennes, Vermont, US

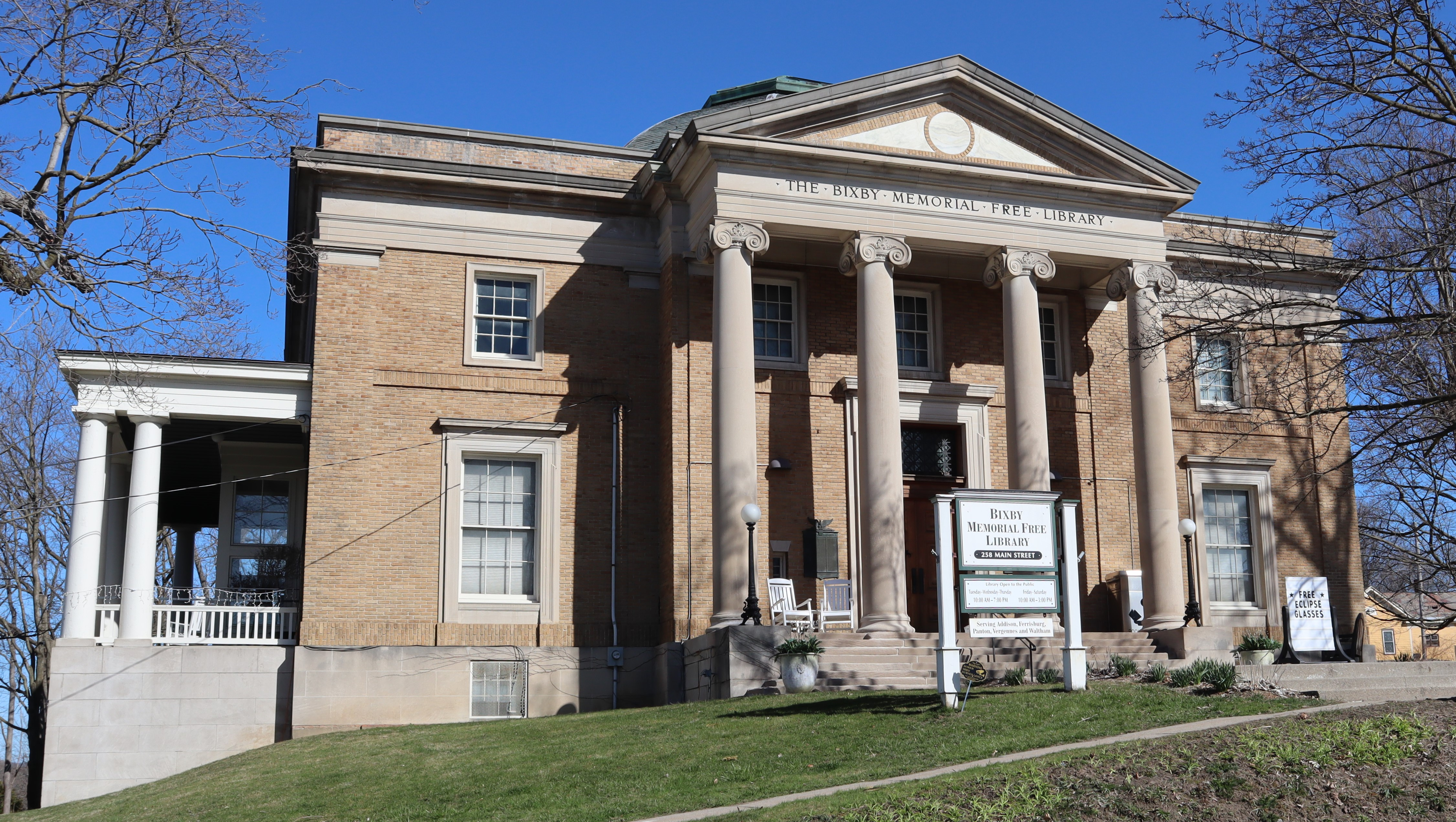
- Location: 258 Main St, Vergennes, Vermont, United States of America
- Type: Public Library
- Established: November 4, 1912

Other information
- Website: bixbylibrary.org

Bixby Memorial Free Library is a public library located in Vergennes, Vermont. The library serves five Vermont communities: Addison, Ferrisburgh, Panton, Vergennes, and Waltham.

== History ==
The library is a memorial to local business owner William Gove Bixby, who bequeathed the funds to build it. Frederick G. Frost was the architect.

The cornerstone was laid in September 1911. On August 1, 1912, the 3,530 volumes plus public documents, government reports and unbound magazines of the City Library were transferred to the newly opened Bixby Library and dedication ceremonies were held on October 1, 1912. At the dedication, President John M. Thomas of Middlebury College said:

“The free public library is one of our great modern democratic institutions. It is supported by all for the uplift of all…This library should be a working tool for this community, entering into every part of its life, industrial, educational, civic and religious.”

On November 4, 1912, Bixby Library was first opened for the circulation of books, and every day until November 12, students and their teachers from the elementary and secondary schools visited to sign up for library cards and check out books—a total of 239 students. In addition to providing materials for circulation and places for quiet reading or study, the library was a community center. During World War I, the basement rooms were used by the Red Cross and, thereafter, were available to local residents for rest and relaxation from 9:00 a.m. to 9:00 p.m. daily. By the tenth anniversary celebration on October 5, 1922, an annual circulation exceeding 30,000 was reported, a figure that increased to 39,903 in 1931.

== Services ==
The Bixby Library's holdings includes books, large print books, audiobooks, DVDs, eBooks, and periodicals. The library provides free WiFi access, public computers, and printing services.
