= Stephen Bates (sheriff) =

American sheriff (1842–1907)

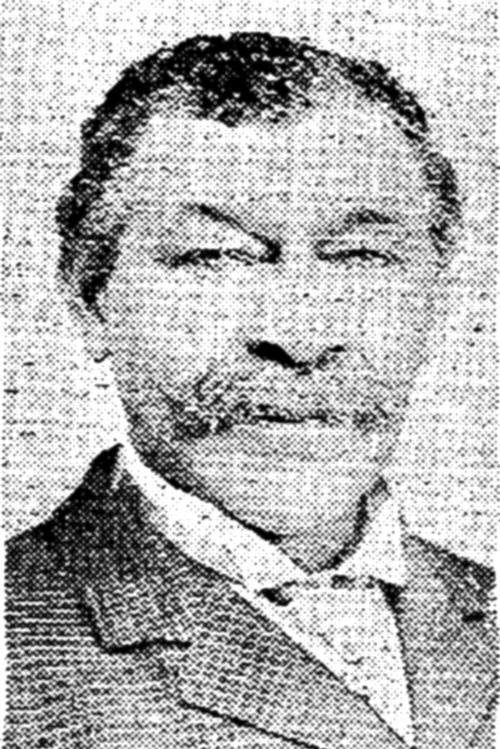
- Stephen Bates in 1905

Sheriff of Vergennes, Vermont
- In office 1879–1905
- In office 1907

Personal details
- Born: 1842 Shirley, Virginia, US
- Died: June 10, 1907 (aged 64–65) Vergennes, Vermont, US
- Party: Republican
- Occupation: Sheriff

Stephen Bates (1842 – June 10, 1907) was an American law enforcement officer who served as sheriff and Police Chief of the city of Vergennes, Vermont, for 25 years between 1879 and 1907. He was the first Black chief law enforcement officer in Vermont, also the only one for 140 years, until 2020. Additionally, Bates was almost certainly the first Black Sheriff elected outside the Reconstruction-era South.

== Early life and career ==
Bates was born into slavery in 1842 on the Shirley Plantation, located on the James River in Charles City County, Virginia. The maternal grandparents of Robert E. Lee owned the plantation, and decades later, Bates would regale dinner companions with memories of waiting on the future Confederate general and other Southern white elites at table. His enslavers used Bates as a house slave. During the American Civil War in March 1862, the Army of the Potomac invaded the Virginia Peninsula. In August 1862, Bates and his brother self-emancipated by fleeing to Union lines. He entered the service of Union officers at Berkeley Plantation and accompanied them to Washington, D.C. In the capital, Frederick E. Woodbridge, a newly elected U.S. Congressman from Vergennes, Vermont, hired Bates to work as his coachman circa 1863.

By 1866, Bates was accompanying Woodbridge on his visits home to Vergennes. When Woodbridge retired from Congress in 1869, Bates also settled in Vergennes, lodging next door to the Woodbridge family home in the future rectory of Saint Paul's Episcopal Church. Woodbridge and Bates became lifelong friends and colleagues. In 1879, the same year in which Woodbridge was elected mayor of Vergennes, Bates was elected sheriff and municipal police chief, having served as a special constable since 1875.

Vergennes, though chartered as a city, had only 1,570 residents recorded in the 1870 census, of whom thirteen were Black, or less than 1 percent. Nevertheless, Bates was actually the second African American elected to city office there: Philip Storms had been elected pound keeper twice in the mid-1830s.

== Law enforcement service ==
Election results suggest that Bates was resoundingly popular and well-respected in Vergennes. He won reelection as sheriff unanimously in 1880 and either "won easily or ran unopposed in subsequent annual elections for nearly three decades." He was elected sheriff a total of twenty-three times, and appointed twice, on an annual basis from 1879 to 1905, often serving concurrently in the appointed office of police chief. He lost his 1905 reelection campaign, only to be reelected by acclamation and returned to office in 1907.

Vermont newspapers described Bates as calm, commanding, self-disciplined, and competent. He arrested suspects in murder, grand larceny, forgery, and other crimes in Vergennes and nearby towns such as Panton and Ferrisburgh. In 1897, Bates and his deputy sheriff each received a $100 reward from the United States Post Office Department for their services in arresting two men who had robbed Vermont post offices three years earlier.

Bates was Vermont's first Black sheriff. The second Black chief law enforcement officer in Vermont, Brian Peete, took office in Montpelier in 2020, more than 140 years after Bates was first elected. On October 3, 2021, Vergennes unveiled a historical marker commemorating Bates at Vergennes City Park, along with an exhibit at Bixby Memorial Free Library. Governor Phil Scott designated October 3, 2021, as Sheriff Stephen Bates Day. The Life of Stephen Bates, a short documentary film directed by Chris Spencer, premiered at the Middlebury New Filmmakers Festival that same year. In 2023, the Virginia Department of Historic Resources revealed plans to erect a historical marker on Virginia State Route 5 near Bates's birthplace.

Bates was "almost certainly" the first Black sheriff elected outside the Reconstruction-era South.

== Personal life ==
Bates was literate and "almost entirely self-taught." He raised a family in Vergennes, attended Saint Paul's Episcopal Church, trained thoroughbred horses, campaigned for Republican candidates, and acted as an agent of the Vermont Humane Society. During the 1870s he held various odd jobs, importing horses for Woodbridge's son, Frederick A. Woodbridge, and guarding the Farmer's National Bank at night. In 1880, his house burned down. Contemporary sources did not specify the fire's cause—whether arson or accident is unknown—but the townsfolk raised $100 to help Bates rebuild.

Bates married Frances Mason of Elizabethtown, New York, in 1871. At the time of their marriage, Mason was working as a domestic servant and cook in the household of a retired hotelkeeper in Vergennes. The couple had two children: Rose Mary (born 1872) and Frederick Napoleon (born 1875).

Bates died from cardiac arrest while milking a cow in a neighbor's barn on June 10, 1907, at the age of 64. His wife had predeceased him in 1897 at the age of 45, also after suffering heart failure. Both were buried at Prospect Cemetery in Vergennes.
