= Vergennes Union High School =

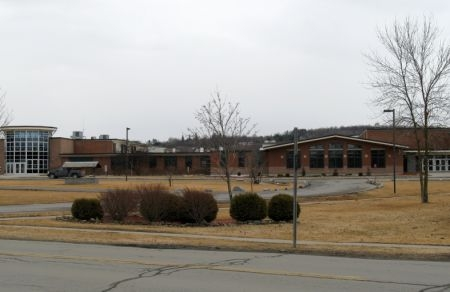
- VUHS Campus

Location
- 50 Monkton Rd. 50 Monkton Road; Vergennes, VT 05491; Northeastern United States; Vergennes, Addison, Vermont, 05491; United States; 44.172062°N 73.244112°W

Information
- School type: Public 7-12
- Motto: The Home of the Commodores
- Established: 1959
- School board: Vergennes Union High School Board of Directors
- School district: 5
- NCES District ID: 5000398
- Authority: The Addison Northwest School District
- Superintendent: Sheila Soule, Superintendent of Schools
- CEEB code: 460460
- Administrator: Melissa Wellicoff, Dean of Student Engagement, Pete Maneen, Director of Athletics and Activities,
- Principal: Jody Chamberlin Colden Golann
- Faculty: 44.83 (on FTE basis)
- Grades: 7-12
- Enrollment: 242 (2023-2024)
- Average class size: 14
- Student to teacher ratio: 7.22
- Language: English, ESL
- Hours in school day: 7.13 hours
- Campus type: Rural
- Colours: Blue and White
- Athletics conference: Northern Vermont Athletic Conference (NVAC)
- Sports: Soccer, Basketball, Baseball, Softball, Indoor and Outdoor Track and Field, Cross Country, Boys and Girls Lacrosse, Cheerleading, Golf, Rowing, Math, and Wrestling
- Mascot: Commodore
- Nickname: VUHS
- Team name: Commodores
- Rival: Mount Abraham Union High School
- USNWR ranking: 3714
- Newspaper: On The Horizon
- Communities served: The Addison Northwest School District (Northern Addison County)
- Feeder schools: Vergennes Union Elementary School, Ferrisburgh Central School
- Website: www.vuhs.org

Vergennes Union High School is a high school/junior high school of about 450 students in Vergennes, Vermont, United States. The school serves the city of Vergennes, as well as the towns of Addison, Ferrisburgh, Panton, and Waltham. This group of towns is the Addison Northwest School District.

== Campus ==
Aside from over 31 rooms, the school's main structural features are a cafeteria, library, auditorium (renovated 2014), two gymnasiums, a computer center, a wood and metal shop, a chorus room, and an acoustic music rehearsal chamber.

== Student life ==
Each student meets in an advisor led daily group called a Morning Meeting with 10-12 other students. Students have the same advisor for the two years spent in middle school and a different advisor for the four years spent in high school. In order for students to graduate, they must create and maintain a Graduation Portfolio that reflects their knowledge, skills, and understanding of particular topics. This is called a Performance Based Graduation Requirement (PBGR). Students who have taken German II or above have the opportunity to participate in a German exchange program that has been going on since 1990. German students from Bochum, Germany visit and stay in student host families in the fall semester, and Vergennes students take a trip to Germany during the spring semester. Students have the opportunity to visit historical landmarks such as the Berlin Wall in Berlin, Germany before they reach Bochum, Germany where they are hosted by the same German students who visited in the fall. Spanish students also have the opportunity to travel to Costa Rica as a school trip.

The school day runs from 8am-3:10pm.

Performance Based Graduation Requirements:

Personal Learning (PBGR 1) I understand personal wellness and my own strengths and weaknesses and use this knowledge in identifying goals, setting priorities, managing progress, and planning for my future.

Community Member (PBGR 2) I am an active and contributing member of my local, state, national, and global communities, in which I am working to develop a multi-faceted understanding of myself, of others, and of the natural world.

Research & Inquiry (PBGR 3) I use research and inquiry to acquire, analyze, synthesize and evaluate information and ideas from diverse contexts. I use these skills to explore a variety of issues, justify conclusions, and make decisions.

Problem Solving (PBGR 4) I solve problems and/or conduct investigations using appropriate math and science methodologies.

Reading (PBGR 5) I read, comprehend, and can respond to a variety of texts, and I am an active member of a literate community.

Fine Arts (PBGR 6) I create or perform in, and respond with understanding to, the Fine Arts through purpose, process, product, and growth.

Writing (PBGR 7) I use written communication and appropriate technical language for a variety of audiences and purposes.

Oral Communication (PBGR 8) I use oral communication for a variety of audiences and purposes.

Technology (PBGR 9) I use technology effectively to find, organize, and communicate information for a variety of purposes.

5 Guidelines of VUHS: 1. We are here; we are on time 2. We believe in personal integrity 3. We are respectful 4. We are kind 5. We challenge ourselves

Extracurricular activities include sports, the Commodore Jazz Band, pep band, the Commodore singers choral group, an annual musical theater production, the math team, the Green Team, and the FFA. The Vergennes Union High school band is currently led by director Parker Mann, who has often had students attend music festivals such as Districts, All States, New Englands, and even the all Eastern music festival. The VUHS chorus and Commodore Singers is led by Cailin O'Hara. An alternative learning program called the Walden Project takes place in Monkton and is run through the Willowell Foundation.

== Athletics ==
The school competes in Vermont Division III, except where noted. Sports include cheerleading, lacrosse, indoor and outdoor track and field, soccer, basketball, baseball, wrestling, golf, rowing, and cross country running.

Cross country, indoor track and field, and bass fishing are Division II

=== Recognition ===
Athletic teams from Vergennes Union High School have won multiple state championships over the years:

- Cross Country Running (5): 1952-53, 1959–60, 1960–61, 1962–63, 1968-69 (Division I)
- Boys' Soccer (1): 1982-83 (Division II)
- Girls' Soccer (5): 1983-84, 2001–02, 2002–03, 2006-07 (Division ll), 2025-26 (Division III)
- Boys' Basketball (4): 1968-69, 1984–85, 2000–01, 2012-13 (Division II)
- Girls' Basketball (2): 2004-05, 2005-06 (Division II)
- Cheerleading (6); 1987–88, 1988–89, 2005–06, 2006–07, 2007–08, 2008–09, 2016-17 (Division II)
- Wrestling (2): 1970-71 (Division I); 1974–75 (Division II)
- Baseball (2): 2006-07, 2011-12 (Division II)
- Softball (1): 1975-76 (Division II)

== Bicknell v. Vergennes Union High School ==
In 1979, the Vergennes Union High School Board of Directors ordered the removal of two books, The Wanderers and Dog Day Afternoon, from the school library's collection. The school librarian Elizabeth Phillips and others challenged the removal in the federal court case Bicknell v. Vergennes Union High School. A U.S. District Court judge dismissed the case holding that school boards had the final authority to determine the inclusion or removal of works from school library collections. In 1980, the United States Court of Appeals for the Second Circuit upheld the dismissal.

== Notable alumni ==
- Constance T. Houston, Vermont State Representative 1993-2006
