= Hawley House =

Hawley House may refer to:

in the United States

(by state then city or town)

- Thomas Hawley House, Monroe, Connecticut, listed on the National Register of Historic Places (NRHP)
- Ephraim Hawley House, Trumbull, Connecticut, NRHP-listed in Fairfield County
- Gideon Hawley House, Barnstable, Massachusetts, NRHP-listed
- Hildreth-Lord-Hawley Farm, Pittsford, New York, NRHP-listed
- Stewart-Hawley-Malloy House, Laurinburg, North Carolina, NRHP-listed in Scotland County
- Hawley's Ferry House, Ferrisburg, Vermont, NRHP-listed in Addison County
