= Champlain Arsenal =

19th-century fortification in Vermont, US

Coordinates: 44°10′11″N 73°15′46″W

Champlain Arsenal was a 19th-century fortification near Vergennes, Vermont. Two buildings, built in 1825, still stand and make up the oldest remaining buildings of the Vermont Industrial School, now a Job Corps center. The two arsenal buildings have been shuttered since the 1970s.

== Origins ==
The Army established this federal arsenal in 1826 or 1828. It contained quarters for officers, barracks, a magazine, ordnance storehouses, and munitions storehouses.

== Antebellum operations ==
Josiah Gorgas briefly served at Champlain Arsenal.

== First abandonment ==
The Army discontinued Champlain Arsenal in 1855.

== Civil War era ==
Champlain Arsenal reopened in 1861.

== Decommissioning ==
The Army left Champlain Arsenal in 1872. The War Department sold the site in 1873.
