= Rachel Robinson (disambiguation) =

Rachel Robinson (born 1922), is an American social activist, widow of baseball player Jackie Robinson and founder of the Jackie Robinson Foundation.

Rachel Robinson may also refer to:

- Rachael Robinson Elmer, American artist
- Rachel Robinson, American singer/songwriter (also as "Rachel Starshine Robinson") and actress, among others e.g. from The Visitor (Star Trek: Deep Space Nine)
- Rachel Robinson, contestant on Road Rules: Campus Crawl
