= Warren Van Wyck =

American politician

Member of the Vermont House of Representatives from the Addison-3 district
- Incumbent
- Assumed office February 7, 2013
- Preceded by: Gregory S. Clark

Personal details
- Born: October 25, 1952 (age 73) Paterson, New Jersey, U.S.
- Party: Republican
- Spouse: Jeanette Beenen
- Education: Calvin College

Warren Van Wyck (born October 25, 1952) is an American Republican politician. On February 7, 2013 he was appointed a member of the Vermont House of Representatives after the death of incumbent Gregory S. Clark.
