= Kitty Oxholm =

American politician from Vermont

Member of the Vermont House of Representatives from the Addison 3 district
- In office 2005–2008

Personal details
- Party: Republican

Thelma (Kitty) Oxholm is an American politician from Vermont. She was a Republican member of the Vermont House of Representatives for Addison 3 district.

She previously served as mayor of Vergennes, Vermont.
