= Hawley's Ferry House =

Historic house in Vermont, United States

- U.S. National Register of Historic Places
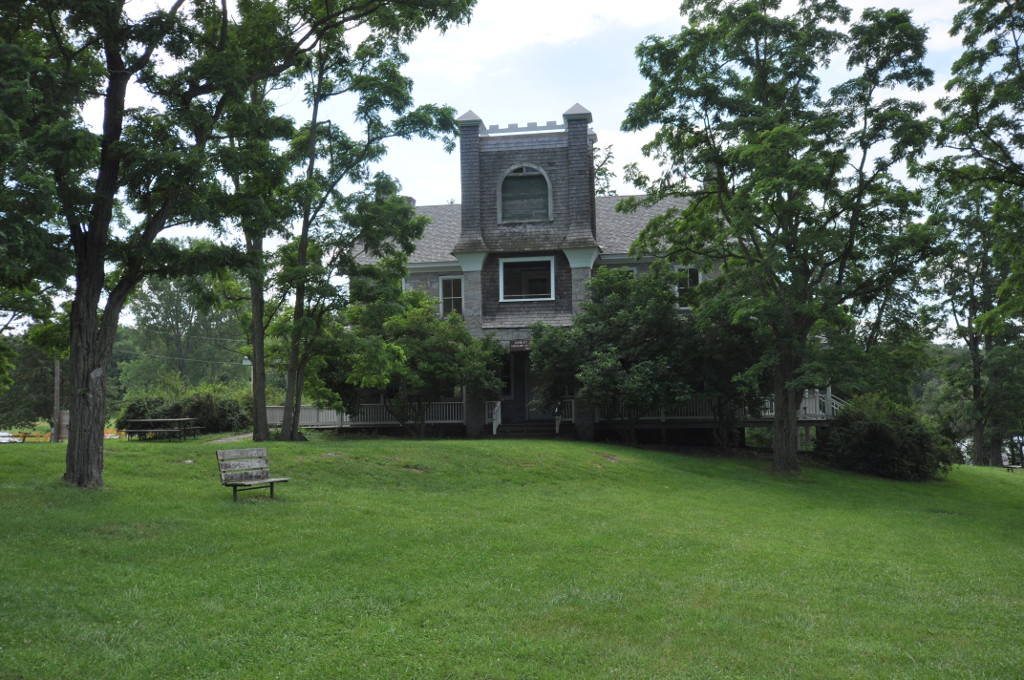

- Location within Vermont Location within the United States
- Location: Kingsland Bay State Park, Ferrisburgh, Vermont
- Coordinates: 44°14′26″N 73°17′52″W
- Area: 4.5 acres (1.8 ha)
- Built: 1790
- Built by: Hawley, Gideon
- NRHP reference No.: 78000224
- Added to NRHP: November 2, 1978

The Hawley's Ferry House, also known just as the Hawley House, is a historic house on the shore of Lake Champlain in Kingsland Bay State Park, Ferrisburgh, Vermont. Built about 1790, it is one of the few surviving 18th-century buildings on the Vermont side of the lake. It was listed on the National Register of Historic Places in 1978.

== Description and history ==
Kingsland Bay is a north-facing inlet on the east side of Lake Champlain, at a point where the lake briefly bends eastward. The bay is flanked by Hurlburt Point to the west and Macdonough Point to the east, both of which are contained in Kingsland Bay State Park, a day-use facility operated by the state. The Hawley House is located on the west side of Macdonough Point, where most of the park facilities are located. It is a 2 1/2-story gable-roofed structure, built out of local stone. Its walls are fairly uniformly 2 feet (0.61 m) thick. It is five bays wide and three deep, with a central hall plan. A three-story tower stands at the northeast corner, added about 1900.

The house was built about 1790 by Gideon Hawley, one of Ferrisburgh's first settlers. At the time, there were no roads in the area, and commerce on the lake was of vital importance. Hawley began operating a ferry across the lake about that time, which operated until about 1830. By then, roads had been built, to which much commerce moved, and the orientation of lake traffic became more north–south. Macdonough Point was an important militia muster site during the War of 1812 in advance of the important Battle of Plattsburgh. The building was used for many years as a farmhouse by local families, and was converted for use as a girls summer camp called Ecole Champlain about 1924. That property was acquired by the state and became the core of the state park in the 1970s.

== See also ==
- National Register of Historic Places listings in Addison County, Vermont
