= Union Meetinghouse (Ferrisburg, Vermont) =

Historic church in Vermont, United States

- U.S. National Register of Historic Places
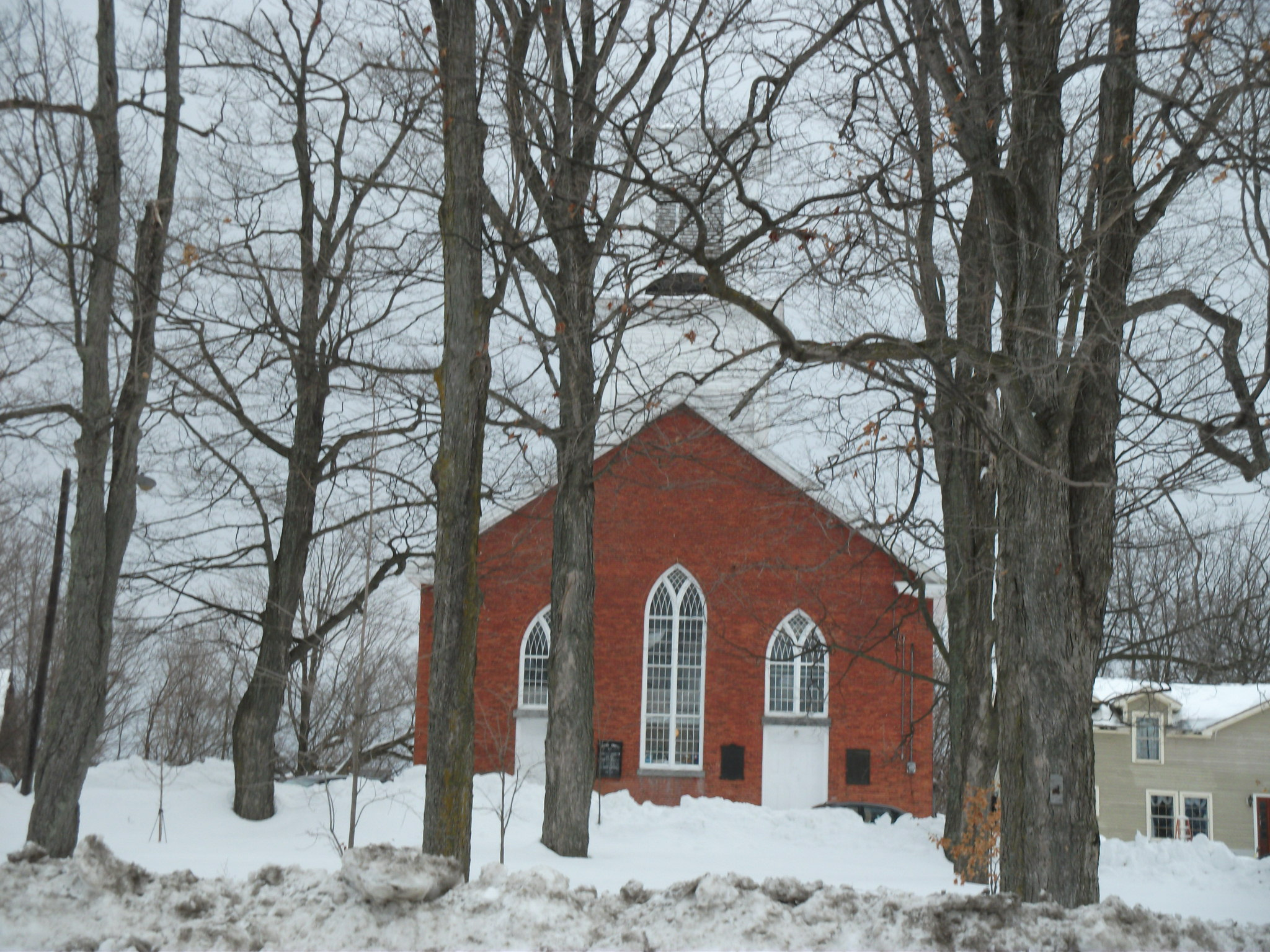

- Location within Vermont Location within the United States
- Location: U.S. 7, Ferrisburg, Vermont
- Coordinates: 44°12′22″N 73°14′45″W
- Area: less than one acre
- Built: 1840
- NRHP reference No.: 78000227
- Added to NRHP: February 23, 1978

The Union Meetinghouse (also once known as the Ferrisburg-Vergennes Baptist Church, and now the Ferrisburg Community Church) is a historic church on United States Route 7 in Ferrisburg, Vermont. Built in 1840, it is architecturally an eclectic combination of Federal period design with Gothic Revival features. It was listed on the National Register of Historic Places in 1978.

== Description and history ==
The Union Meetinghouse is one of the most prominent features of Ferrisburg's small town center, standing facing west at the northeast corner of US 7 and Middlebrook Road. It is a two-story brick building, with a gabled roof and limestone foundation. A two-stage belltower, a replica of the original (destroyed by fire in 1976) rises from the ridgeline, with a belfry featuring ogee-arched louvered openings. The brick of the walls is laid in American bond. The front facade is symmetrical, with two double-door entrances flanking a central tall Gothic-arched window with tracery. The entries are also topped by smaller Gothic windows. Similar windows are found on the building sides. The building originally had box pews, but these were removed in the 19th century in favor of auditorium-style seating.

The church was built in 1840 to serve a number of different religious groups in Ferrisburg. Its basic structure and massing are typical of earlier Federal period churches, with the Gothic windows adding a more recent (for the period) stylistic detail. Over time, the individual congregations built their own sanctuaries, and the use of this building declined. It was acquired by the town in 1898.

== See also ==
- National Register of Historic Places listings in Addison County, Vermont
