= Gregory S. Clark =

American politician

Gregory Stuart "Greg" Clark (July 19, 1947 – November 30, 2012) was an American politician who served in the Vermont House of Representatives. He was a member of the Republican Party. He represented the Addison-3 Representative District.

On November 30, 2012, Clark was killed by a driver while clearing snow and ice on his windshield on the shoulder of Route 7 in Waltham, Vermont. He was on his way to work at Mount Abraham Union High School, where he had taught for nearly 20 years.
