= Rowland Robinson =

American farmer, artist, and author (1833–1900)

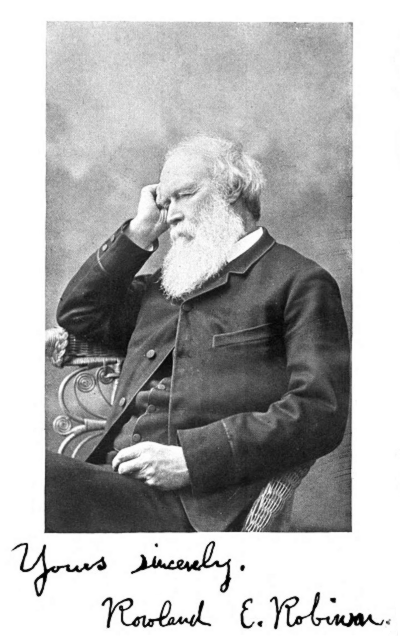
- Born: May 14, 1833; Ferrisburgh, Vermont
- Died: October 15, 1900 (aged 67); Ferrisburgh, Vermont
- Resting place: Union Cemetery; Ferrisburgh, Vermont
- Education: Ferrisburgh Academy
- Occupations: Author; Artist; Farmer
- Spouse: Ann (Anna) Stevens (m. 1870-1900, his death)
- Children: 3, including Rachael Robinson Elmer
- Writing career
- Period: Late 1800s–early 1900s
- Genres: Historical fiction Regional fiction
- Notable works: Uncle Lisha's Shop (1887); Danvis Folks (1894)

Rowland Evans Robinson (May 14, 1833 – October 15, 1900) was an American farmer, artist, and author. He is best known as the author of several novels and short stories that captured details about life in rural Vermont, including attitudes towards Native Americans, African Americans, and foreigners, as well as the pre-Civil War regional differences of the Northern and Southern states.

== Early life ==
Rowland Evans Robinson was born on May 14, 1833, at his family's farm, Rokeby in Ferrisburgh, Vermont. He was the youngest of four children born to Rowland Thomas Robinson and Rachael (Gilpin) Robinson, prominent Quakers and abolitionists who continued to improve Rokeby, which had been started by Rowland T. Robinson's father in the late 1700s. The younger Robinson attended the public schools of Ferrisburgh and Ferrisburgh Academy, but later said that he had been at best an indifferent student.

== Start of career ==
Rachael Robinson was a talented painter and drawer, and when Robinson showed an interest, his mother encouraged it. By the time he was a teenager, the butter tubs sent from Rokeby to markets in New York and other cities were often decorated with Robinson's work. At age 18, he moved to New York City intending to improve his skills by working for a draftsman, but he was disappointed in the experience and soon returned to Rokeby. In 1866, he returned to New York City, where he found work as an artist on works published by Orange Judd and Frank Leslie.

In 1870, Robinson married Ann Stevens (called Anna) of East Montpelier, Vermont. They were the parents of two daughters and a son -- Rachael Robinson Elmer (1878–1919), Rowland Thomas Robinson (1882–1951), and Mary Robinson Perkins (1884–1931). In 1873, Robinson began to experience difficulty with his vision and returned to Rokeby. In 1877, his wife suggested that Robinson turn to writing and illustrating his literary work. His article on foxhunting was published in Scribner's Monthly in early 1878 and was favorably received. Once inquiries about the anonymous author had identified Robinson, he was hired at Forest and Stream magazine, and he remained on the staff for several years. In addition, Robinson was a contributor to other periodicals, including The Atlantic.

Robinson was recognized as an early conservationist and advocate for the preservation of nature. He continued to paint and draw, and many of his works depicted agricultural life on the Ferrisburgh farm, hunting and fishing scenes, and natural settings including forests and lake sides.

== Later career ==
In 1883, Robinson turned exclusively to writing fiction, and produced a number of short stories and novels. His writing became known for his efforts to capture the natural speech patterns and dialects of New Englanders, French-Canadians, southerners, and others with whom he came into contact. In addition, he made an effort to incorporate into his stories the beliefs, values and cultures his characters represented, including racism, regionalism, and attitudes towards foreigners, which enabled him to depict contemporary 19th Century life in a realistic way.

Robinson's vision began to fail in 1887, possibly from glaucoma, but he continued to write with the aid of a grooved board which enabled him to avoid writing over sentences and paragraphs he had already committed to paper. His wife would then read his work back to him, make revisions, and reproduce them on a typewriter. By using this method, Robinson was able to continue writing almost until his death. Anna Robinson also served as Ferrisburg's town clerk, and when Rowland Robinson was hired by Houghton Mifflin Company to author a history of Vermont, Anna Robinson was his chief researcher.

== Death and burial ==
In 1899, Robinson was diagnosed with cancer; it was inoperable and confined him to bed for the last 18 months of his life. He died at Rokeby on October 15, 1900, and was buried at Union Cemetery in Ferrisburgh. Though raised as a Quaker, he became a Unitarian, and his funeral service was officiated by Effie McCollum Jones.

== Published works ==
Out of Bondage, readable pdf

Works Robinson authored include: Forest and Stream Fables (1886); Uncle Lisha's Shop (1887); Sam Lovel's Camps (1889); Vermont: Study of Independence (1892); Danvis Folks (1894); In New England Fields and Woods (1896); Uncle Lisha's Outing (1897); A Hero of Ticonderoga (1898); In the Green Woods (1899); A Danvis Pioneer (1900); Sam Lovel's Boy (1901); Hunting Without a Gun, and Other Papers (1905); Out of Bondage, and Other Stories (1905); and Silver Fields, and other Sketches of a Farmer-Sportsman (1921).

== Sources ==
=== Books ===
- Capace, Nancy (2000). Encyclopedia of Vermont. Santa Barbara, CA: Somerset Publishers. pp. 218–220. ISBN 978-0-403-09602-2.

=== Newspapers ===
- "City News: The Rev. Effie K. M. Jones". Barre Evening Telegram. Barre, VT. October 17, 1900. p. 3 – via Newspapers.com.

=== Online ===
- Bushnell, Mark (May 5, 2019). "Then Again: The life and legacy of Rowland Robinson". VT Digger. Montpelier, VT.
