= Vermont Industrial School =

- Vermont Reform School
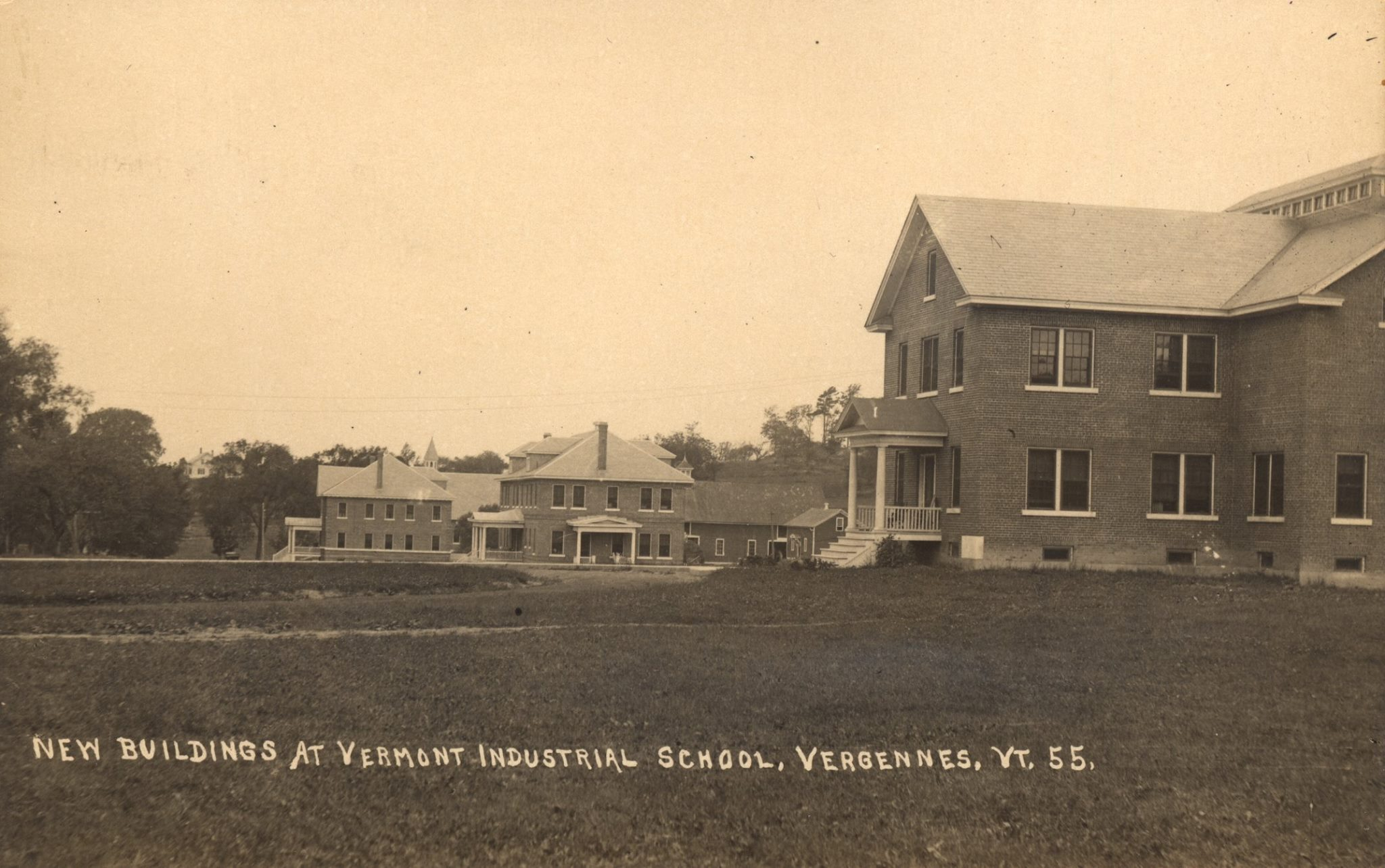
- Newly built structures during the Eugenics period.
- Former names: Champlain Arsenal (1826-1872)
- Alternative names: Vermont Reform School (1874-1900); The Weeks School (1937-1979)

General information
- Status: Repurposed
- Type: Institutional
- Location: Vergennes, Vermont, United States
- Current tenants: Northlands Job Corps Academy
- Groundbreaking: 1825, 1874
- Opened: 1874
- Renovated: 1874, 1924, 1979
- Closed: 1979
- Cost: $49,000 ($1.39 million in 2025 dollars)
- Owner: State of Vermont

Technical details
- Material: Foundation-Stone, Exterior-Brick, Roof-Slate

Design and construction
- Known for: Heavy usage of Eugenics practices

The Vermont Industrial School, which became the Weeks School, was a publicly funded reform school located along Otter Creek in Vergennes, Vermont. Sold to the State of Vermont by the United States Department of War in 1873, the grounds and a couple of remaining buildings were part of the Champlain Arsenal which had been vacated by the United States Army in 1872. The industrial school moved to the Vergennes site in 1874 from Waterbury following a fire that engulfed their previous school. In 1937, the name was changed to the Weeks School to memorialize John E. Weeks, the 61st governor of Vermont and former trustee of the school. The Weeks School was closed in 1979 due to nationwide deinstitutionalisation. The campus was soon leased to the United States Department of Labor and the Northlands Job Corps Academy opened, still occupying the buildings today. Two buildings of particular historic value are the stone Arsenal building and the brick Fairbanks building, both part of the Champlain Arsenal and were constructed in 1825.
