= Rokeby (Ferrisburg, Vermont) =

- Rokeby Museum
- U.S. National Register of Historic Places
- U.S. National Historic Landmark
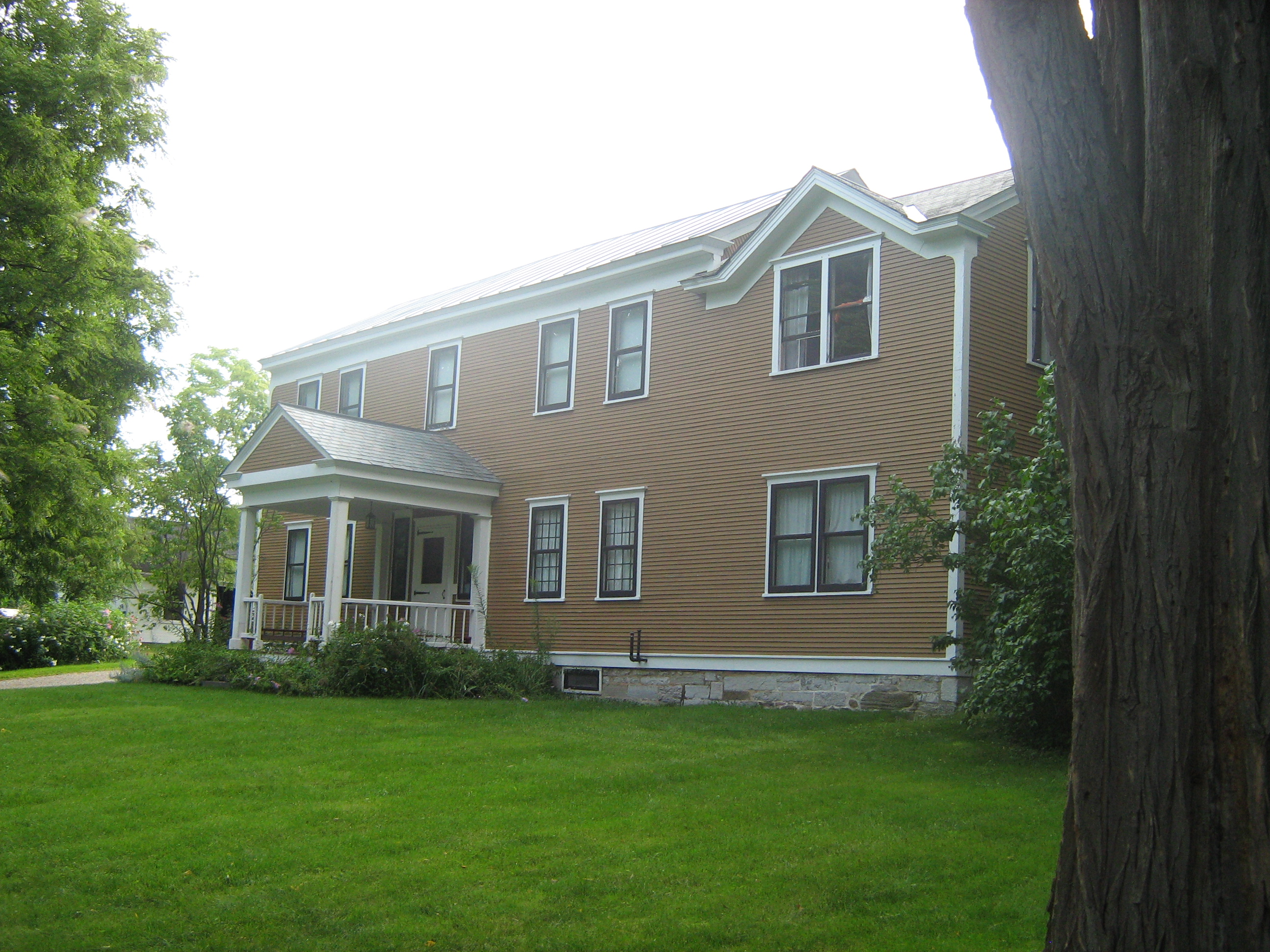

- Location within Vermont Location within the United States
- Location: 4334 US 7, Ferrisburgh, Vermont
- Coordinates: 44°13′21″N 73°14′17″W
- Area: 85 acres (34 ha)
- Built: c. 1780s
- NRHP reference No.: 74000201

Significant dates
- Added to NRHP: June 20, 1974
- Designated NHL: December 9, 1997

Rokeby Museum is a historic farm property and museum at 4334 United States Route 7 in Ferrisburgh, Vermont. The 90-acre (36 ha) property includes a 1780s farmstead, and eight agricultural outbuildings with permanent exhibits. Hiking trails cover more than 50 acres (20 ha) of the grounds. Rokeby is open from mid-May to mid-October each year. The property was designated a National Historic Landmark in 1997 for its association with Rowland T. Robinson, a Quaker and ardent abolitionist who openly sheltered escaped slaves at Rokeby as part of the Underground Railroad. Robinson's extensive correspondence is an essential archive giving insight into the practices of abolitionists and the operations of the railroad.

== Description and history ==
Rokeby Museum is set on the east side of United States Route 7 in the rural community of Ferrisburgh. The central focus of the property is a cluster of buildings, including the 1780s main house, a smokehouse, hen house, outhouse, creamery, tool shed, and other agricultural buildings. The property also includes foundational remnants of a barn and a school. The main house is a two-story Federal style wood-frame structure, with an older 1 1/2-story frame Cape style ell attached to its rear. What is now the main block of the house was built in 1814; the ell was built as a freestanding house in the 1780s by the Dakin family, who cleared the land. In 1793, the property was purchased by Thomas Rowland Robinson, a Quaker from Newport, Rhode Island.

For almost 200 years, the house was the home of the Robinson family, who were millers, farmers, abolitionists, authors, naturalists, and artists. In the 1830s and 1840s, under the auspices of Rowland Thomas Robinson, Rokeby served as a safe house along the Underground Railroad. Letters from the family of Rowland T. and Rachel Gilpin Robinson, devout Quakers and radical abolitionists, mention fugitive slaves by name and in some detail. The record of their correspondence gives an important view into the practices and methods of abolitionists and details about the operation of the Underground Railroad.

Rowland Robinson, a son of Rowland T. and Rachael Robinson, spent most of his life at Rokeby and became a celebrated author. Rowland Robinson's daughter Rachael Robinson Elmer was raised at Rokeby and was a celebrated artist.

Rokeby was listed on the National Register of Historic Places in 1974, and was declared a National Historic Landmark in 1997.

== Notable residents ==
- Delia Webster, abolitionist and teacher
- Rachael Robinson Elmer, painter
- Rowland Robinson, author

== See also ==
- List of National Historic Landmarks in Vermont
- List of the oldest buildings in Vermont
- National Register of Historic Places listings in Addison County, Vermont
