= Rachael Robinson Elmer =

American artist

- Born: July 28, 1878; Ferrisburg, Vermont
- Died: February 13, 1919 (aged 40)
- Education: Goddard Seminary
- Style: Impressionism
- Father: Rowland Robinson

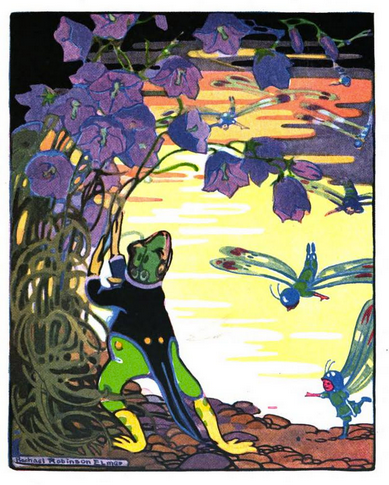
An illustration from Caroline Hofman's The Wise Gray Cat (1918), signed "Rachael Robinson Elder".

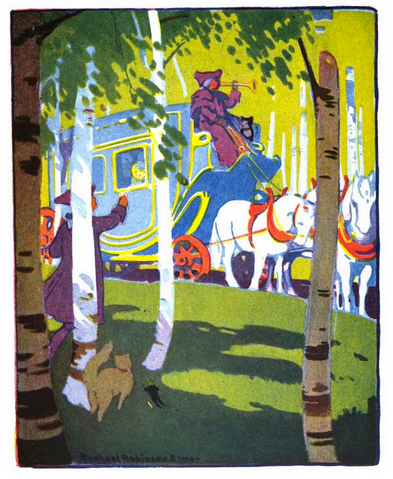
An illustration from Caroline Hofman's The Wise Gray Cat (1918), signed "Rachael Robinson Elder".

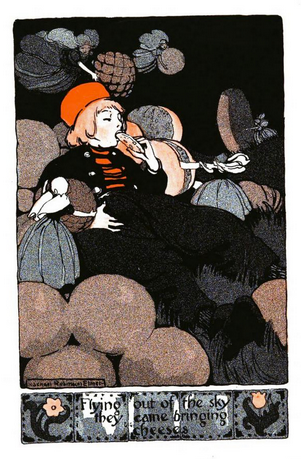
"Flying out of the sky/They came bringing cheeses"; frontispiece of W. E. Griffis, Dutch Fairy Tales for Young Folks (1918), signed "Rachael Robinson Elmer"

Rachael Robinson Elmer (July 28, 1878 – February 13, 1919), also seen as Rachel Robinson Elmer, was an American artist from Vermont, who gained notability as a painter of postcards of New York City, which "changed the world of American postcards".

== Early life and education ==
Rachael Robinson was born in 1878 at her parents' Rokeby farm in Ferrisburg, Vermont. (The family home is a National Historic Landmark.). She was from an artistic family: her father Rowland Robinson was an author and illustrator, her mother Anna Stevens Robinson a painter. Her grandparents, Rachel Gilpin Robinson (1799-1862) and Rowland Thomas Robinson (1796-1879), were active abolitionists and founders of the Vermont Anti-Slavery Society, who made Rokeby a stop on the Underground Railroad.

Beginning in 1891, at twelve years old, Rachael began taking a correspondence drawing course through the Chautauqua Society of Fine Arts. The Chautauqua Society of Fine Arts was founded in 1874. Their correspondence format became widespread in the United States between the 1870s to the 1930s. Still active today, the society made art education accessible to thousands of Americans around the country through distance learning.

She studied under artist and art critic Ernest Knaufft until 1895. When Rachael took the course, it cost $5 a year.

Rachael drew from plaster casts and created life drawings which she sent to her teacher. The plaster casts Rachael would draw from were copies of classic busts, an eye, and a foot. After drawing it, she added in the shadows. Knaufft gave detailed explanations of Rachael’s mistakes and encouraged her to observe how the light falls on the bust. Knaufft was rather open to the types of life drawings Rachael would create. At times she would draw her sister, Mary, and other times she would draw the various animals found on the farm at Rokeby.

After completing the drawings from the lesson and mailing them to her teacher, he would, then, send back the drawings and a letter with critiques and corrections. Although at first she viewed his critiques as a bit severe, she came to realize Knaufft was trying to get her to see as an artist, not just as an ordinary observer.

By 1893, Rachael’s drawing greatly improved and Knaufft offered her to study at his studio in New York City in the winter. She continued going down to his studio to study until 1895.

At the end of her studies with Knaufft, her life drawing had greatly improved and she was well versed in the pen and ink technique that she would continue to use during her illustration career. He focuses on her pen and ink technique throughout her studies with him since he was knowledgeable about the illustration world. Pen and ink drawing became common around the 1890s when photoengraving became the main way to produce images for publications, and was commonly used in newspaper, magazine, and book illustration.

After graduating from Goddard Seminary in Barre (city), Vermont in 1897, she lived in Burlington where she worked and taught in a studio. She returned to New York when she was 20, and joined the Art Students League. One of the formative influences on her art was Childe Hassam, specifically for his scenes of city life.

== Career ==
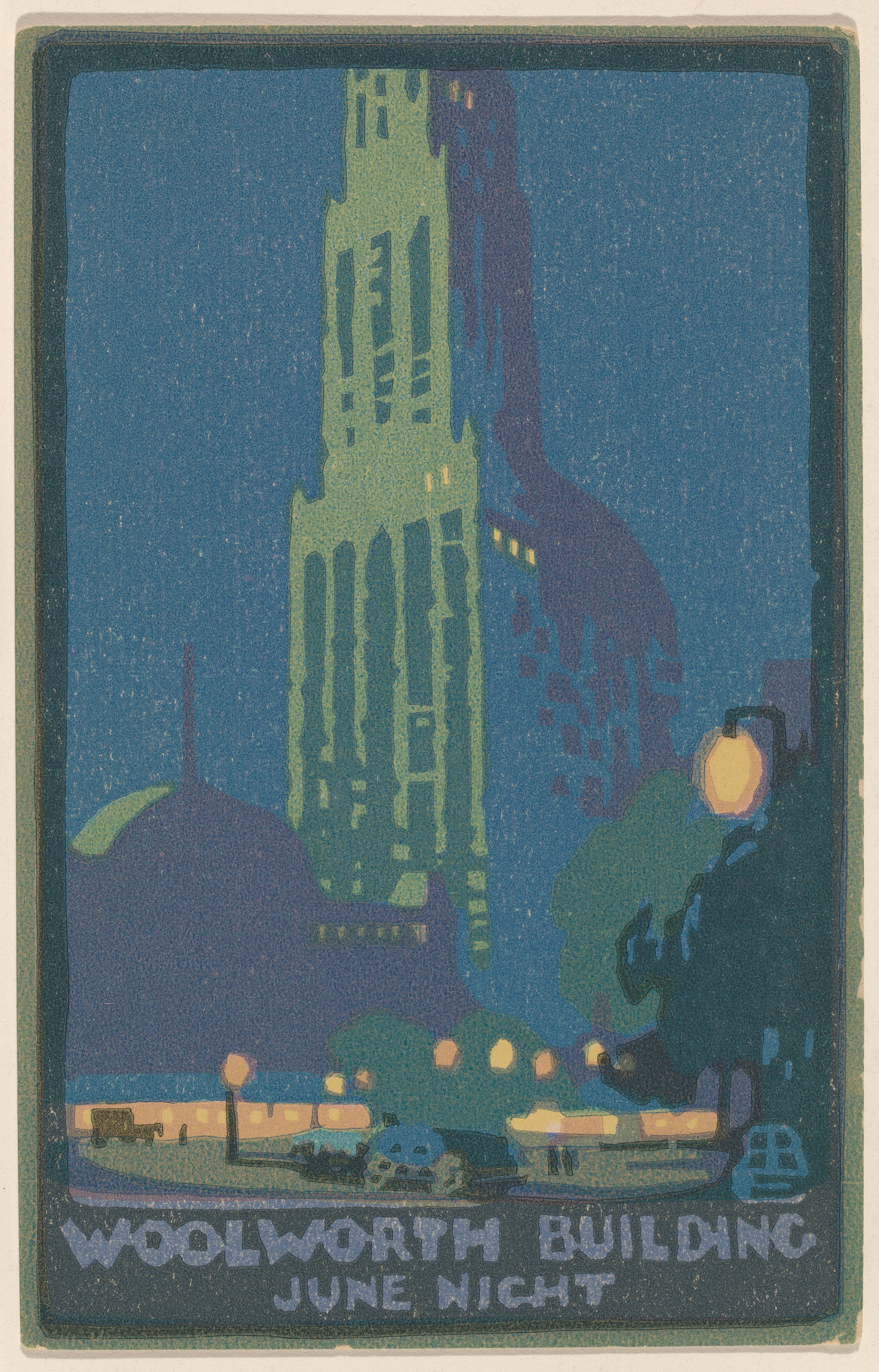
Offset lithograph, Woolworth Building June Night(1916), collection of the National Gallery of Art

A friend prompted her in 1911 to make a series of postcards portraying the city, and she chose twelve scenes, painting them in impressionistic style. It took her two years to find a publisher, but when she did, "Art Lover’s New York Series" (1914) became an overnight success, selling in "many upscale New York City boutiques", and inspired other artist to likewise paint postcards of city scenes. She published a second series (of only six cards) in 1914, this time in Art Deco style, but with less success. In 1918 she made postcards to raise funds for a church restoration in her hometown.

Rachael Robinson Elmer also illustrated children's books and periodicals, including several works by author Caroline Hofman. She also made illustrations for William Elliot Griffis's Dutch Fairy Tales for Young Folks (1918). During World War I, she created posters and was active with the "Bird and Tree Club", raising funds for replanting woodlands in wartorn France.

== Personal life ==
Rachael Robinson married Robert France Elmer in 1911. Rachael Robinson Elmer died of the Spanish flu in early 1919, at age 40.
