= Kingsland Bay State Park =

State park in Addison County, Vermont

- Location within Vermont
- Interactive map of Kingsland Bay State Park
- Location: Ferrisburgh, Vermont, United States
- Coordinates: 44°14′10″N 73°18′14″W
- Area: 264 acres (107 ha)
- Administrator: Vermont Department of Forests, Parks, and Recreation
- Website: Official website
- Vermont State Parks

Kingsland Bay State Park is a 264-acre state park on the shore of Lake Champlain in Ferrisburgh, Vermont, United States. Activities includes swimming, boating, fishing, hiking, picnicking, bicycling, wildlife watching, and winter sports. Facilities include boat rentals, a small beach with a snack bar, a picnic pavilion with two group grills and a smaller grill, other picnic tables, a horseshoe pit and toilets. There are several buildings available to rent for large group gatherings.

The State of Vermont has designated 50 acres as the Kingsland Bay Natural Area. The area includes two peninsulas on Lake Champlain separated by Kingsland Bay that support unspoiled natural plant communities, on the shoreline as well as on and behind their bluffs. The Hulburt (western) portion features a lake bluff cedar-pine forest.
