= Waltham, Vermont =

- Town
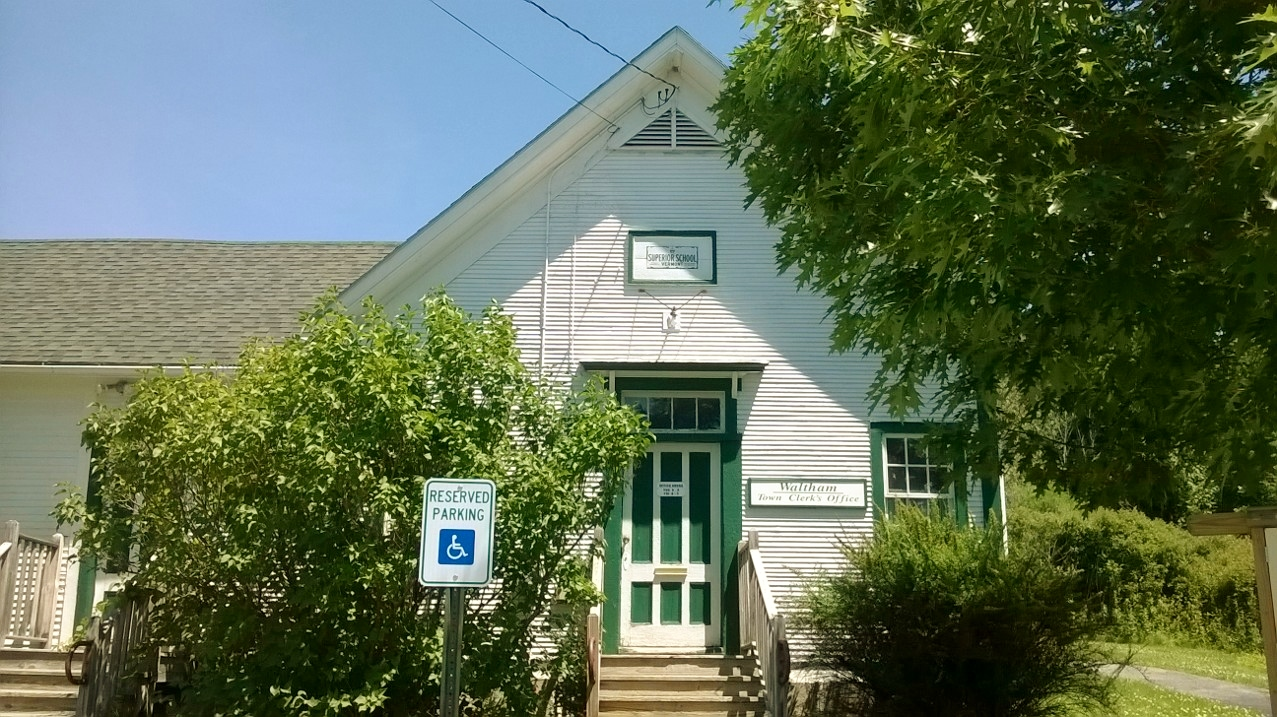
- Waltham Town Clerk's Office

- Location in Addison County and the state of Vermont
- Coordinates: 44°07′35″N 73°14′16″W
- Country: United States
- State: Vermont
- County: Addison

Area
  - Total: 9.1 sq mi (23.5 km^{2})
  - Land: 9.0 sq mi (23.2 km^{2})
  - Water: 0.12 sq mi (0.3 km^{2})
- Elevation: 420 ft (130 m)

Population (2020)
  - Total: 446
  - Density: 50/sq mi (19.2/km^{2})
- Time zone: UTC-5 (Eastern (EST))
  - Summer (DST): UTC-4 (EDT)
- ZIP code: 05491 (Vergennes)
- Area code: 802
- FIPS code: 50-76075
- GNIS feature ID: 1462240
- Website: www.walthamvt.org

Waltham is a town in Addison County, Vermont, United States. The population was 446 at the 2020 census.

== Geography ==
Waltham is located in northern Addison County, in the Champlain Valley. It is bordered by the city of Vergennes to the northwest, the town of Ferrisburgh to the north, New Haven to the east and south, Addison to the southwest, and Panton to the west. Otter Creek, one of the longest rivers in Vermont, forms the western border.

According to the United States Census Bureau, Waltham has a total area of 9.1 square miles (23.5 km^{2}), of which 9.0 square miles (23.2 km^{2}) is land and 0.12 square miles (0.3 km^{2}), or 1.31%, is water.

== Demographics ==
Historical population
Census	Pop.	Note	%±
1800	247		—
1810	244		−1.2%
1820	264		8.2%
1830	301		14.0%
1840	283		−6.0%
1850	270		−4.6%
1860	263		−2.6%
1870	249		−5.3%
1880	248		−0.4%
1890	255		2.8%
1900	264		3.5%
1910	202		−23.5%
1920	204		1.0%
1930	175		−14.2%
1940	184		5.1%
1950	193		4.9%
1960	186		−3.6%
1970	265		42.5%
1980	394		48.7%
1990	454		15.2%
2000	479		5.5%
2010	486		1.5%
2020	446		−8.2%
U.S. Decennial Census

As of the census of 2000, there were 479 people, 178 households, and 134 families residing in the town. The population density was 54.9 people per square mile (21.2/km^{2}). There were 197 housing units at an average density of 22.6 per square mile (8.7/km^{2}). The racial makeup of the town was 98.75% White, 0.42% African American, 0.63% Asian, 0.21% from other races. Hispanic or Latino of any race were 0.21% of the population and 0.10% Australian.

There were 178 households, out of which 37.6% had children under the age of 18 living with them, 66.3% were married couples living together, 6.2% had a female householder with no husband present, and 24.7% were non-families. 20.2% of all households were made up of individuals, and 5.6% had someone living alone who was 65 years of age or older. The average household size was 2.69 and the average family size was 3.10.

In the town, the age distribution of the population shows 28.8% under the age of 18, 4.8% from 18 to 24, 27.1% from 25 to 44, 29.6% from 45 to 64, and 9.6% who were 65 years of age or older. The median age was 39 years. For every 100 females, there were 105.6 males. For every 100 females age 18 and over, there were 109.2 males.

The median income for a household in the town was $46,389, and the median income for a family was $47,813. Males had a median income of $35,375 versus $24,444 for females. The per capita income for the town was $21,567. About 3.9% of families and 4.2% of the population were below the poverty line, including 2.5% of those under age 18 and 16.1% of those age 65 or over.

== Education ==
Waltham does not have its own school. The children of Waltham in grades K–6 are sent to Vergennes Elementary School in Vergennes, and the children in grades 7–12 are sent to Vergennes Union High School.
