= Vergennes, Vermont =

City in Vermont, United States

- City
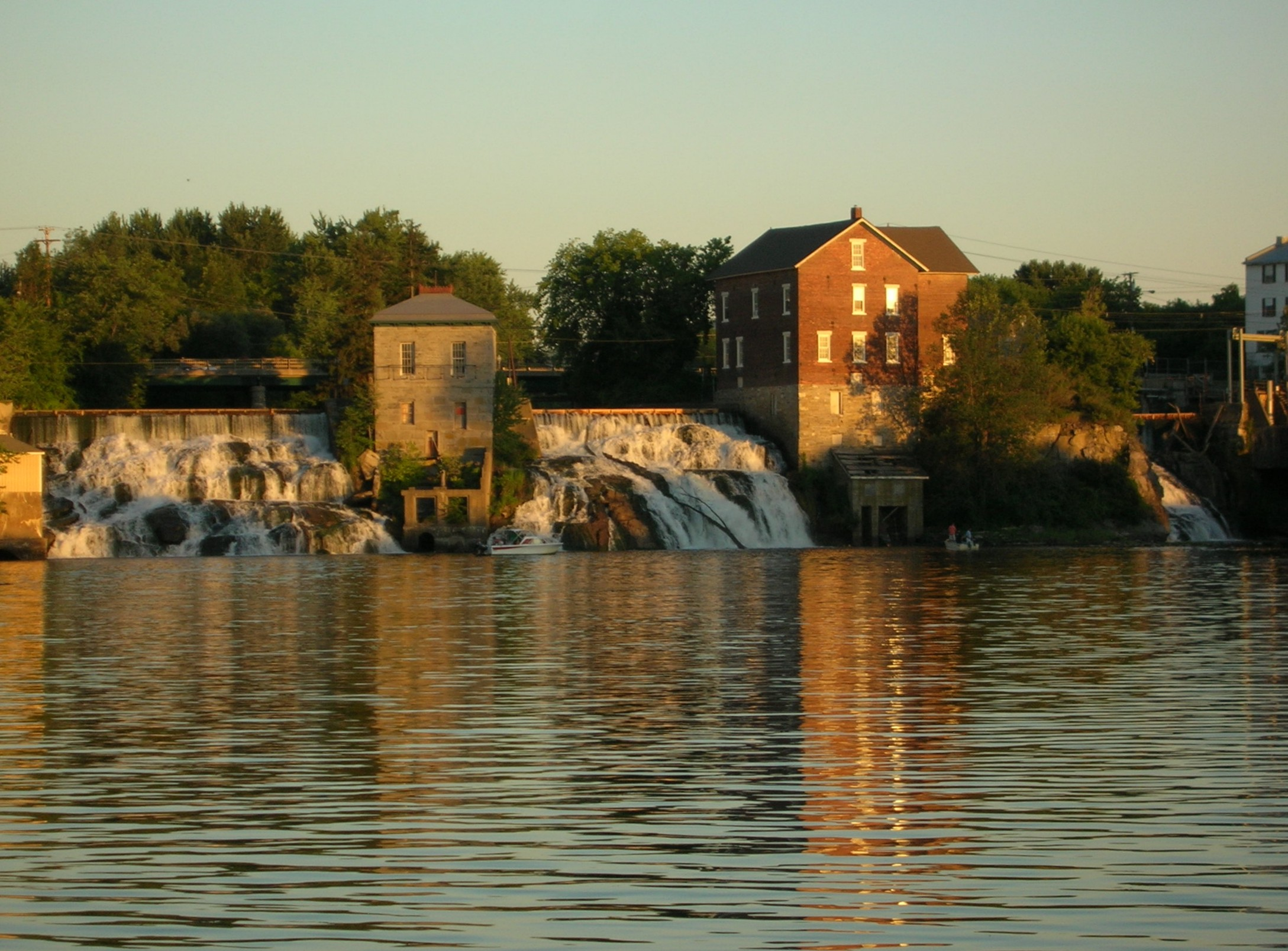
- Vergennes

- Seal
- Nickname: Little City on the Falls
- Location in Addison County and the state of Vermont
- Coordinates: 44°09′59″N 73°15′05″W
- Country: United States
- State: Vermont
- County: Addison
- Incorporated as a city: 1788

Government
  - Type: Council-manager
  - Mayor: Chris Bearor
  - City Council: Members: Zoe Kaslow; Richard "Dickie" Austin - Senior Alderman; Susan Rakowski; Cheryl Brinkman; Ian Huizenga; Jill Murray-Killon

Area
  - Total: 2.56 sq mi (6.62 km^{2})
  - Land: 2.48 sq mi (6.42 km^{2})
  - Water: 0.077 sq mi (0.20 km^{2})
- Elevation: 135 ft (41 m)

Population (2020)
  - Total: 2,553
  - Density: 1,030/sq mi (398/km^{2})
- Time zone: UTC−5 (Eastern (EST))
  - Summer (DST): UTC−4 (EDT)
- ZIP code: 05491
- Area code: 802
- FIPS code: 50-74650
- GNIS feature ID: 1462233
- Website: www.vergennes.org

Vergennes /vərˈdʒɛnz/ is a city located in the northwest quadrant of Addison County, Vermont, United States. The municipality is bordered by the towns of Ferrisburgh, Panton, and Waltham. As of the 2020 census, its population was 2,553. It is the smallest of Vermont's 10 cities in terms of population, though the city of Winooski has the smallest area. It was the first city chartered in the state of Vermont and is the only city in Addison County.

== History ==
Vergennes was settled in 1766 by Donald MacIntosh. It was established as a city in 1788, the only one in Vermont not to have been first chartered as a town or independent village. Instead, intersecting portions of the pre-existing towns of New Haven, Panton, and Ferrisburg at the Otter Creek Falls were combined to form Vergennes. It is the smallest city by population in Vermont.

The city is named for Frenchman Charles Gravier, comte de Vergennes, who greatly aided the rebel colonial effort in the American Revolutionary War.

Here, Thomas Macdonough built and armed the fleet that defeated the British on Lake Champlain during the War of 1812. The Monkton Iron Company (which was at the time the largest iron works in the nation) manufactured the fittings for Macdonough's fleet, as well as most of the cannon shot used by the United States Army in the north. The ore used was mined in nearby Monkton. USS Saratoga, USS Eagle, USS Ticonderoga, and USS Preble were built or refitted in Vergennes as a part of that fleet.

Organizers chose a city form of municipal government in anticipation of developing the area as an industrial center. The Otter Creek Falls provided power for mills and factories, and the close access to the Lake Champlain waterway was ideal for transportation both north and south. Industry boomed in the late 19th century; in particular, shipping connected to the Champlain Canal and wood-finishing related to lumber imported from Canada. As railways supplanted and bypassed the canal system, manufacturing declined in the city. A railroad spur from Ferrisburgh to the base of the falls proved a failure, as the grades were too steep for practical operations. Commercial decline continued in the 20th century, narrowing down to a few surviving companies. In the early years of the 21st century, a group of civic boosters and merchants improved the downtown area along Main Street and reconnected the city to its waterways. The resulting development, catering to tourists and transients, is hampered by centralization of land ownership and escalation of commercial rents.

In July 2022, Vergennes was reconnected to the national passenger rail network when Amtrak's Ethan Allen Express began serving Ferrisburgh–Vergennes station. The city had last seen passenger service in 1953, when the Rutland Railroad discontinued the Green Mountain Flyer (New York City - Montreal).

== Geography ==
According to the United States Census Bureau, the city has a total area of 2.5 square miles (6.5 km^{2}), of which 0.1 square miles (0.26 km^{2}) (4.0%) is covered by water.

Otter Creek flows north through the town. In the middle of town is a 37-foot (11 m) waterfall, with a large basin that occasionally floods.

== Demographics ==
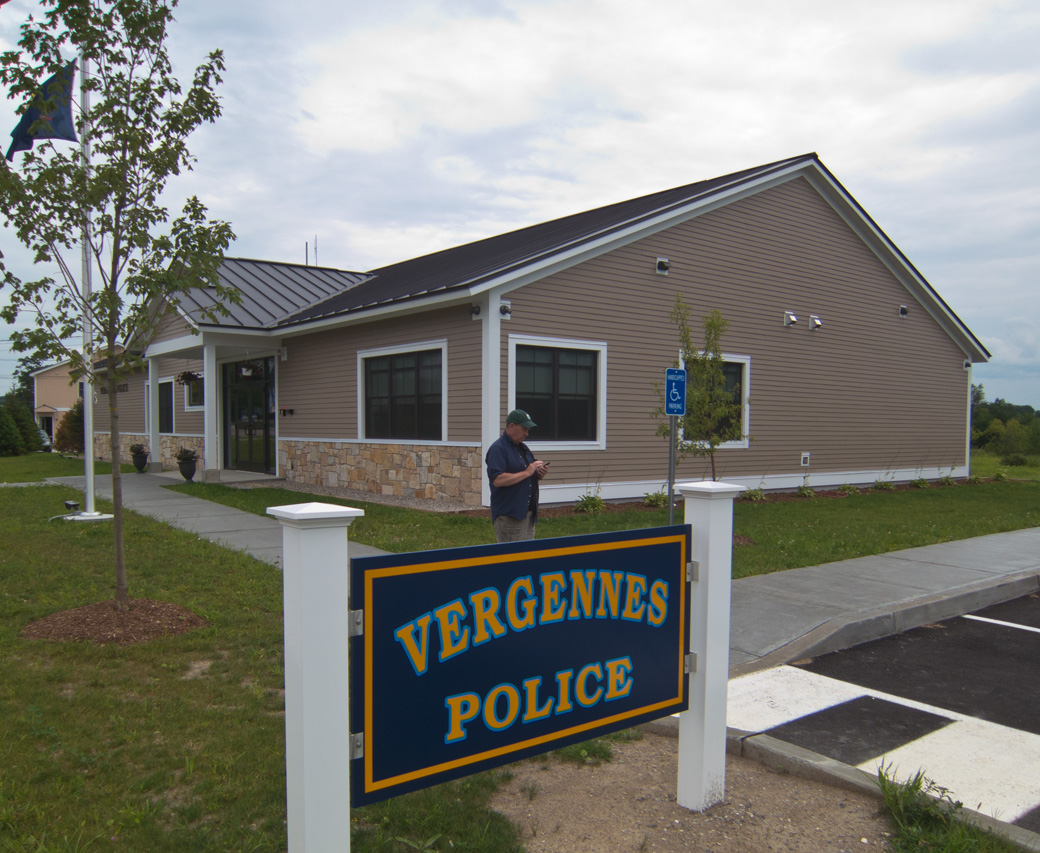
Vergennes Police Department

Historical population
Census	Pop.	Note	%±
1790	201		—
1800	516		156.7%
1810	835		61.8%
1820	817		−2.2%
1830	999		22.3%
1840	1,017		1.8%
1850	1,378		35.5%
1860	1,286		−6.7%
1870	1,570		22.1%
1880	1,782		13.5%
1890	1,773		−0.5%
1900	1,753		−1.1%
1910	1,483		−15.4%
1920	1,609		8.5%
1930	1,705		6.0%
1940	1,662		−2.5%
1950	1,736		4.5%
1960	1,921		10.7%
1970	2,242		16.7%
1980	2,273		1.4%
1990	2,578		13.4%
2000	2,741		6.3%
2010	2,588		−5.6%
2020	2,553		−1.4%
U.S. Decennial Census

=== 2020 census ===
As of the 2020 census, Vergennes had a population of 2,553. The median age was 43.7 years. 18.8% of residents were under the age of 18 and 19.7% of residents were 65 years of age or older. For every 100 females there were 85.8 males, and for every 100 females age 18 and over there were 85.0 males age 18 and over.

0.0% of residents lived in urban areas, while 100.0% lived in rural areas.

There were 1,134 households in Vergennes, of which 24.5% had children under the age of 18 living in them. Of all households, 42.7% were married-couple households, 17.9% were households with a male householder and no spouse or partner present, and 31.4% were households with a female householder and no spouse or partner present. About 33.4% of all households were made up of individuals and 15.8% had someone living alone who was 65 years of age or older.

There were 1,194 housing units, of which 5.0% were vacant. The homeowner vacancy rate was 1.2% and the rental vacancy rate was 1.9%.

Racial composition as of the 2020 census
Race	Number	Percent
White	2,352	92.1%
Black or African American	30	1.2%
American Indian and Alaska Native	16	0.6%
Asian	15	0.6%
Native Hawaiian and Other Pacific Islander	1	0.0%
Some other race	20	0.8%
Two or more races	119	4.7%
Hispanic or Latino (of any race)	54	2.1%

=== 2010 census ===
As of the census of 2010, 2,588 people, 979 households, and 632 families were residing in the city. The population density was 1,141.1 people per square mile (440.6 people/km^{2}). The 1,032 housing units had an average density of 429.6 units per square mile (165.9 units/km^{2}). The racial makeup of the city was 92.8% White, 3.0% African American, 0.3% Native American, 0.9% Asian, 0.7% from other races, and 2.3% from two or more races. Hispanics or Latinos of any race were 2.6% of the population.

Of the 979 households, 34.3% had children under 18 living with them, 48.8% were married couples living together, 11.6% had a female householder with no husband present, and 35.4% were not families. About 28.2% of all households were made up of individuals, and 12.5% had someone living alone who was 65 or older. The average household size was 2.47, and the average family size was 3.02.

In the city, the age distribution of the population was 28.4% under 18, 13.1% from 18 to 24, 27.8% from 25 to 44, 19.3% from 45 to 64, and 11.3% who were 65 or older. The median age was 33 years. For every 100 females, there were 100.4 males. For every 100 females 18 and over, there were 93.8 males.

The median income for a household in the city was $37,763, and for a family was $48,155. Males had a median income of $33,669 versus $20,527 for females. The per capita income for the city was $15,465. About 8.1% of families and 17.0% of the population were below the poverty line, including 8.5% of those under 18 and 16.0% of those 65 or over.

== Economy ==
Collins Aerospace (formerly UTC Aerospace, BF Goodrich Aerospace, and Simmonds Precision) is the major employer in the community.

== Arts and culture ==
The city features the Vergennes Opera House, which has weekly events involving the community and special guests, bands, singers, politicians, and theater groups. The city has a library, the Bixby Memorial Free Library, which hosts a variety of events such as a book club, writing workshops, children's story hour, and a bridge club.

The gallery Northern Daughters, which opened in 2016, closed in 2023.

== Education ==
Vergennes has four schools: Vergennes Union Elementary School, Vergennes Union High School, Champlain Valley Christian School, and Northlands Job Corps Center, the former Vermont Industrial School, later known as the Weeks School, which served as an orphanage and juvenile-delinquent home until the late 1970s, in the same facility. Additionally, Vergennes is served by the Patricia A. Hannaford Career Center, which provides career and technical education programs for high school students and adult learners, preparing them for success in the workforce and beyond.

== Infrastructure ==
=== Transportation ===
Vermont Route 22A runs through the city, and makes a junction with U.S. Highway 7 on the northern outskirts of Vergennes.

Amtrak's daily Ethan Allen Express train serves Ferrisburgh–Vergennes station, just north of the city. Other stops on the route include Burlington, Middlebury, Rutland, Albany, and New York City.

== Notable people ==
- Stephen Bates (1842–1907), sheriff of Vergennes for 25 years and the first Black sheriff in Vermont history
- Joseph K. Edgerton, US congressman from Indiana
- Frank L. Fish, associate justice of the Vermont Supreme Court
- Jabez G. Fitch, U.S. marshal for Vermont
- Margaret Foley, sculptor
- Ethan A. Hitchcock, US army officer and author
- Roswell Hopkins, Secretary of State of Vermont
- Charles B. Lawrence, chief justice of the Illinois Supreme Court
- Jeff Pidgeon, American screenwriter, animator and voice actor at Pixar
- John Pierpoint, chief justice of the Vermont Supreme Court
- Henry Porter, pitcher with the Milwaukee Brewers, Brooklyn Grays, and Kansas City Cowboys
- Daniel H. Pulcifer, Wisconsin state assemblyman and mayor of Shawano, Wisconsin
- Samuel Strong, militia officer and mayor of Vergennes
- Enoch Woodbridge, chief justice of the Vermont Supreme Court
- Frederick E. Woodbridge, US congressman and mayor of Vergennes
