= Panton, Vermont =

- Town
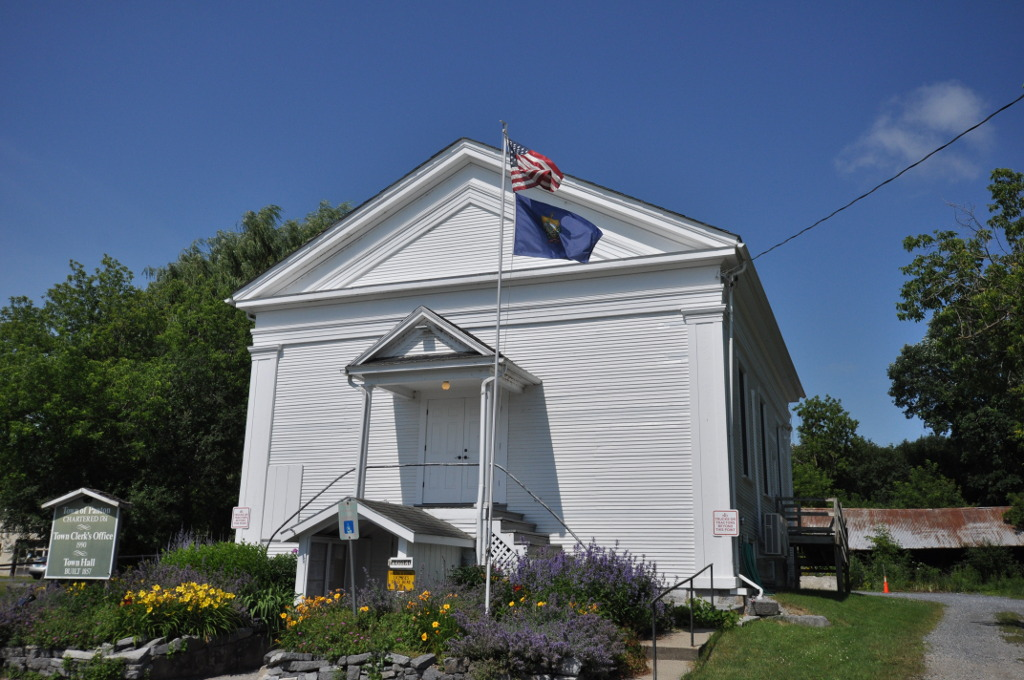
- Panton Town hall

- Logo

- Location in Addison County and the state of Vermont
- Coordinates: 44°08′15″N 73°20′12″W
- Country: United States
- State: Vermont
- County: Addison

Area
  - Total: 22.0 sq mi (57.1 km^{2})
  - Land: 15.5 sq mi (40.2 km^{2})
  - Water: 6.6 sq mi (17.0 km^{2})
- Elevation: 125 ft (38 m)

Population (2020)
  - Total: 646
  - Density: 42/sq mi (16.1/km^{2})
- Time zone: UTC-5 (Eastern (EST))
  - Summer (DST): UTC-4 (EDT)
- ZIP code: 05491
- Area code: 802
- FIPS code: 50-53950
- GNIS feature ID: 1462169
- Website: www.pantonvt.us

Panton is a town in Addison County, Vermont, United States. The population was 646 at the 2020 census.

== Geography ==
Panton is located in northwestern Addison County, along the New York–Vermont border. The western side of the town extends into Lake Champlain, and Dead Creek is a broad water body that crosses the entire town south to north near the town center. Otter Creek forms much of the eastern border of the town. Neighboring towns and cities are Ferrisburgh to the north, Vergennes to the northeast, Waltham to the east, and Addison to the south. Bordering across Lake Champlain, which is approximately 2 miles (3 km) wide in this area, is the town of Westport, New York.

According to the United States Census Bureau, Panton has a total area of 22.0 square miles (57.1 km^{2}), of which 15.5 square miles (40.2 km^{2}) is land and 6.6 square miles (17.0 km^{2}), or 29.70%, is water. As is common in the Champlain Valley, much of the land in Panton is flat and suitable for agriculture. For centuries, locals have quarried and used a native stone, known as Panton Stone, for building foundations and walls. The stone collected in Panton is from the Ordovician Crown Point Formation, therefore it is common to find fossils of invertebrates preserved in objects made from Panton Stone.

== Demographics ==
Historical population
Census	Pop.	Note	%±
1790	220		—
1800	363		65.0%
1810	520		43.3%
1820	546		5.0%
1830	605		10.8%
1840	670		10.7%
1850	559		−16.6%
1860	511		−8.6%
1870	390		−23.7%
1880	419		7.4%
1890	382		−8.8%
1900	409		7.1%
1910	345		−15.6%
1920	321		−7.0%
1930	306		−4.7%
1940	312		2.0%
1950	332		6.4%
1960	352		6.0%
1970	416		18.2%
1980	537		29.1%
1990	606		12.8%
2000	682		12.5%
2010	677		−0.7%
2020	646		−4.6%
U.S. Decennial Census

As of the census of 2000, there were 682 people, 248 households, and 192 families residing in the town. The population density was 44.1 people per square mile (17.0/km^{2}). There were 276 housing units at an average density of 17.8 per square mile (6.9/km^{2}). The racial makeup of the town was 96.92% White, 0.73% Native American, 0.15% Asian, and 2.20% from two or more races. Hispanic or Latino of any race were 0.15% of the population.

There were 248 households, out of which 33.1% had children under the age of 18 living with them, 68.1% were married couples living together, 6.5% had a female householder with no husband present, and 22.2% were non-families. 16.1% of all households were made up of individuals, and 8.5% had someone living alone who was 65 years of age or older. The average household size was 2.75 and the average family size was 3.06.

In the town, the age distribution of the population shows 25.2% under the age of 18, 7.0% from 18 to 24, 27.0% from 25 to 44, 27.1% from 45 to 64, and 13.6% who were 65 years of age or older. The median age was 41 years. For every 100 females, there were 98.8 males. For every 100 females age 18 and over, there were 98.4 males.

The median income for a household in the town was $46,184, and the median income for a family was $49,375. Males had a median income of $28,750 versus $24,375 for females. The per capita income for the town was $20,586. About 4.7% of families and 8.0% of the population were below the poverty line, including 10.0% of those under age 18 and 12.9% of those age 65 or over.

== History ==
Retreating from the Battle of Valcour Island, one of the first naval battles of the American Revolutionary War, American General Benedict Arnold ordered his men to run their five vessels aground in Ferris Bay (now called Arnold's Bay) in Panton, where the waters were too shallow for the larger British vessels to follow. These boats were stripped, and set on fire, with their flags still flying. Arnold, the last to land, personally torched his flagship Congress.

== Notable people ==
- Harriet Bishop, educator, writer, suffragist, and temperance activist
- George W. Grandey, politician lawyer
- Peter Santenello, videomaker, traveler, and entrepreneur
