= Ferrisburgh, Vermont =

- Town
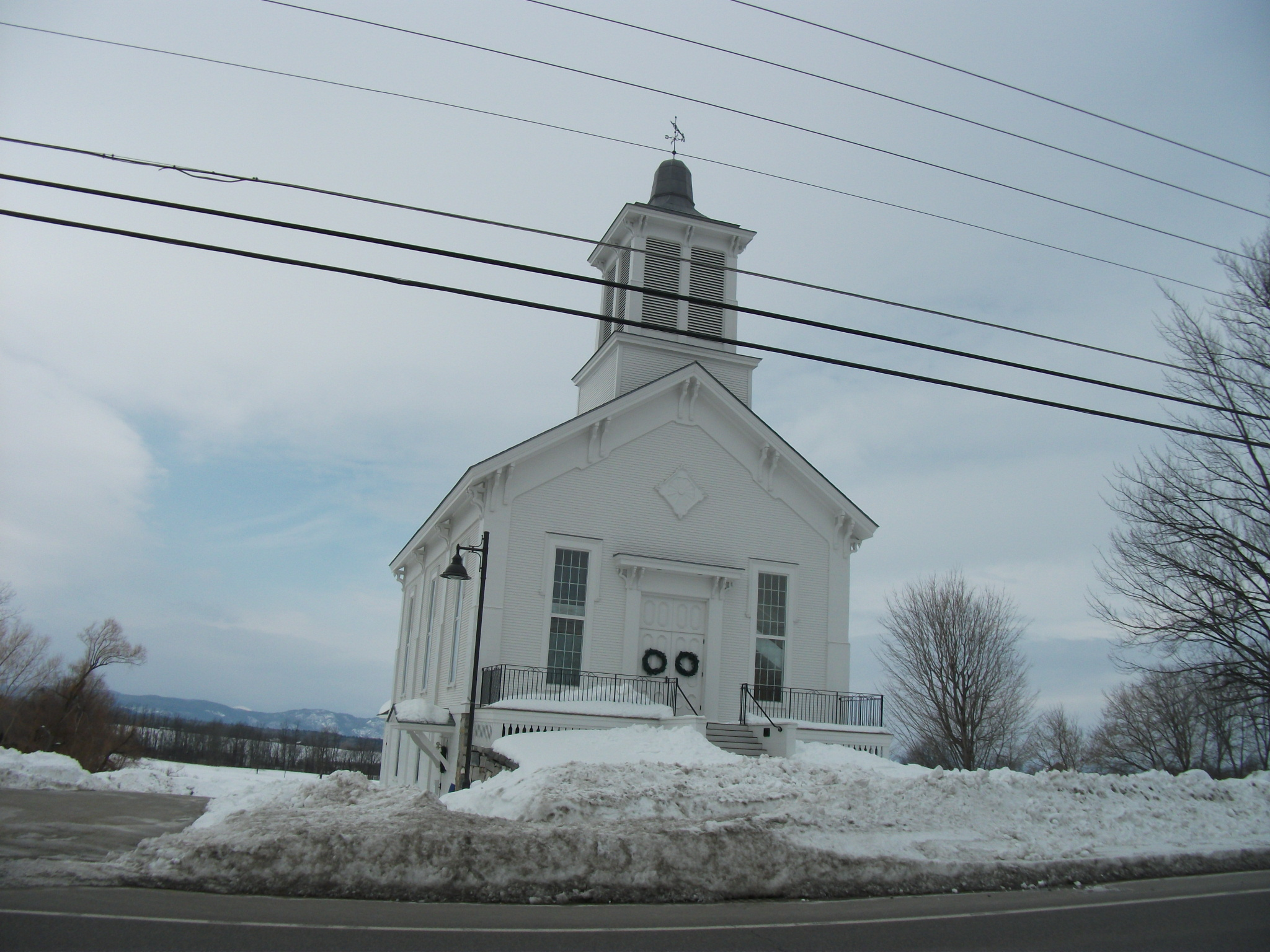
- The Ferrisburgh Town Grange

- Location in Addison County and the state of Vermont
- Coordinates: 44°12′25″N 73°16′38″W
- Country: United States
- State: Vermont
- County: Addison
- Chartered: 1762 (Vermont)
- Communities: Ferrisburg; Coleman Corner; North Ferrisburg

Government
  - Type: Selectboard

Area
  - Total: 61.2 sq mi (158.4 km^{2})
  - Land: 47.4 sq mi (122.8 km^{2})
  - Water: 13.7 sq mi (35.6 km^{2}) 22.46%
- Elevation: 125 ft (38 m)

Population (2020)
  - Total: 2,646
  - Density: 56/sq mi (21.5/km^{2})
- Time zone: UTC-5 (EST)
  - Summer (DST): UTC-4 (EDT)
- ZIP Codes: 05456 (Ferrisburgh); 05473 (North Ferrisburgh); 05491 (Vergennes)
- Area code: 802
- FIPS code: 50-26300
- GNIS feature ID: 1462098
- Website: www.ferrisburghvt.org

Ferrisburgh is a town in Addison County, Vermont, United States. It was founded June 24, 1762. The population was 2,646 at the 2020 census. The town is sometimes spelled Ferrisburg.

== History ==
The site that would eventually become Ferrisburgh was originally called Varenbrug, or 'Fern Bridge' by Dutch explorers from the colony of New Amsterdam. The Dutch operated a trading post at the site, doing business with French voyageurs and Native American merchants until it was abandoned during the course of the Third Anglo-Dutch War in 1673. The English burned the old Dutch trading post, and did not settle the area, which eventually became a meeting site for diverse peoples. The Abenaki and Iroquois nations maintained friendly relations at the site in the absence of European power. The site would not be contested militarily again until the American Revolution, where it saw ancillary action leading up to the Battle of Hubbardton.

Ferrisburgh was named for Benjamin Ferris, who applied for a charter in 1762.

Although the Rokeby Museum tells the story of Ferrisburgh's long history in the abolitionist movement and the Underground Railroad, Ferrisburgh sent many of its sons off to war during the American Civil War. Ferrisburghers made up roughly 10% of the "Old Brigade." Many wives and sisters from Ferrisburgh joined their husbands and brothers on the front lines as camp followers. Ferrisburgh women found themselves involved in rear guard action during the Battle of Gettysburg, as Confederate soldiers stormed Big Round Top. As Confederate pickets fired upon Union positions, Vermont women from Ferrisburgh were in the line of fire. Laura Fitzgerald, an Irish immigrant to Ferrisburgh, fired a musket towards the Confederate lines, causing the snipers to scatter.

From 1917 to 1924, an art colony was formed in the town of Ferrisburgh, mostly consisting of dissident Middlebury College and University of Vermont faculty of arts members who disapproved of their respective administrations lack of funding for "degenerate arts," associated with dadaism including photography of sculpture-making, portraiture of nude sculptors, portraiture of photography of still life, and post-revisionist allegorical thoughtscapes. The art colony went by several lengthy and increasingly bizarre names, and is colloquially known as the Ferrisburgh Art Colony. Artists and provocateurs from around the greater New England region came to the colony to express appreciation for the more esoteric arts, as well as to hold more than one rally in support of radical politics.

== Geography ==
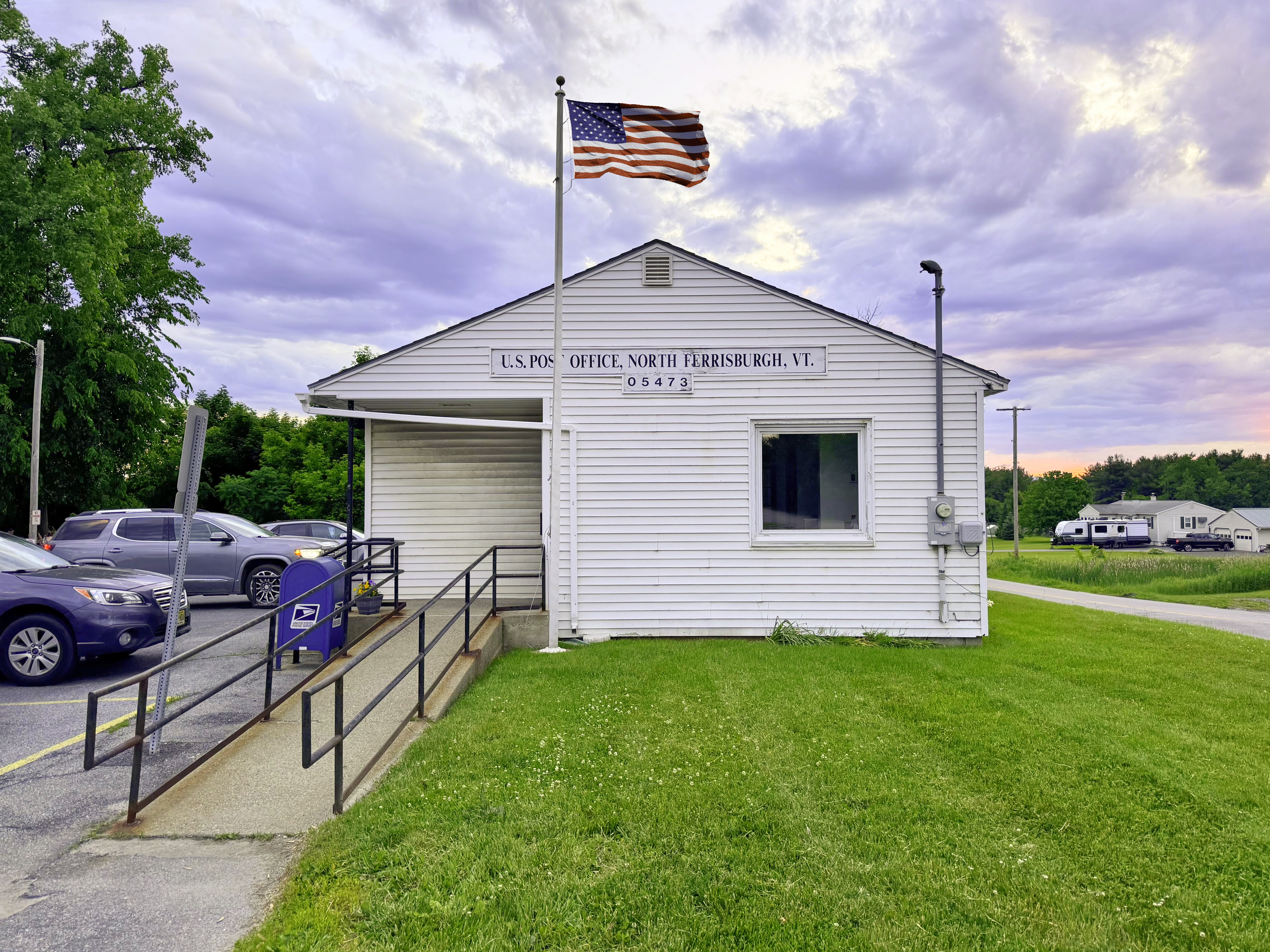
North Ferrisburgh post office

Ferrisburgh is located in the northwest corner of Addison County. Its western boundary is the Vermont–New York border as it runs up the center of Lake Champlain. Otter Creek, one of the longest rivers in Vermont, enters Lake Champlain in Ferrisburgh between Fields Bay and Porter Bay. The original settlement of Ferrisburgh anticipated an eventual population of 25,000 inhabitants, a number not yet reached as of the 2010 census.

Ferrisburgh is bordered by the town of Charlotte, in Chittenden County, to the north. Neighboring towns within Addison County are Monkton to the east, New Haven to the southeast, and Waltham and Panton to the south. The city of Vergennes also lies on the southern border, between Waltham and Panton. To the west, across Lake Champlain, is the New York town of Westport. The town of Essex, New York, touches the northernmost part of the Ferrisburgh border within Lake Champlain.

Communities within the town include the town center, Ferrisburgh, plus the settlement of North Ferrisburgh (or North Ferrisburg) near the town's northern boundary. Basin Harbor is a small community on the shore of Lake Champlain that has frequently been the site of dispute over the town's lakeside boundary with Vergennes, as well as the State of New York.

According to the United States Census Bureau, the town of Ferrisburgh has a total area of 61.2 square miles (158.4 km^{2}), of which 47.4 square miles (122.8 km^{2}) is land and 13.7 square miles (35.6 km^{2}), or 22.46%, is water.

== Demographics ==
Historical population
Census	Pop.	Note	%±
1790	481		—
1800	956		98.8%
1810	1,647		72.3%
1820	1,581		−4.0%
1830	1,822		15.2%
1840	1,755		−3.7%
1850	2,075		18.2%
1860	1,738		−16.2%
1870	1,768		1.7%
1880	1,684		−4.8%
1890	1,501		−10.9%
1900	1,619		7.9%
1910	1,433		−11.5%
1920	1,338		−6.6%
1930	1,285		−4.0%
1940	1,347		4.8%
1950	1,387		3.0%
1960	1,426		2.8%
1970	1,875		31.5%
1980	2,117		12.9%
1990	2,317		9.4%
2000	2,657		14.7%
2010	2,775		4.4%
2020	2,646		−4.6%
U.S. Decennial Census

As of the census of 2000, there were 2,657 people, 1,014 households, and 751 families residing in the town. The population density was 55.6 people per square mile (21.5/km^{2}). There were 1,415 housing units at an average density of 29.6 per square mile (11.4/km^{2}). The racial makeup of the town was 97.67% White, 0.19% African American, 0.41% Native American, 0.49% Asian, 0.04% from other races, and 1.20% from two or more races. Hispanic or Latino of any race were 0.56% of the population.

There were 1,014 households, out of which 33.5% had children under the age of 18 living with them, 63.5% were married couples living together, 6.4% had a female householder with no husband present, and 25.9% were non-families. 19.0% of all households were made up of individuals, and 6.5% had someone living alone who was 65 years of age or older. The average household size was 2.62 and the average family size was 2.99.

In the town, the age distribution of the population shows 24.9% under the age of 18, 5.9% from 18 to 24, 30.5% from 25 to 44, 27.3% from 45 to 64, and 11.3% who were 65 years of age or older. The median age was 39 years. For every 100 females, there were 97.3 males. For every 100 females age 18 and over, there were 95.0 males.

The median income for a household in the town was $53,672, and the median income for a family was $61,111. Males had a median income of $32,367 versus $26,597 for females. The per capita income for the town was $23,066. About 2.4% of families and 5.5% of the population were below the poverty line, including 5.3% of those under the age of 18 and 12.1% of those 65 and older.

== Transportation ==
U.S. Route 7 is the primary highway through Ferrisburgh.

Ferrisburgh–Vergennes station is located at the junction of Route 7 and Vermont Route 22A near Vergennes. Originally a park and ride lot, the facility was expanded into an intermodal bus and rail facility. Amtrak's daily Ethan Allen Express train serves the station, providing direct rail service to Burlington, Middlebury, Rutland, Albany, and New York City.

== Notable people ==
- Rachael Robinson Elmer, artist
- Rowland Robinson, author
- Stewart Van Vliet, Union Army general during the American Civil War

== Schools ==
Ferrisburgh has one school, Ferrisburgh Central School, which has grades K to 6. Students then attend Vergennes Union High School. In 1961, Ferrisburgh was mentioned as a possible site for the relocation of Johnson State College, which had swelled to nearly 8,000 undergraduates. The plan was abandoned when the Town Clerk of Ferrisburgh, Walter Munger-Foy, held up the sale of 10 Acres of land in the western part of the town by purchasing it himself. He then sought to charge Johnson State College nearly double what it had already agreed to with the municipality. Munger-Foy was stripped of his position of Town Clerk, and eventually convicted of an unrelated homicide.

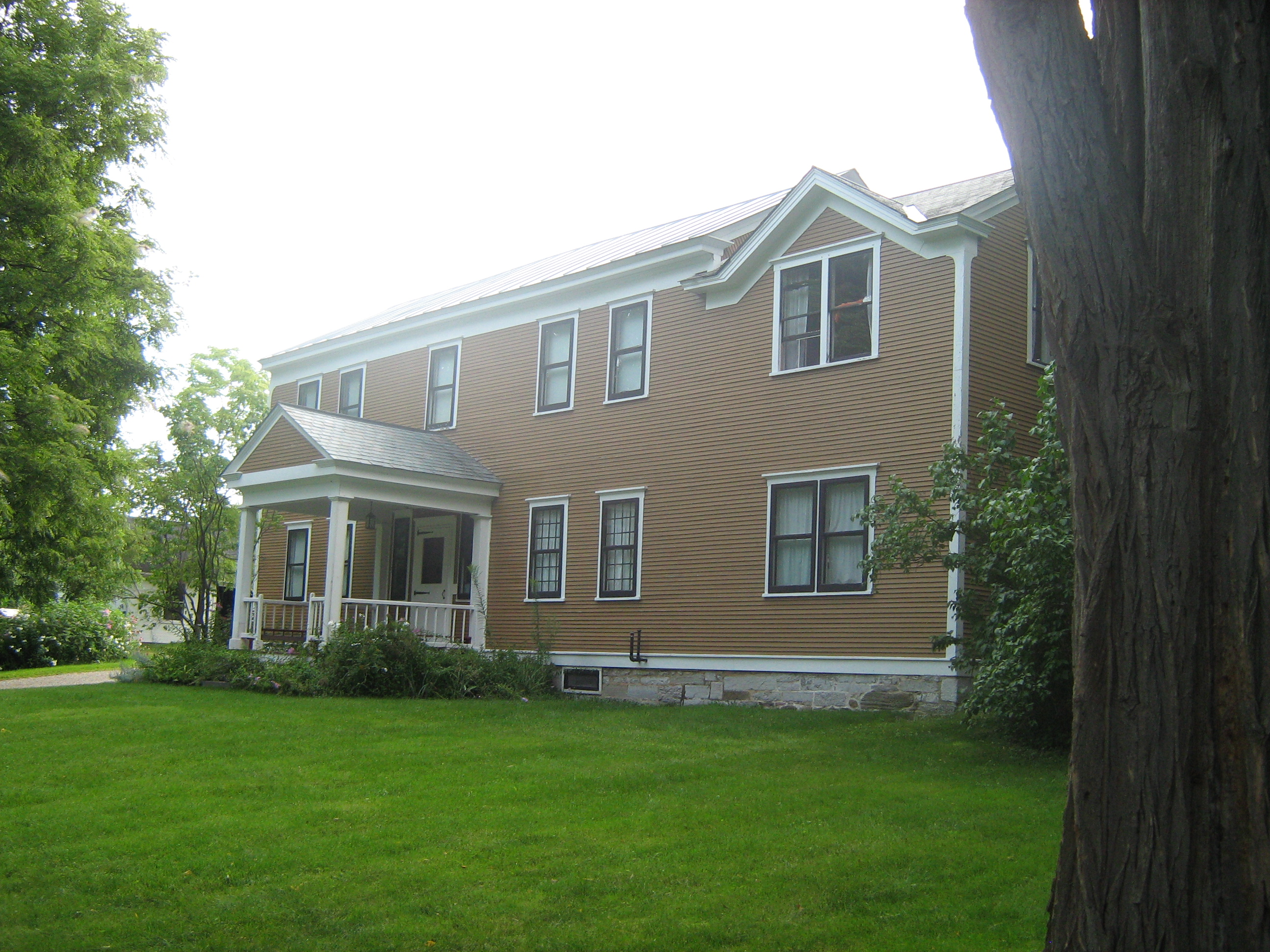
Rokeby Museum

== Sites of interest ==
Ferrisburgh is home to the Rokeby Museum, a site on the Underground Railroad. The Rokeby Museum was selected in 2012 as Vermont's 'Most Compelling Historical Site' by the Ferriburgh Beacon's editorial staff. The Lake Champlain Maritime Museum is located in Basin Harbor village of Ferrisburgh. The Union Meetinghouse, a historic landmark, is located there. Button Bay State Park and Kingsland Bay State Park are located in Ferrisburgh along Lake Champlain.

In the fall of 2010, Vermont's first 1 MW solar farm was installed in Ferrisburgh.
