= 2012 Vermont Senate election =

- November 6, 2012

All 30 seats in the Vermont Senate 15 (plus the Lt. Gov.) seats needed for a majority

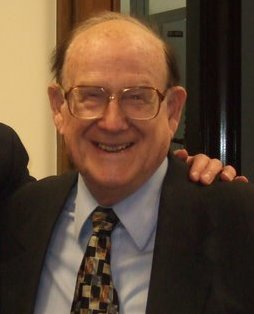

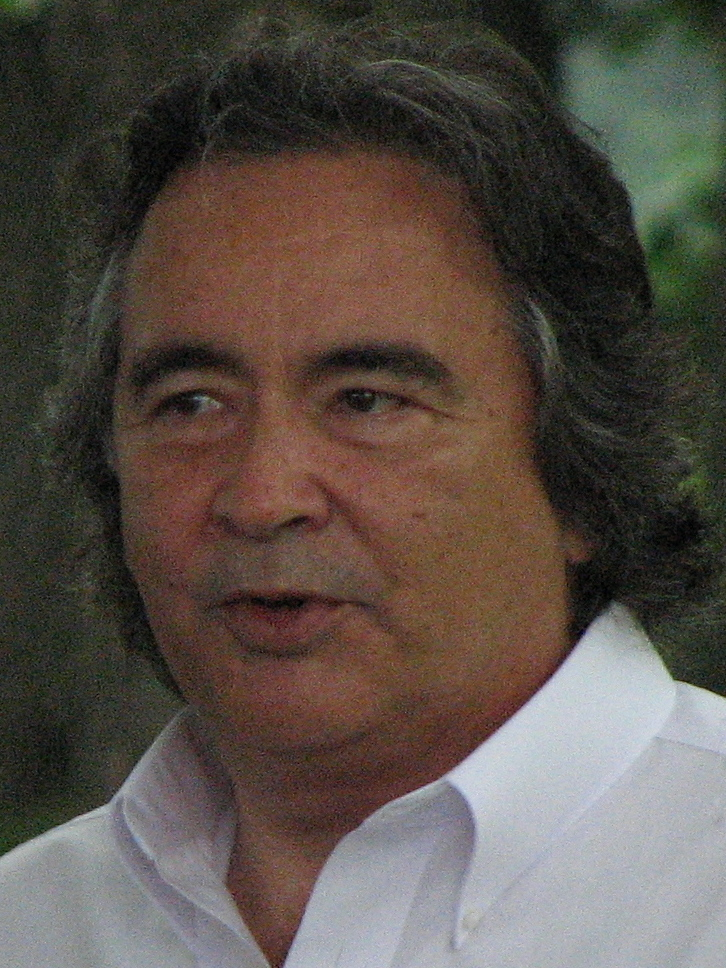
	Majority party	Minority party	Third party
Leader	John F. Campbell	William T. Doyle	Anthony Pollina
Party	Democratic	Republican	Progressive
Leader since	January 5, 2011	2010
Leader's seat	Windsor District	Washington District	Washington District
Last election	21	8	1
Seats after	21	7	2
Seat change	Steady	▼1	▲1
President pro tempore before election
John F. Campbell
Democratic
Elected President pro tempore
John F. Campbell
Democratic

The 2012 Vermont Senate election was held on November 6, 2012, to determine which party would control the Vermont Senate for the following two years in the 2013-2014 Vermont General Assembly. All 30 seats were up for election and the primary was held on August 28, 2012. Prior to the election, 21 seats were held by Democrats, 8 seats were held by Republicans and a single seat was held by the Progressives. The general election saw the Democrats holding on to their majority without losing any seats, while the Republicans lost a single seat and the Progressives gained a single seat.

== Predictions ==
Source	Ranking	As of
Governing	Safe D	October 24, 2012

== Retirements ==
=== Democrats ===
1. Addison District: Harold W. Giard retired.
2. Chittenden District: Hinda Miller retired.
3. Franklin District: Sara Branon Kittell retired.

=== Republicans ===
1. Rutland District: Margaret Flory retired.
2. Franklin District: Randy Brock retired.
3. Essex-Orleans District: Vincent Illuzzi retired.

== Results ==
=== Addison District ===
Addison District election, 2012
Party	Candidate	Votes	%
Democratic	Claire D. Ayer (incumbent)	12,925	46.40%
Democratic	Christopher A. Bray	9,904	35.50%
Independent	Robert Wagner	5,059	18.10%
Total votes		27,888	100.0%
Democratic hold			
Democratic hold			

=== Bennington District ===
Bennington District election, 2012
Party	Candidate	Votes	%
Democratic	Dick Sears (incumbent)	13,718	55.40%
Democratic	Robert Hartwell (incumbent)	11,048	44.60%
Total votes		24,766	100.0%
Democratic hold			
Democratic hold			

=== Caledonia District ===
Caledonia District election, 2012
Party	Candidate	Votes	%
Democratic	Jane Kitchel (incumbent)	9,934	34.10%
Republican	Joe Benning (incumbent)	7,969	27.40%
Republican	David Dill	5,619	19.30%
Democratic	Stephen Amos	5,584	19.20%
Total votes		29,106	100.0%
Democratic hold			
Republican hold			

=== Chittenden District ===
Chittenden District election, 2012
Party	Candidate	Votes	%
Democratic	Tim Ashe (incumbent)	37,357	13.30%
Democratic	Virginia V. Lyons (incumbent)	34,957	12.40%
Democratic	Sally Fox (incumbent)	34,909	12.40%
Progressive	David Zuckerman	32,253	11.40%
Republican	Diane B. Snelling (incumbent)	31,523	11.20%
Democratic	Philip Baruth (incumbent)	30,924	11.00%
Democratic	Debbie Ingram	23,441	8.30%
Independent	Bob kiss	12,324	4.40%
Independent	Patrick Brown	12,217	4.30%
Tea Party	Shelley Palmer	8,362	3.00%
Independent	Robert Letovsky	8,321	3.00%
Independent	Sean Selby	6,157	2.20%
Green	Larkin Forney	5,618	2.00%
Progressive	Richard Jeroloman	3,322	1.20%
Total votes		281,703	100.0%
Democratic hold			
Democratic hold			
Democratic hold			
Progressive gain from Democratic			
Republican hold			
Democratic hold			

=== Essex-Orleans District ===
Essex-Orleans District election, 2012
Party	Candidate	Votes	%
Democratic	Robert A. Starr (incumbent)	8,228	30.60%
Democratic	John S. Rodgers	7,379	27.40%
Republican	Robert W. Lewis	7,234	26.90%
Republican	Jay Dudley	4,087	15.20%
Total votes		26,928	100.0%
Democratic hold			
Democratic gain from Republican			

=== Franklin District ===
Franklin District election, 2012
Party	Candidate	Votes	%
Republican	Norman H. McAllister	7,732	23.50%
Democratic	Donald Collins	7,433	22.60%
Republican	Dustin Allard Degree	7,407	22.50%
Democratic	Caroline Bright	7,043	21.40%
Independent	Judith McLaughlin	1,999	6.10%
Peace and Prosperity	Peter Moss	1,291	3.90%
Total votes		32,905	100.0%
Republican hold			
Democratic hold			

=== Grand Isle District ===
Grand Isle District election, 2012
Party	Candidate	Votes	%
Democratic	Richard Mazza (incumbent)	8,974	100.0%
Total votes		8,974	100.0%
Democratic hold			

=== Lamoille District ===
Lamoille District election, 2012
Party	Candidate	Votes	%
Republican	Richard A. Westman (incumbent)	6,026	56.60%
Democratic	Jerry Colby	4,609	43.40%
Total votes		10,635	100.0%
Republican hold			

=== Orange District ===
Orange District election, 2012
Party	Candidate	Votes	%
Democratic	Mark MacDonald (incumbent)	7,618	100.0%
Total votes		7,618	100.0%
Democratic hold			

=== Rutland District ===
Rutland District election, 2012
Party	Candidate	Votes	%
Democratic	Bill Carris (incumbent)	17,086	34.40%
Republican	Kevin J. Mullin (incumbent)	16,606	33.50%
Republican	Margaret Flory (incumbent)	15,936	32.10%
Total votes		7,618	100.0%
Democratic hold			
Republican hold			
Republican hold			

=== Washington District ===
Washington District election, 2012
Party	Candidate	Votes	%
Republican	William T. Doyle (incumbent)	17,179	25.40%
Democratic	Ann Cummings (incumbent)	16,557	24.40%
Progressive	Anthony Pollina (incumbent)	14,730	21.70%
Republican	Bernard Barnett	8,913	13.20%
Republican	Dexter LeFavour	6,156	9.10%
Independent	Jeremy Hansen	4,097	6.20%
Total votes		67,738	100.0%
Republican hold			
Democratic hold			
Progressive hold			

=== Windham District ===
Windham District election, 2012
Party	Candidate	Votes	%
Democratic	Jeanette White (incumbent)	13,123	47.40%
Democratic	Peter Galbraith (incumbent)	12,339	44.60%
Liberty Union	Jeremy Hansen	2,214	8.00%
Total votes		27,676	100.0%
Democratic hold			
Democratic hold			

=== Windsor District ===
Windsor District election, 2012
Party	Candidate	Votes	%
Democratic	John F. Campbell (incumbent)	16,249	23.40%
Democratic	Richard McCormack (incumbent)	15,217	21.80%
Democratic	Alice Nitka (incumbent)	14,899	21.30%
Republican	Dick Tracy	9,617	13.80%
Republican	Jeff Whittemore	7,162	10.30%
Republican	Paul Gibbs Jr.	6,651	9.50%
Total votes		69,795	100.0%
Democratic hold			
Democratic hold			
Democratic hold			
