= Members of the Vermont Senate, 2007–08 session =

The following is a list of the persons serving in the Vermont Senate during the 2007–2008 session:

== Members listed by district ==
=== Addison (2 seats) ===
- Claire D. Ayer, Democrat
- Harold W. Giard, Democrat

=== Bennington (2 seats) ===
- Robert Hartwell, Democrat
- Richard W. Sears, Democrat

=== Caledonia (2 seats) ===
- George R. Coppenrath, Republican
- M. Jane Kitchel, Democrat

=== Chittenden (6 seats) ===
- James C. Condos, Democrat
- Edward S. Flanagan, Democrat
- Virginia V. Lyons, Democrat
- Hinda Miller, Democrat
- Douglas A. Racine, Democrat
- Diane B. Snelling, Republican

=== Essex-Orleans (2 seats) ===
- Vincent Illuzzi, Republican
- Robert A. Starr, Democrat

=== Franklin (2 seats) ===
- Donald E. Collins, Democrat
- Sara Branon Kittell, Democrat

=== Grand Isle (1 Seat) ===
- Richard T. Mazza, Democrat

=== Lamoille (1 Seat) ===
- Susan J. Bartlett, Democrat

=== Orange (1 Seat) ===
- Mark A. MacDonald, Democrat

=== Rutland (3 seats) ===
- Bill Carris, Democrat
- Hull P. Maynard, Jr., Republican
- Kevin J. Mullin, Republican

=== Washington (3 seats) ===
- Ann E. Cummings, Democrat
- William T. Doyle, Republican
- Phillip B. Scott, Republican

=== Windham (2 seats) ===
- Peter Shumlin, Democrat
- Jeanette K. White, Democrat

=== Windsor (3 seats) ===
- John F. Campbell, Democrat
- Dick McCormack, Democrat
- Alice Nitka, Democrat

| Preceded by 2005-2006 | Vermont State Senate; 2007-2008 | Succeeded by 2009-2010 |

== See also ==
- List of Vermont General Assemblies
