= Members of the Vermont Senate, 2005–06 session =

The following is a list of the persons who have served in the Vermont Senate during the 2005-2006 session:

== Members listed by district ==
=== Addison ===
- Claire D. Ayer, Democrat
- Harold W. Giard, Democrat

=== Bennington ===
- Richard W. Sears, Democrat
- Mark I. Shepard, Republican

=== Caledonia ===
- Julius D. Canns, Republican note: died during term, February 20, 2005.
- George R. Coppenrath, Republican appointed by Governor James Douglas on April 12, 2005 to serve out the term of the late Senator Canns.
- M. Jane Kitchel, Democrat

=== Chittenden ===
- James C. Condos, Democrat
- Edward S. Flanagan, Democrat
- James P. Leddy, Democrat
- Virginia V. Lyons, Democrat
- Hinda Miller, Democrat
- Diane B. Snelling, Republican

=== Essex-Orleans ===
- Vincent Illuzzi, Republican
- Robert A. Starr, Democrat

=== Franklin ===
- Donald E. Collins, Democrat
- Sara Branon Kittell, Democrat

=== Grand Isle ===
- Richard T. Mazza, Democrat

=== Lamoille ===
- Susan J. Bartlett, Democrat

=== Orange ===
- Mark A. MacDonald, Democrat

=== Rutland ===
- Hull P. Maynard, Jr., Republican
- Kevin J. Mullin, Republican
- Wendy L. Wilton, Republican

=== Washington ===
- Ann E. Cummings, Democrat
- William T. Doyle, Republican
- Phillip B. Scott, Republican

=== Windham ===
- Roderick M. Gander, Democrat
- Jeanette K. White, Democrat

=== Windsor ===
- John Y. Campbell, Democrat
- Matt Dunne, Democrat
- Peter F. Welch, Democrat

== See also ==
- Members of the Vermont House of Representatives, 2005-2006 session
- List of Vermont General Assemblies

Preceded by 2003-2004	Vermont State Senate; 2005-2006	Succeeded by 2007-2008
