= 2014 Vermont Senate election =

- November 4, 2014

All 30 seats in the Vermont Senate 15 (plus the Lt. Gov.) seats needed for a majority

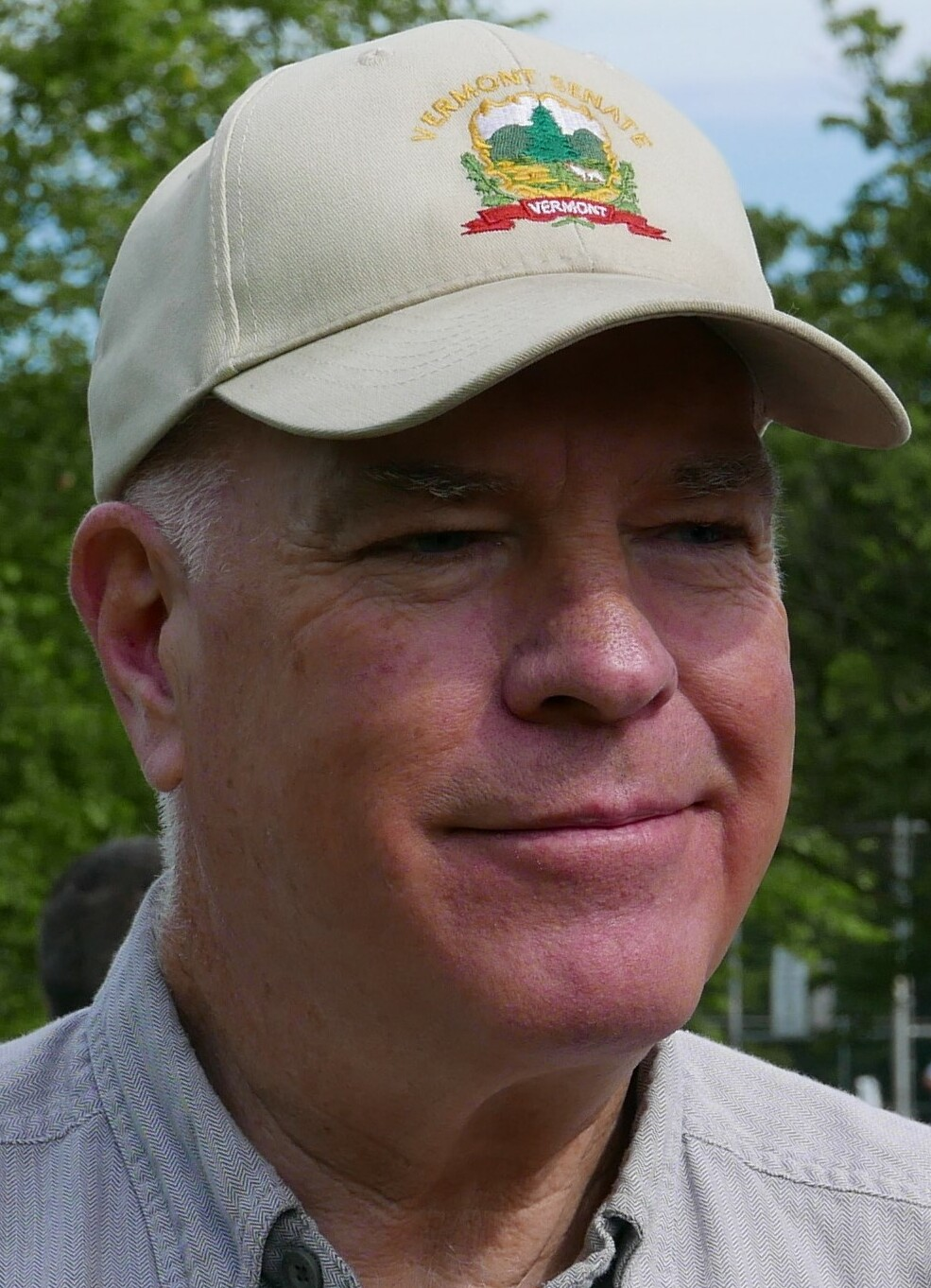

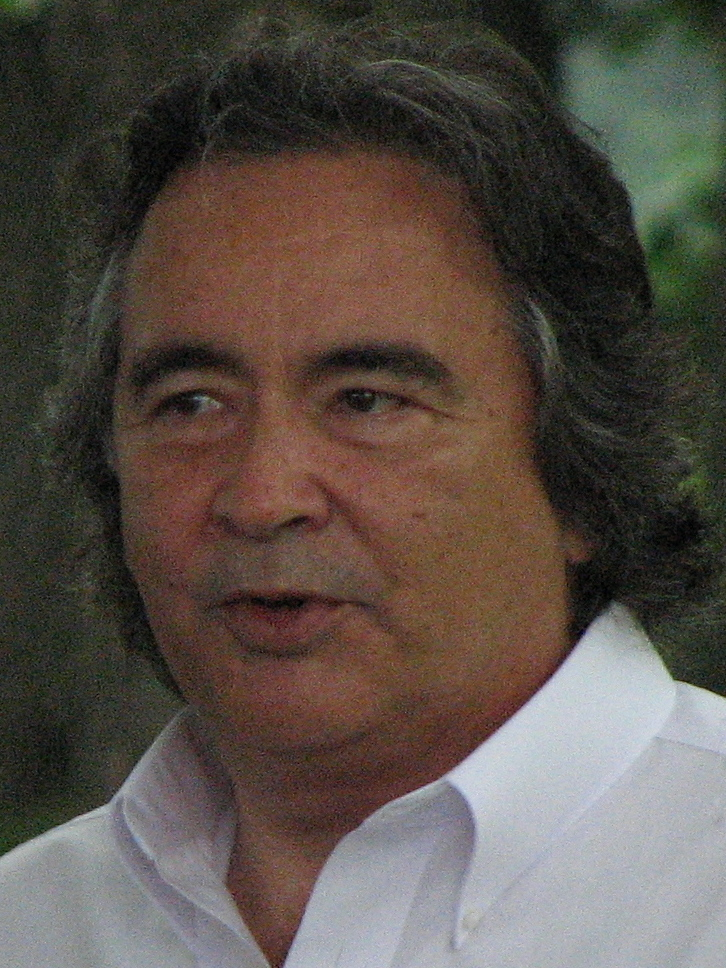
	Majority party	Minority party	Third party
Leader	John Campbell	Joe Benning	Anthony Pollina
Party	Democratic	Republican	Progressive
Leader since	January 5, 2011	January 9, 2013	2013
Leader's seat	Windsor	Franklin	Washington
Last election	21	7	2
Seats won	19 (Note: Not counting Progressive and Republican candidates who were also nominated by the Democratic Party)	9 (Note: Not counting Democratic candidates who were also nominated by the Republican Party)	2 (Note: Not counting Democratic candidates who were also nominated by the Progressive Party)
Seat change	▼2	▲2	Steady
Popular vote	259,052	129,840	37,242
Percentage	56.99%	28.56%	8.19%
- Results: Republican gain Democratic hold Republican hold Progressive hold
President pro tempore before election
John Campbell
Democratic
Elected President pro tempore
John Campbell
Democratic

The 2014 Vermont Senate election took place as part of the biennial United States elections. Vermont voters elected State Senators in all 30 seats. State senators serve two-year terms in the Vermont Senate. The election coincided with elections for other offices including the U.S. House, Governor, and State House. A primary election held on August 26, 2014, determined which candidates appeared on the November 4 general election ballot.

Following the 2012 Senate elections, Democrats maintained control of the Senate with 23 members in the majority caucus (21 Democrats and 2 Progressives). To claim control of the chamber from Democrats, the Republicans would have needed to net gain 8 or 9 seats depending on the winner of the 2014 Vermont lieutenant gubernatorial election, which was Republican Phil Scott. The Republicans gained 2 seats from the Democrats.

== Predictions ==
Source	Ranking	As of
Governing	Safe D	October 20, 2014

== Results Summary ==
State Senate District	Incumbent	Party	Elected Senator	Party
Addison	Claire Ayer	Dem	Claire Ayer	Dem
Addison	Christopher Bray	Dem	Christopher Bray	Dem
Bennington	Dick Sears	Dem	Dick Sears	Dem
Bennington	Robert Hartwell	Dem	Brian Campion	Dem
Caledonia	Jane Kitchel	Dem/Rep	Jane Kitchel	Dem/Rep
Caledonia	Joe Benning	Rep/Dem	Joe Benning	Rep/Dem
Chittenden	Ginny Lyons	Dem	Ginny Lyons	Dem
Chittenden	Tim Ashe	Dem/Prog	Tim Ashe	Dem/Prog
Chittenden	Phil Baruth	Dem	Phil Baruth	Dem
Chittenden	Diane Snelling	Rep	Diane Snelling	Rep
Chittenden	David Zuckerman	Prog/Dem	David Zuckerman	Prog/Dem
Chittenden	Michael Sirotkin	Dem	Michael Sirotkin	Dem
Essex-Orleans	Robert Starr	Dem/Rep	Robert Starr	Dem/Rep
Essex-Orleans	John Rodgers	Dem	John Rodgers	Dem
Franklin	Donald Collins	Dem	Dustin Degree	Rep
Franklin	Norm McAllister	Rep	Norm McAllister	Rep
Grand Isle	Richard Mazza	Dem/Rep	Richard Mazza	Dem/Rep
Lamoille	Richard Westman	Rep/Dem	Richard Westman	Rep/Dem
Orange	Mark MacDonald	Dem	Mark MacDonald	Dem
Rutland	Peg Flory	Rep	Peg Flory	Rep
Rutland	Kevin Mullin	Rep	Kevin Mullin	Rep
Rutland	Eldred French	Dem	Brian Collamore	Rep
Washington	Bill Doyle	Rep	Bill Doyle	Rep
Washington	Ann Cummings	Dem	Ann Cummings	Dem
Washington	Anthony Pollina	Prog/Dem	Anthony Pollina	Prog/Dem
Windham	Jeanette White	Dem	Jeanette White	Dem
Windham	Peter Galbraith	Dem	Becca Balint	Dem
Windsor	John Campbell	Dem	John Campbell	Dem
Windsor	Richard McCormack	Dem/Prog	Richard McCormack	Dem/Prog
Windsor	Alice Nitka	Dem	Alice Nitka	Dem

Party	Candi- dates	Votes		Seats		
Party	Candi- dates	No.	%	No.	+/–	%
Democratic	26	259,052	56.990	19	▼2	63.33
Republican	15	129,840	28.564	9	▲2	30.00
Progressive	3	37,242	8.193	2	Steady	6.67
Libertarian	6	21,124	4.647	0	Steady	0.00
Independent	3	4,324	0.951	0	Steady	0.00
Liberty Union	3	2,640	0.581	0	Steady	0.00
Write-in		338	0.074	0	Steady	0.00
Total	56	454,560	100	30	Steady	100

Senate seats
Democratic	63.33%
Republican	30.00%
Progressive	6.67%

Popular vote
Democratic	56.990%
Republican	28.564%
Progressive	8.193%
Libertarian	4.647%
Independent	0.951%
Liberty Union	0.581%
Write-in	0.074%

=== Incumbents defeated in the general election ===
- Eldred French (D-Rutland), defeated by Brian Collamore (R)

=== Open seats that changed parties ===
- Donald Collins (D-Franklin) didn't seek re-election, seat won by Dustin Degree (R)

== Detailed results ==
=== Addison ===
- Elects 2 senators.

Incumbent Democrats Claire Ayer, who has represented the Addison district since 2003, and Christopher Bray, who has represented the Addison district since 2013, were re-elected.

Vermont Senate Addison district general election, 2014
Party	Candidate	Votes	%
Democratic	Claire Ayer (incumbent)	10,097	53.50%
Democratic	Christopher Bray (incumbent)	8,743	46.32%
Write-in		34	0.18%
Total votes		18,874	100%
Democratic hold			
Democratic hold			

=== Bennington ===
- Elects 2 senators.

Incumbent Democrats Dick Sears, who has represented the Bennington district since 1993, was re-elected. Incumbent Democrat Robert Hartwell, who has represented the Bennington district since 2007, retired. Fellow Democrat Brian Campion won the open seat.

Vermont Senate Bennington district general election, 2014
Party	Candidate	Votes	%
Democratic	Dick Sears (incumbent)	7,905	42.96%
Democratic	Brian Campion	6,273	34.09%
Republican	Warren H. Roaf	4,217	22.92%
Write-in		4	0.02%
Total votes		18,399	100%
Democratic hold			
Democratic hold			

=== Caledonia ===
Incumbent Democrat Jane Kitchel, who has represented the Caledonia district since 2005, and incumbent Republican Minority Leader Joe Benning, who has represented the Caledonia district since 2011, were both re-elected.

- Elects 2 senators.

Vermont Senate Caledonia district general election, 2014
Party	Candidate	Votes	%
Democratic	Jane Kitchel (incumbent) (Note: Running as "Democratic/Republican")	7,786	44.94%
Republican	Joe Benning (incumbent)	6,149	35.49%
Democratic	Mike Heath	3,390	19.57%
Total votes		17,325	100%
Democratic hold			
Republican hold			

=== Chittenden ===
- Elects 6 senators.

Incumbent Democrats Ginny Lyons, who has represented the Chittenden district since 2001, Tim Ashe, who has represented the Chittenden district since 2009, Phil Baruth, who has represented the Chittenden district since 2011, and Michael Sirotkin, who has represented the Chittenden district since 2014, were all re-elected. Progressive David Zuckerman, who has represented the Chittenden district since 2013, and Incumbent Republican Diane Snelling, who has represented the Chittenden district since 2003, were also re-elected.

Vermont Senate Chittenden district general election, 2014
Party	Candidate	Votes	%
Democratic	Ginny Lyons (incumbent)	23,488	12.57%
Democratic	Tim Ashe (incumbent)	22,790	12.20%
Democratic	Phil Baruth (incumbent)	22,217	11.89%
Republican	Diane Snelling (incumbent)	21,855	11.70%
Progressive	David Zuckerman (incumbent)	21,360	11.43%
Democratic	Michael Sirotkin (incumbent)	19,738	10.56%
Democratic	Dawn Ellis	18,432	9.86%
Republican	Joy Limoge	15,853	8.48%
Libertarian	Paul Washburn	4,113	2.20%
Libertarian	John Cisar	3,896	2.09%
Libertarian	Christopher Coolidge	3,694	1.98%
Libertarian	Travis Spencer	3,405	1.82%
Libertarian	Ben Mayer	3,310	1.77%
Libertarian	Glyn Wilkinson	2,706	1.45%
Total votes		186,857	100%
Democratic hold			
Democratic hold			
Democratic hold			
Republican hold			
Progressive hold			
Democratic hold			

=== Essex-Orleans ===
- Elects 2 senators.

Incumbent Democrats Robert Starr, who has represented the Essex-Orleans district since 2005, and John Rodgers, who has represented the Essex-Orleans district since 2013, were both re-elected.

Vermont Senate Essex-Orleans district general election, 2014
Party	Candidate	Votes	%
Democratic	Robert Starr (incumbent)	7,168	43.21%
Democratic	John Rodgers (incumbent)	5,717	34.46%
Republican	Marcia Horne	3,703	22.32%
Total votes		16,588	100%
Democratic hold			
Democratic hold			

=== Franklin ===
- Elects 2 senators.

Incumbent Republican Norm McAllister, who has represented the Franklin district since 2013, was re-elected. Incumbent Democrat Donald Collins, who has represented the Franklin district since 2013, retired. Republican Dustin Degree won the open seat.

Vermont Senate Franklin district general election, 2014
Party	Candidate	Votes	%
Republican	Dustin Degree	6,862	29.65%
Republican	Norm McAllister (incumbent)	6,554	28.32%
Democratic	Sara Brannon Kittell	4,972	21.49%
Democratic	William Alan Roberts	3,925	16.96%
Independent	Michael D. Malone	823	3.56%
Write-in		5	0.02%
Total votes		23,141	100%
Republican gain from Democratic			
Republican hold			

=== Grand Isle ===
- Elects 1 senator.

Incumbent Democrat Richard Mazza, who has represented the Grand Isle district since 1985, was re-elected.

Vermont Senate Grand Isle district general election, 2014
Party	Candidate	Votes	%
Democratic	Richard Mazza (incumbent)	5,603	86.05%
Liberty Union	Benjamin Bosley	908	13.95%
Total votes		6,511	100%
Democratic hold			

=== Lamoille ===
- Elects 1 senator.

Incumbent Republican Richard Westman, who has represented the Lamoille district since 2011, was re-elected.

Vermont Senate Lamoille district general election, 2014
Party	Candidate	Votes	%
Republican	Richard Westman (incumbent)	6,198	99.03%
Write-in		61	0.97%
Total votes		6,259	100%
Republican hold			

=== Orange ===
- Elects 1 senator.

Incumbent Democrat Mark MacDonald, who has represented the Orange district since 2003, was re-elected.

Vermont Senate Orange district general election, 2014
Party	Candidate	Votes	%
Democratic	Mark MacDonald (incumbent)	3,797	54.22%
Republican	Robert C. Frenier	3,200	45.69%
Write-in		6	0.09%
Total votes		7,003	100%
Democratic hold			

=== Rutland ===
- Elects 3 senators.

Incumbent Republicans Peg Flory, who has represented the Rutland district since 2011, and Kevin Mullin, who has represented the Rutland district since 2003, were both re-elected. Incumbent Democrat Eldred French, who has represented the Rutland district since 2013, lost re-election to Republican Brian Collamore won the open seat.

Vermont Senate Rutland district general election, 2014
Party	Candidate	Votes	%
Republican	Peg Flory (incumbent)	10,213	21.25%
Republican	Kevin Mullin (incumbent)	9,932	20.67%
Republican	Brian Collamore	9,275	19.30%
Democratic	William Tracy Carris	7,362	15.32%
Democratic	Eldred French (incumbent)	5,651	11.76%
Democratic	Anissa Delauri	4,091	8.51%
Independent	Kelly Socia	1,528	3.18%
Write-in		2	0.004%
Total votes		48,054	100%
Republican hold			
Republican hold			
Republican gain from Democratic			

=== Washington ===
- Elects 3 senators.

Incumbent Republican Bill Doyle, who has represented the Washington district since 1969, incumbent Democrat Ann Cummings, who has represented the Washington district since 1997, and incumbent Progressive Minority Leader Anthony Pollina, who has represented the Washington district since 2011, were all re-elected.

Vermont Senate Washington district general election, 2014
Party	Candidate	Votes	%
Republican	Bill Doyle (incumbent)	11,275	21.32%
Democratic	Ann Cummings (incumbent)	11,167	21.12%
Progressive	Anthony Pollina (incumbent) (Note: Running as "Progressive/Democratic")	10,474	19.81%
Republican	Pat McDonald	8,731	16.51%
Republican	Dexter Lefavour	5,823	11.01%
Progressive	Sandra Gaffney	5,408	10.23%
Write-in		7	0.01%
Total votes		52,885	100%
Republican hold			
Democratic hold			
Progressive hold			

=== Windham ===
- Elects 2 senators.

Incumbent Democrat Jeanette White, who has represented the Windham district since 2003, was re-elected. Incumbent Democrat Peter Galbraith, who has represented the Windham district since 2011, retired. Fellow Democrat Becca Balint won the open seat.

Vermont Senate Windham district Democratic primary election, 2014
Party	Candidate	Votes	%
Democratic	Jeanette White (incumbent)	2,260	40.06%
Democratic	Becca Balint	1,684	29.85%
Democratic	Roger Allbee	1,240	21.98%
Democratic	Joan Bowman	446	7.91%
Write-in		11	0.20%
Total votes		5,641	100%

Vermont Senate Windham district general election, 2014
Party	Candidate	Votes	%
Democratic	Jeanette White (incumbent)	7,777	43.44%
Democratic	Becca Balint	6,378	35.63%
Independent	Mary Hasson	1,973	11.02%
Liberty Union	Jerry Levy	899	5.02%
Liberty Union	Aaron Diamondstone	833	4.65%
Write-in		41	0.23%
Total votes		17,901	100%
Democratic hold			
Democratic hold			

=== Windsor ===
- Elects 3 senators.

Incumbent Democrats Alice Nitka, who has represented the Windsor district since 2007, and Richard McCormack, who has represented the Windsor district since 2007, and Senate President pro tempore John Campbell, who has represented the Windsor district since 2001, were re-elected.

Vermont Senate Windsor district general election, 2014
Party	Candidate	Votes	%
Democratic	John Campbell (incumbent)	11,667	33.56%
Democratic	Richard McCormack (incumbent) (Note: Running as "Democratic/Progressive")	11,511	33.11%
Democratic	Alice Nitka (incumbent)	11,407	32.81%
Write-in		178	0.51%
Total votes		34,763	100%
Democratic hold			
Democratic hold			
Democratic hold			

== See also ==
- 2014 United States elections
- 2014 Vermont elections
- 2014 United States House of Representatives election in Vermont
- 2014 Vermont gubernatorial election
- 2014 Vermont House of Representatives election
