= 2016 Vermont Senate election =

- November 8, 2016

All 30 seats in the Vermont Senate 15 (plus the Lt. Gov.) seats needed for a majority

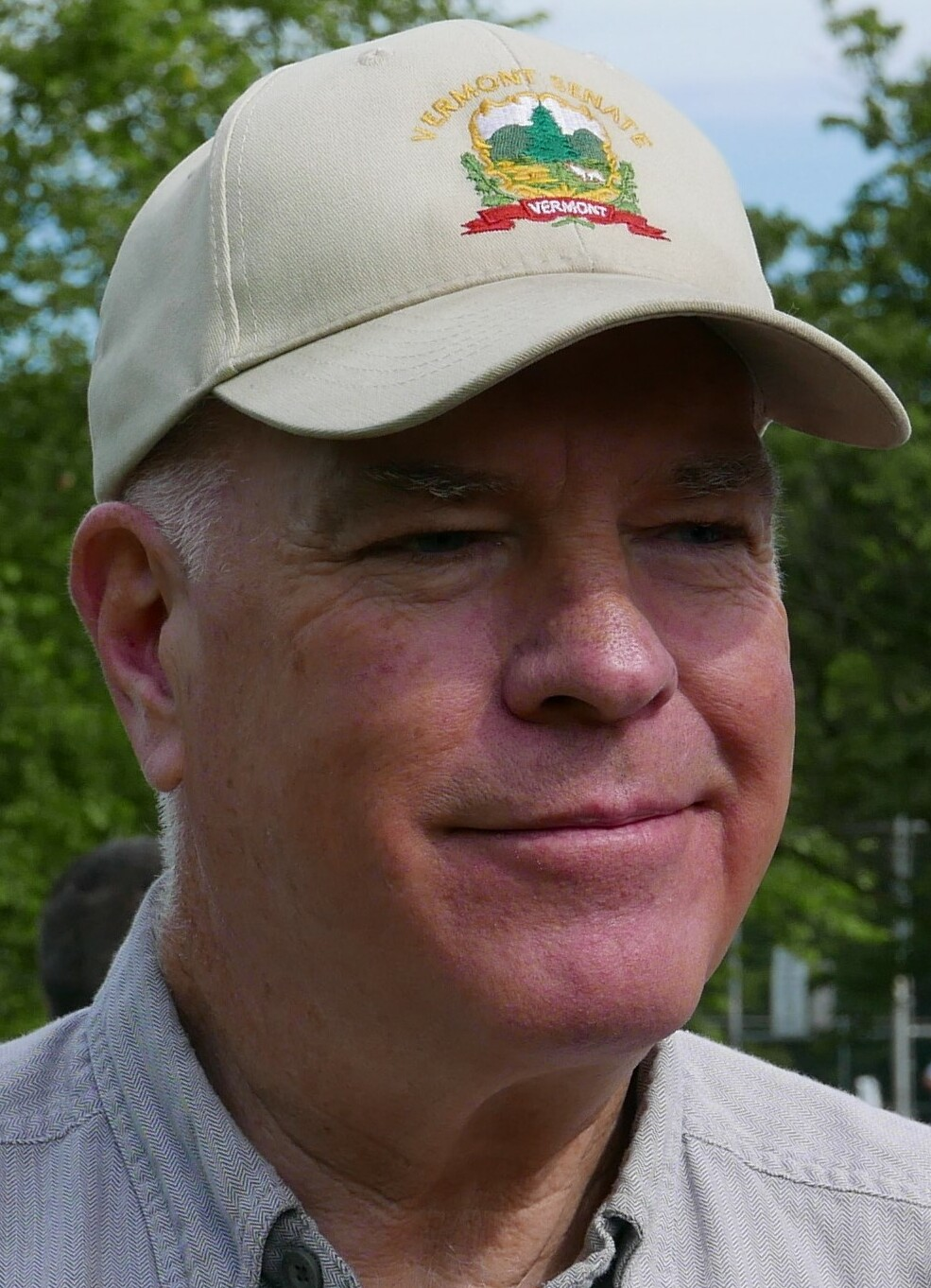

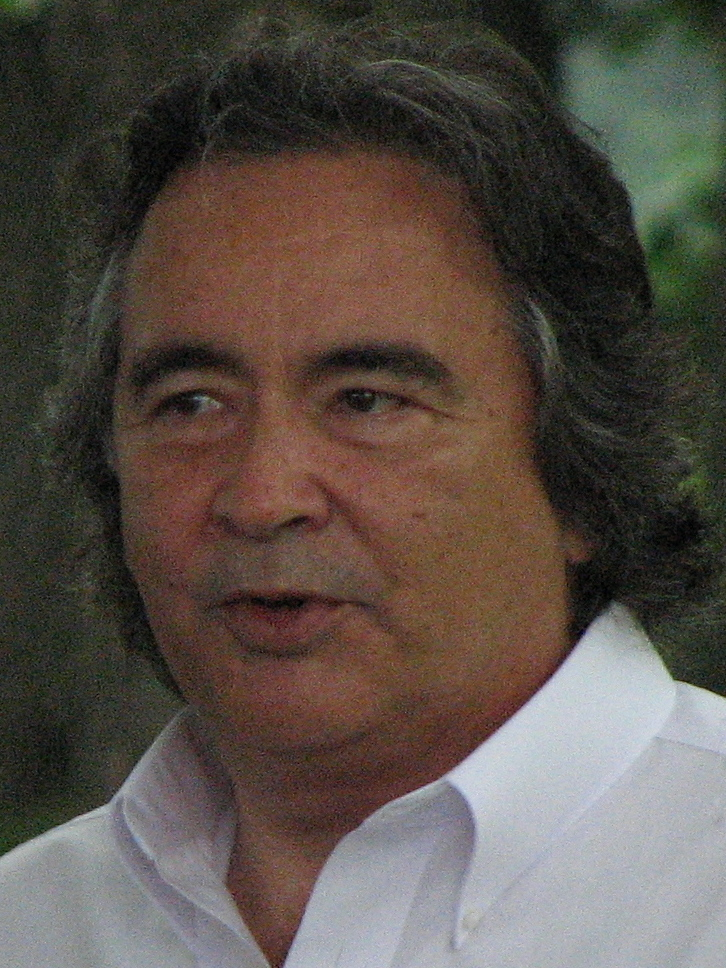
	Majority party	Minority party	Third party
Leader	John Campbell (retired)	Joe Benning	Anthony Pollina
Party	Democratic	Republican	Progressive
Leader since	January 5, 2011	January 9, 2013	2013
Leader's seat	Windsor	Franklin	Washington
Last election	19	9	2
Seats won	21 (Note: Not counting Progressive and Republican candidates who were also nominated by the Democratic Party)	7 (Note: Not counting Democratic candidates who were also nominated by the Republican Party)	2 (Note: Not counting Democratic candidates who were also nominated by the Progressive Party)
Seat change	▲2	▼2	Steady
Popular vote	436,878	188,047	46,404
Percentage	61.65%	26.53%	6.55%
- Results: Democratic gain Democratic hold Republican hold Progressive hold
President pro tempore before election
John Campbell
Democratic
Elected President pro tempore
Tim Ashe
Democratic/Progressive

The 2016 Vermont Senate election took place as part of the biennial United States elections. Vermont voters elected State Senators in all 30 seats. State senators serve two-year terms in the Vermont Senate. The election coincided with elections for other offices including the Presidency, U.S. Senate, U.S. House, Governor, and State House. A primary election held on August 9, 2016 determined which candidates appeared on the November 6 general election ballot.

Following the 2014 Senate elections, Democrats maintained control of the Senate with 21 members in the majority caucus (19 Democrats and two Progressives). To claim control of the chamber from Democrats, the Republicans would have needed to net gain six or seven seats depending on the winner of the 2016 Vermont lieutenant gubernatorial election, which was Progressive Dave Zuckerman. However, in these elections, the Democrats instead gained two seats from the Republicans. After these elections, Joe Benning stepped down as Minority Leader and was succeeded by Dustin Degree. Tim Ashe was elected as the new President pro tempore to succeed John Campbell, who had retired.

== Results ==
State Senate district	Incumbent	Party	Elected Senator	Party
Addison	Claire Ayer	Dem	Claire Ayer	Dem
Addison	Christopher Bray	Dem	Christopher Bray	Dem
Bennington	Dick Sears	Dem	Dick Sears	Dem
Bennington	Brian Campion	Dem	Brian Campion	Dem
Caledonia	Jane Kitchel	Dem/Rep	Jane Kitchel	Dem/Rep
Caledonia	Joe Benning	Rep/Dem	Joe Benning	Rep/Dem
Chittenden	Tim Ashe	Dem/Prog	Tim Ashe	Dem/Prog
Chittenden	Ginny Lyons	Dem	Ginny Lyons	Dem
Chittenden	Helen Riehle	Rep	Debbie Ingram	Dem
Chittenden	Michael Sirotkin	Dem	Michael Sirotkin	Dem
Chittenden	Phil Baruth	Dem/Prog	Phil Baruth	Dem/Prog
Chittenden	David Zuckerman	Prog/Dem	Christopher Pearson	Prog/Dem
Essex-Orleans	Robert Starr	Dem/Rep	Robert Starr	Dem/Rep
Essex-Orleans	John Rodgers	Dem	John Rodgers	Dem
Franklin	Dustin Degree	Rep	Dustin Degree	Rep
Franklin	Norm McAllister	Rep	Carolyn Whitney Branagan	Rep
Grand Isle	Richard Mazza	Dem/Rep	Richard Mazza	Dem/Rep
Lamoille	Richard Westman	Rep	Richard Westman	Rep
Orange	Mark MacDonald	Dem	Mark MacDonald	Dem
Rutland	Peg Flory	Rep	Peg Flory	Rep
Rutland	Kevin Mullin	Rep	Kevin Mullin	Rep
Rutland	Brian Collamore	Rep	Brian Collamore	Rep
Washington	Ann Cummings	Dem	Ann Cummings	Dem
Washington	Anthony Pollina	Prog/Dem	Anthony Pollina	Prog/Dem
Washington	Bill Doyle	Rep	Francis Brooks	Dem
Windham	Jeanette White	Dem	Jeanette White	Dem
Windham	Becca Balint	Dem	Becca Balint	Dem
Windsor	John Campbell	Dem	Alison Clarkson	Dem
Windsor	Alice Nitka	Dem	Alice Nitka	Dem
Windsor	Richard McCormack	Dem/Prog	Richard McCormack	Dem/Prog

== Results summary ==
Party	Candi- dates	Votes		Seats		
Party	Candi- dates	No.	%	No.	+/–	%
Democratic	27	436,878	61.646	21	▲2	70.00
Republican	19	188,047	26.534	7	▼2	23.33
Progressive	2	46,404	6.548	2	Steady	6.67
Independent	4	29,896	4.219	0	Steady	0.00
Liberty Union	2	2,966	0.419	0	Steady	0.00
Marijuana	1	2,443	0.345	0	Steady	0.00
Write-in		2,051	0.289	0	Steady	0.00
Total	55	708,685	100	30	Steady	100

Senate seats
Democratic	70.00%
Republican	23.33%
Progressive	6.67%

Popular vote
Democratic	61.646%
Republican	26.534%
Progressive	6.548%
Independent	4.219%
Liberty Union	0.419%
Marijuana	0.345%
Write-in	0.289%

=== Incumbents defeated in the primary election ===
- Norm McAllister (R-Franklin), defeated by Carolyn Whitney Branagan (R)

=== Incumbents defeated in the general election ===
- Bill Doyle (R-Washington), defeated by Francis Brooks (D)

=== Open seats that changed parties ===
- Helen Riehle (R-Chittenden) did not seek re-election, seat won by Debbie Ingram (D)

== Predictions ==
Source	Ranking	As of
Governing	Safe D	October 12, 2016

== Detailed results ==
=== Addison ===
- Elects 2 senators.

Incumbent Democrats Claire Ayer, who had represented the Addison district since 2003, and Christopher Bray, who had represented the Addison district since 2013, were re-elected.

Vermont Senate Addison district general election, 2016
Party	Candidate	Votes	%
Democratic	Claire Ayer (incumbent)	11,988	29.03%
Democratic	Christopher Bray (incumbent)	9,545	23.12%
Republican	Peter Briggs	7,330	17.75%
Republican	Lynn Dike	5,963	5,963
N/A	Blanks	6,425	15.56%
N/A	Write-ins	26	0.06%
N/A	Overvotes	12	0.03%
Total votes		41,289	100%
Democratic hold			
Democratic hold			

=== Bennington ===
- Elects 2 senators.

Incumbent Democrats Dick Sears, who had represented the Bennington district since 1993, and Brian Campion, who had represented the Bennington district since 2015, were both re-elected.

Vermont Senate Bennington district general election, 2016
Party	Candidate	Votes	%
Democratic	Dick Sears (incumbent)	13,333	35.43%
Democratic	Brian Campion (incumbent)	11,507	30.58%
N/A	Blanks	12,526	33.29%
N/A	Write-ins	238	0.63%
N/A	Overvotes	28	0.07%
Total votes		37,632	100%
Democratic hold			
Democratic hold			

=== Caledonia ===
Incumbent Democrat Jane Kitchel, who had represented the Caledonia district since 2005, and incumbent Republican Minority Leader Joe Benning, who had represented the Caledonia district since 2011, were both re-elected.

- Elects 2 senators.

Vermont Senate Caledonia district election, 2016
Party	Candidate	Votes	%
Democratic	Jane Kitchel (incumbent) (Note: Running as "Democratic/Republican")	12,383	33.11%
Republican	Joe Benning (incumbent) (Note: Running as "Republican/Democratic")	10,908	29.17%
Marijuana	Galen Dively III	2,443	6.53%
N/A	Blanks	11,538	30.86%
N/A	Write-ins	108	0.29%
N/A	Overvotes	14	0.04%
Total votes		37,394	100%
Democratic hold			
Republican hold			

=== Chittenden ===
- Elects 6 senators.

Incumbent Democrats Tim Ashe, who had represented the Chittenden district since 2009, Ginny Lyons, who had represented the Chittenden district since 2001, Michael Sirotkin, who had represented the Chittenden district since 2014, and Phil Baruth, who had represented the Chittenden district since 2011, were all re-elected. Incumbent Progressive David Zuckerman, who had represented the Chittenden district since 2013, retired to run for lieutenant governor. Incumbent Republican Helen Riehle, who had represented the Chittenden district since 2016, did not seek re-election. Progressive Christopher Pearson and Democrat Debbie Ingram won the open seats.

Vermont Senate Chittenden district Democratic primary election, 2016
Party	Candidate	Votes	%
Democratic	Tim Ashe (incumbent)	13,175	11.26%
Democratic	Ginny Lyons (incumbent)	12,185	10.41%
Democratic	Michael Sirotkin (incumbent)	10,471	8.95%
Democratic	Phil Baruth (incumbent)	9,238	7.89%
Democratic	Christopher Pearson	8,325	7.11%
Democratic	Debbie Ingram	7,386	6.31%
Democratic	David Scherr	7,009	5.99%
Democratic	Faisal Gill	6,645	5.68%
Democratic	Dawn Ellis	6,488	5.54%
Democratic	Nick Cook	2,830	2.42%
Democratic	Louis Meyers	2,384	2.04%
N/A	Blanks	30,668	26.21%
N/A	Write-ins	153	0.13%
N/A	Overvotes	73	0.06%
Total votes		117,030	100%

Vermont Senate Chittenden district general election, 2016
Party	Candidate	Votes	%
Democratic	Tim Ashe (incumbent) (Note: Running as "Democratic/Progressive")	44,297	9.78%
Democratic	Ginny Lyons (incumbent)	41,223	9.10%
Democratic	Debbie Ingram	40,467	8.93%
Democratic	Michael Sirotkin (incumbent)	37,585	8.30%
Democratic	Phil Baruth (incumbent)	37,453	8.27%
Progressive	Christopher Pearson (Note: Running as "Progressive/Democratic")	31,192	6.89%
Republican	John C. Gifford	25,346	5.59%
Independent	Tom Licata	17,021	3.76%
N/A	Blanks	177,242	39.12%
N/A	Write-ins	818	0.18%
N/A	Overvotes	386	0.09%
Total votes		453,030	100%
Democratic hold			
Democratic hold			
Democratic gain from Republican			
Democratic hold			
Democratic hold			
Progressive hold			

=== Essex-Orleans ===
- Elects 2 senators.

Incumbent Democrats Robert Starr, who had represented the Essex-Orleans district since 2005, and John Rodgers, who had represented the Essex-Orleans district since 2013, were both re-elected.

Vermont Senate Essex-Orleans district Democratic primary election, 2016
Party	Candidate	Votes	%
Democratic	Robert Starr (incumbent)	1,643	29.46%
Democratic	John Rodgers (incumbent)	1,634	29.29%
Democratic	Ron Horton	712	12.76%
N/A	Blanks	1,557	27.91%
N/A	Write-ins	31	0.56%
N/A	Overvotes	1	0.02%
Total votes		5,578	100%

Vermont Senate Essex-Orleans district general election, 2016
Party	Candidate	Votes	%
Democratic	Robert Starr (incumbent)	9,381	26.72%
Democratic	John Rodgers (incumbent)	8,601	24.50%
Republican	Marcia Horne	5,199	14.81%
Republican	Eric O. Collins	4,637	13.21%
N/A	Blanks	7,182	20.46%
N/A	Write-ins	54	0.15%
N/A	Overvotes	48	0.14%
Total votes		35,102	100%
Democratic hold			
Democratic hold			

=== Franklin ===
- Elects 2 senators.

Incumbent Republican Dustin Degree, who had represented the Franklin district since 2015, was re-elected. Incumbent Republican Norm McAllister, who had represented the Franklin district since 2013, lost re-nomination to fellow Republican Carolyn Whitney Branagan. Branagan won the open seat.

Vermont Senate Franklin district Republican primary election, 2016
Party	Candidate	Votes	%
Republican	Dustin Degree (incumbent)	2,856	36.66%
Republican	Carolyn Whitney Branagan	2,570	32.99%
Republican	Norm McAllister (incumbent)	814	10.45%
N/A	Blanks	1,309	16.80%
N/A	Write-ins	96	1.23%
N/A	Overvotes	145	1.86%
Total votes		7,790	100%

Vermont Senate Franklin district general election, 2016
Party	Candidate	Votes	%
Republican	Dustin Degree (incumbent)	10,546	24.88%
Republican	Carolyn Whitney Branagan	9,426	22.24%
Democratic	Sara Brannon Kittell	8,537	20.14%
Democratic	Denise Smith	6,213	14.66%
N/A	Blanks	7,596	17.92%
N/A	Write-ins	47	0.11%
N/A	Overvotes	17	0.04%
Total votes		42,382	100%
Republican hold			
Republican hold			

=== Grand Isle ===
- Elects 1 senator.

Incumbent Democrat Richard Mazza, who had represented the Grand Isle district since 1985, was re-elected.

Vermont Senate Grand Isle district general election, 2016
Party	Candidate	Votes	%
Democratic	Richard Mazza (incumbent)	9,771	86.68%
N/A	Blanks	951	8.44%
N/A	Overvotes	469	4.16%
N/A	Write-ins	82	0.73%
Total votes		11,273	100%
Democratic hold			

=== Lamoille ===
- Elects 1 senator.

Incumbent Republican Richard Westman, who had represented the Lamoille district since 2011, was re-elected.

Vermont Senate Lamoille district Democratic primary election, 2016
Party	Candidate	Votes	%
Democratic	George Gay	1,460	53.54%
Democratic	Gerard "Jerry" Colby	837	30.69%
N/A	Blanks	338	12.39%
N/A	Write-ins	92	3.37%
Total votes		2,727	100%

Vermont Senate Lamoille district general election, 2016
Party	Candidate	Votes	%
Republican	Richard Westman (incumbent)	6,219	51.09%
Democratic	George Gay	5,492	45.12%
N/A	Blanks	439	3.61%
N/A	Write-ins	17	0.14%
N/A	Overvotes	6	0.05%
Total votes		12,173	100%
Republican hold			

=== Orange ===
- Elects 1 senator.

Incumbent Democrat Mark MacDonald, who had represented the Orange district since 2003, was re-elected.

Vermont Senate Orange district election, 2016
Party	Candidate	Votes	%
Democratic	Mark MacDonald (incumbent)	5,723	54.00%
Republican	Stephen W. Webster	4,409	41.60%
N/A	Blanks	441	4.16%
N/A	Write-ins	19	0.18%
N/A	Overvotes	7	0.07%
Total votes		10,599	100%
Democratic hold			

=== Rutland ===
- Elects 3 senators.

Incumbent Republicans Peg Flory, who had represented the Rutland district since 2011, Kevin Mullin, who had represented the Rutland district since 2003, and Brian Collamore, who had represented the Rutland district since 2015, were all re-elected.

Vermont Senate Rutland district general election, 2016
Party	Candidate	Votes	%
Republican	Peg Flory (incumbent)	14,782	16.83%
Republican	Kevin Mullin (incumbent)	14,191	16.16%
Republican	Brian Collamore (incumbent)	13,680	15.58%
Democratic	Cheryl Hooker	10,641	12.12%
Democratic	Korrine C. Rodrigue	9,212	10.49%
Democratic	Scott Garren	6,428	7.32%
Independent	Richard Lenchus	2,067	2.35%
N/A	Blanks	16,406	18.68%
N/A	Write-ins	371	0.42%
N/A	Overvotes	38	0.04%
Total votes		87,816	100%
Republican hold			
Republican hold			
Republican hold			

=== Washington ===
- Elects 3 senators.

Incumbent Democrat Ann Cummings, who had represented the Washington district since 1997, and incumbent Progressive Minority Leader Anthony Pollina, who had represented the Washington district since 2011, were both re-elected. Incumbent Republican Bill Doyle, who had represented the Washington district since 1969, lost re-election to Democrat Francis Brooks.

Vermont Senate Washington district Democratic primary election, 2016
Party	Candidate	Votes	%
Democratic	Anthony Pollina (incumbent)	6,083	22.74%
Democratic	Ann Cummings (incumbent)	6,028	22.53%
Democratic	Francis Brooks	3,709	13.86%
Democratic	Ashley A. Hill	3,708	13.86%
N/A	Blanks	7,028	26.27%
N/A	Write-ins	191	0.71%
N/A	Overvotes	7	0.03%
Total votes		26,754	100%

Vermont Senate Washington district general election, 2016
Party	Candidate	Votes	%
Democratic	Ann Cummings (incumbent)	17,013	17.88%
Progressive	Anthony Pollina (incumbent)	15,212	15.98%
Democratic	Francis Brooks	13,689	14.38%
Republican	Bill Doyle (incumbent)	13,498	14.18%
Republican	Michael "Mike" Doyle	8,236	8.65%
Republican	John "Josh" Fitzhugh	8,233	8.65%
N/A	Blanks	19,151	20.12%
N/A	Write-ins	106	0.11%
N/A	Overvotes	37	0.04%
Total votes		95,175	100%
Democratic hold			
Progressive hold			
Democratic gain from Republican			

=== Windham ===
- Elects 2 senators.

Incumbent Democrat Majority Leader Becca Balint, who had represented the Windham district since 2015, and incumbent Democrat Jeanette White, who had represented the Windham district since 2003, were both re-elected.

Vermont Senate Windham district general election, 2016
Party	Candidate	Votes	%
Democratic	Jeanette White (incumbent)	11,451	27.35%
Democratic	Becca Balint (incumbent)	11,174	26.69%
Independent	David Schoales	5,610	13.40%
Liberty Union	Jerry Levy	1,529	3.65%
Liberty Union	Aaron Diamondstone	1,437	3.43%
N/A	Blanks	10,091	24.10%
N/A	Write-ins	78	0.19%
N/A	Overvotes	498	1.19%
Total votes		41,868	100%
Democratic hold			
Democratic hold			

=== Windsor ===
- Elects 3 senators.

Incumbent Democrats Alice Nitka, who had represented the windsor district since 2007, and Richard McCormack, who had represented the Windsor district since 2007, were both re-elected. Incumbent Democratic Senate President pro tempore John Campbell, who had represented the Windsor district since 2001, retired. Fellow Democrat Alison Clarkson won the open seat.

Vermont Senate Windsor district Democratic primary election, 2016
Party	Candidate	Votes	%
Democratic	Richard McCormack (incumbent)	5,381	20.31%
Democratic	Alison Clarkson	5,145	19.42%
Democratic	Alice Nitka (incumbent)	4,448	16.79%
Democratic	Conor Kennedy	3,720	14.04%
N/A	Blanks	7,717	29.13%
N/A	Write-ins	65	0.25%
N/A	Overvotes	14	0.05%
Total votes		26,490	100%

Vermont Senate Windsor district general election, 2016
Party	Candidate	Votes	%
Democratic	Alison Clarkson	15,436	16.04%
Democratic	Alice Nitka (incumbent)	14,430	14.99%
Democratic	Richard McCormack (incumbent)	13,905	14.44%
Republican	Mark Donka	9,836	10.22%
Republican	Randy A. Gray	8,148	8.46%
Republican	Jack Williams	7,460	7.75%
Independent	Scott D. Woodward	5,198	5.40%
N/A	Blanks	21,714	22.56%
N/A	Write-ins	87	0.09%
N/A	Overvotes	50	0.05%
Total votes		96,264	100%
Democratic hold			
Democratic hold			
Democratic hold			

== See also ==
- 2016 United States elections
- 2016 Vermont elections
- 2016 United States presidential election in Vermont
- 2016 United States Senate election in Vermont
- 2016 United States House of Representatives election in Vermont
- 2016 Vermont gubernatorial election
- 2016 Vermont House of Representatives election
