= Julius D. Canns =

American politician (1923–2005)

Julius Daly Canns (February 20, 1923 – February 20, 2005) was a Republican member of the Vermont State Senate, 1993–2005. He represented the Caledonia County Senate District.

Julius Canns was first elected to the Vermont State Senate on November 3, 1992 and served until his death.

== Biography ==
Canns was born in Hartford, Connecticut on February 20, 1923. He attended elementary school in Bloomfield, Connecticut, and then the Haaren Aviation High School, in New York City. He went on to receive a certificate of completion from New York University, training in electronics from Delehanty Institute in 1948, and an LLB from La Salle Extension University in 1965.

He moved to St. Johnsbury, Vermont in 1958, where he operated a television store. He was married to Mary Canns, and had one daughter, Sharon, and two sons, Gary and Ronald.

In World War II he volunteered for the Marine Corps and served in the Pacific, attaining the rank of Gunnery Sergeant.

He died of cancer on February 20, 2005, his 82nd birthday.

== Public life ==
Canns held the following offices:

- St. Johnsbury Grand juror.
- St. Johnsbury Justice of the Peace.
- Member St. Johnsbury select board (serving four years).
- St. Johnsbury tax collector.
- Caledonia County deputy sheriff.
- Member Vermont State Senate. First elected 1992, served until his death (February 20, 2005).

Following Canns' death, Governor James Douglas appointed George R. Coppenrath to serve out the remainder of Canns' term.

== See also ==
- Members of the Vermont Senate, 2005-2006 session
