= George R. Coppenrath =

American politician

George R. Coppenrath was a Republican member of the Vermont State Senate, representing the Caledonia senate district.

George Coppenrath was appointed by Governor James Douglas to the Vermont State Senate on April 12, 2005 to serve out remainder of the term of Senator Julius D. Canns, who had died on February 20, 2005. On November 7, 2006, Coppenrath was elected to a full term in the state Senate.

== Biography ==
Coppenrath served as Chief of the Town of Barnet fire department. He and his wife Sue have three sons, Ethan (age 30), Taylor (age 27), and Drew (age 23). Taylor Coppenrath is a professional basketball player.

== Public life ==
Coppenrath was appointed to the Vermont Senate by Governor Jim Douglas on April 12, 2005 and won election in his own right in November 2006. He announced in early 2008 that he would not seek re-election to a second full term.

== See also ==
- Members of the Vermont Senate, 2005-2006 session
- Members of the Vermont Senate, 2007-2008 session
