= Scott Beck (politician) =

American politician and member of the Vermont State House of Representatives

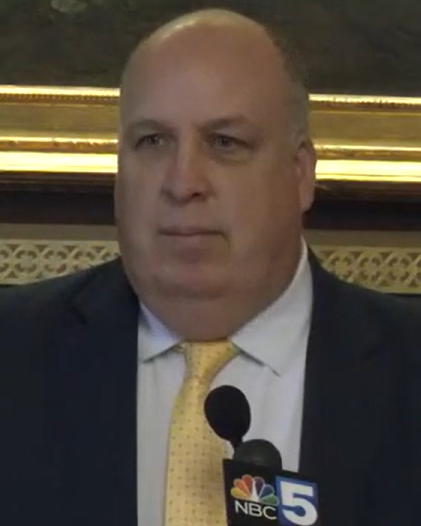
- Beck in 2025

Minority Leader of the Vermont Senate
- Incumbent
- Assumed office January 8, 2025
- Preceded by: Randy Brock

Member of the Vermont Senate from the Caledonia district
- Incumbent
- Assumed office January 8, 2025
- Preceded by: Jane Kitchel

Member of the Vermont House of Representatives from the Caledonia-3 district
- In office January 7, 2015 – January 8, 2025
- Preceded by: Michelle Fay
- Succeeded by: Deborah Dolgin

Personal details
- Born: Scott Lawrence Beck; April 17, 1968 (age 58) St. Johnsbury, Vermont, U.S.
- Party: Republican
- Education: University of Washington (BA in political science); The Citadel (MEd)

Scott Lawrence Beck (born April 17, 1968) is an American politician who has served as minority leader of the Vermont Senate since 2025. A member of the Republican Party, Beck was previously a member of the Vermont House of Representatives from 2015 to 2025, when he was elected to the state senate.

Vermont Senate
| Preceded by Randy Brock | Minority Leader of the Vermont Senate; 2025–present | Incumbent |
