= Daniel B. Ruggles III =

American politician (1924–2022)

Member of the Vermont Senate from the Washington district
- In office 1963–1969
- Succeeded by: William T. Doyle

Personal details
- Born: Daniel Blaisdell Ruggles III; November 28, 1924 Salem, Massachusetts, U.S.
- Died: July 21, 2022 (aged 97) Essex County, Massachusetts, U.S.
- Party: Republican
- Education: Dartmouth College; University of Denver; Babson Institute

Daniel Blaisdell Ruggles III (November 28, 1924 – July 21, 2022) was an American politician. He served as a Republican member of the Vermont Senate.

== Life and career ==
Ruggles was born in Salem, Massachusetts, the son of Daniel Blaisdell Ruggles Jr. and Dorothy Johnson. He attended Dartmouth College, the University of Denver and Babson Institute. He was a Japanese interpreter during World War II.

Ruggles served in the Vermont Senate from 1963 to 1969.

Ruggles died on July 21, 2022 in Essex County, Massachusetts, at the age of 97. He was buried in Harmony Grove Cemetery.
