= Senator Snelling =

Senator Snelling may refer to:

- Barbara Snelling (1928–2015), Vermont State Senate
- Diane B. Snelling (born 1952), Vermont State Senate
