= List of Vermont General Assemblies =

List of Vermont state legislatures

The following is a list of legislative terms of the Vermont General Assembly, the law-making branch of government of the U.S. state of Vermont. Vermont became part of the United States on March 4, 1791.

== Legislatures ==
Name	Start date	End date	Last election
1778 Vermont General Assembly	March 12, 1778		
1779 Vermont General Assembly	1779	1779	
1780 Vermont General Assembly	1780	1780	
1781 Vermont General Assembly	1781	1781	
1782 Vermont General Assembly	1782	1782	
1783 Vermont General Assembly	1783	1783	
1784 Vermont General Assembly	1784	1784	
1785 Vermont General Assembly	1785	1785	
1786 Vermont General Assembly	1786	1786	
1787 Vermont General Assembly	1787	1787	
1788 Vermont General Assembly	1788	1788	
1789 Vermont General Assembly	1789	1789	
1790 Vermont General Assembly	1790	1790	
1791 Vermont General Assembly	1791	1791	
1792 Vermont General Assembly	1792	1792	
1793 Vermont General Assembly	1793	1793	
1794 Vermont General Assembly	1794	1794	
1795 Vermont General Assembly	1795	1795	
1796 Vermont General Assembly	1796	1796	
1797 Vermont General Assembly	1797	1797	
1798 Vermont General Assembly	1798	1798	
1799 Vermont General Assembly	1799	1799	
1800 Vermont General Assembly	1800	1800	
1801 Vermont General Assembly	1801	1801	
1802 Vermont General Assembly	1802	1802	
1803 Vermont General Assembly	1803	1803	
1804 Vermont General Assembly	1804	1804	
1805 Vermont General Assembly	1805	1805	
1806 Vermont General Assembly	1806	1806	
1807 Vermont General Assembly	1807	1807	
1808 Vermont General Assembly	1808	1808	
1809 Vermont General Assembly	1809	1809	
1810 Vermont General Assembly	1810	1810	
1811 Vermont General Assembly	1811	1811	
1812 Vermont General Assembly	1812	1812	
1813 Vermont General Assembly	1813	1813	
1814 Vermont General Assembly	1814	1814	
1815 Vermont General Assembly	1815	1815	
1816 Vermont General Assembly	1816	1816	
1817 Vermont General Assembly	1817	1817	
1818 Vermont General Assembly	1818	1818	
1819 Vermont General Assembly	1819	1819	
1820 Vermont General Assembly	1820	1820	
1821 Vermont General Assembly	1821	1821	
1822 Vermont General Assembly	1822	1822	
1823 Vermont General Assembly	1823	1823	
1824 Vermont General Assembly	1824	1824	
1825 Vermont General Assembly	1825	1825	
1826 Vermont General Assembly	1826	1826	
1827 Vermont General Assembly	1827	1827	
1828 Vermont General Assembly	1828	1828	
1829 Vermont General Assembly	1829	1829	
1830 Vermont General Assembly	1830	1830	
1831 Vermont General Assembly	1831	1831	
1832 Vermont General Assembly	1832	1832	
1833 Vermont General Assembly	1833	1833	
1834 Vermont General Assembly	1834	1834	
1835 Vermont General Assembly	1835	1835	
1836 Vermont General Assembly	1836	1836	
1837 Vermont General Assembly	1837	1837	
1838 Vermont General Assembly	1838	1838	
1839 Vermont General Assembly	1839	1839	
1840 Vermont General Assembly	1840	1840	
1841 Vermont General Assembly	1841	1841	
1842 Vermont General Assembly	1842	1842	
1843 Vermont General Assembly	1843	1843	
1844 Vermont General Assembly	1844	1844	
1845 Vermont General Assembly	1845	1845	
1846 Vermont General Assembly	1846	1846	
1847 Vermont General Assembly	1847	1847	
1848 Vermont General Assembly	1848	1848	
1849 Vermont General Assembly	1849	1849	
1850 Vermont General Assembly	1850	1850	
1851 Vermont General Assembly	1851	1851	
1852 Vermont General Assembly	1852	1852	
1853 Vermont General Assembly	1853	1853	
1854 Vermont General Assembly	1854	1854	
1855 Vermont General Assembly	1855	1855	
1856 Vermont General Assembly	1856	1856	
1857 Vermont General Assembly	1857	1857	
1858 Vermont General Assembly	1858	1858	
1859 Vermont General Assembly	1859	1859	
1860 Vermont General Assembly	1860	1860	
1861 Vermont General Assembly	1861	1861	
1862 Vermont General Assembly	1862	1862	
1863 Vermont General Assembly	1863	1863	
1864 Vermont General Assembly	1864	1864	
1865 Vermont General Assembly	1865	1865	
1866 Vermont General Assembly	1866	1866	
1867 Vermont General Assembly	1867	1867	
1868 Vermont General Assembly	1868	1868	
1869 Vermont General Assembly	1869	1869	
1870 Vermont General Assembly	1870	1870	
1872 Vermont General Assembly	1872	1872	
1874 Vermont General Assembly	1874	1874	
1876 Vermont General Assembly	1876	1876	
1878 Vermont General Assembly	1878	1878	
1880 Vermont General Assembly	1880	1880	
1882 Vermont General Assembly	1882	1882	
1884 Vermont General Assembly	1884	1884	
1886 Vermont General Assembly	1886	1886	
1888 Vermont General Assembly	1888	1888	
1890 Vermont General Assembly	1890	1890	
1892 Vermont General Assembly	1892	1892	
1894 Vermont General Assembly	1894	1894	
1896 Vermont General Assembly	1896	1896	
1898 Vermont General Assembly	1898	1898	
1900 Vermont General Assembly	1900	1900	
1902 Vermont General Assembly	1902	1902	
1904 Vermont General Assembly	1904	1904	
1906 Vermont General Assembly	1906	1906	
1908 Vermont General Assembly	1908	1908	
1910 Vermont General Assembly	1910	1910	
1912 Vermont General Assembly	1912	1912	
1915 Vermont General Assembly	1915	1915	
1917 Vermont General Assembly	1917	1917	
1919 Vermont General Assembly	1919	1919	
1921 Vermont General Assembly	1921	1921	
1923 Vermont General Assembly	1923	1923	
1925 Vermont General Assembly	1925	1925	
1927 Vermont General Assembly	1927	1927	
1929 Vermont General Assembly	1929	1929	
1931 Vermont General Assembly	1931	1931	
1933 Vermont General Assembly	1933	1933	
1935 Vermont General Assembly	1935	1935	
1937 Vermont General Assembly	1937	1937	
1939 Vermont General Assembly	January 4, 1939	April 14, 1939	
1941 Vermont General Assembly	1941	1941	
1943 Vermont General Assembly	1943	1943	
1945 Vermont General Assembly	1945	1945	
1947 Vermont General Assembly	1947	1947	
1949 Vermont General Assembly	1949	1949	
1951 Vermont General Assembly	1951	1951	
1953 Vermont General Assembly	1953	1953	
1955 Vermont General Assembly	1955	1955	
1957 Vermont General Assembly	1957	1957	
1959 Vermont General Assembly	1959	1959	
1961 Vermont General Assembly	1961	1961	
1963 Vermont General Assembly	1963	1963	
1965 Vermont General Assembly	1965	1965	
1967 Vermont General Assembly	1967	1967	
1969-1970 Vermont General Assembly	1969	1970	
1971-1972 Vermont General Assembly	1971	1972	
1973-1974 Vermont General Assembly	1973	1974	
1975-1976 Vermont General Assembly	1975		
1977-1978 Vermont General Assembly	1977	1978	
1979-1980 Vermont General Assembly	1979	1980	
1981-1982 Vermont General Assembly	1981	1982	
1983-1984 Vermont General Assembly	1983	1984	
1985-1986 Vermont General Assembly	1985	1986	
1993-1994 Vermont General Assembly	1993		
1995-1996 Vermont General Assembly	1995		
1997-1998 Vermont General Assembly	1997		
1999-2000 Vermont General Assembly			
2001-2002 Vermont General Assembly			
2003-2004 Vermont General Assembly			
2005-2006 Vermont General Assembly; Members of House, Senate			
2007-2008 Vermont General Assembly; Members of House, Senate			
2009-2010 Vermont General Assembly	2009		
2011-2012 Vermont General Assembly	January 5, 2011	May 5, 2012	
2013-2014 Vermont General Assembly	January 9, 2013		
2015-2016 Vermont General Assembly	January 7, 2015		November 2014: Senate
2017-2018 Vermont General Assembly	January 4, 2017		November 2016: Senate
2019-2020 Vermont General Assembly	January 9, 2019		November 2018: House, Senate
2021-2022 Vermont General Assembly	January 6, 2021		November 2020: House, Senate
2023-2024 Vermont General Assembly	January 4, 2023		November 2022: House, Senate
2025-2026 Vermont General Assembly	2025		November 5, 2024: House, Senate

== See also ==
- List of speakers of the Vermont House of Representatives
- List of presidents pro tempore of the Vermont Senate
- List of governors of Vermont
- Constitution of Vermont
- Politics of Vermont
- Elections in Vermont
- Vermont State Capitol
- Historical outline of Vermont
- Lists of United States state legislative sessions
