= Harold W. Giard =

American politician

Harold W. Giard is a former Democratic member of the Vermont State Senate, representing the Addison senate district.

== Biography ==
Giard grew up in Bridport, Vermont. After graduating from Middlebury Union High School, he attended St. Michael's College.

He is married to Shirley Giard. The couple have one daughter.

Giard is a former dairy farmer.

== Public life ==
Giard was elected to the Vermont House of Representatives in 1972 and continued to serve there until 1980.

He was elected to the Vermont Senate in 2004.

In June 2012 Giard told The Addison Independent that he would not be seeking a fifth term in the Vermont Senate.

== See also ==
- Members of the Vermont Senate, 2005-2006 session
- Members of the Vermont Senate, 2007-2008 session
