= Anthony Pollina =

American politician (born 1952)

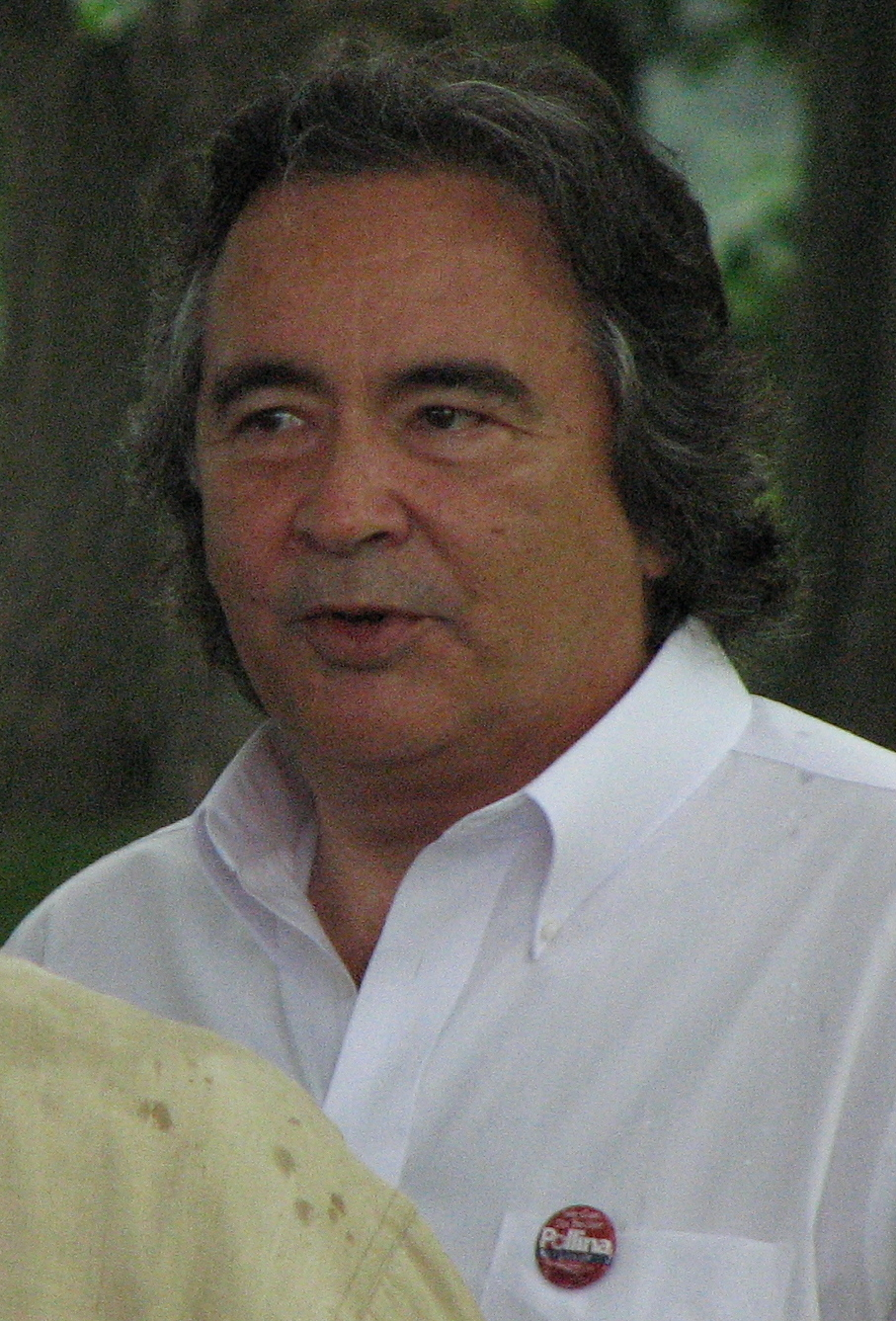

Member of the Vermont Senate from the Washington district
- In office January 5, 2011 – January 4, 2023
- Preceded by: Phil Scott
- Succeeded by: Anne Watson

4th and 7th Chair of the Vermont Progressive Party
- Incumbent
- Assumed office June 9, 2017
- Preceded by: Emma Mulvaney-Stanak
- In office 2007–2009
- Preceded by: Marrisa Caldwell
- Succeeded by: Martha Abbott

Personal details
- Born: February 17, 1952 (age 74) Ridgewood, New Jersey, U.S.
- Party: Progressive
- Other political affiliations: Democratic (1984–1988)
- Spouse: Deborah Wolf
- Education: Johnson State College (BA)

Anthony Pollina (born February 17, 1952) is an American politician who has served as Chair of the Vermont Progressive Party since 2017, and was a member of the Vermont Senate from 2011 to 2023.

== Biography ==
Anthony Pollina was born in Ridgewood, New Jersey on February 17, 1952, the son of Salvatore Pollina and Matilda (Corbo) Pollina. In 1977, he graduated from Johnson State College with a bachelor's degree in political science and environmental studies. At Johnson State, his professors included Bill Doyle, with whom he later served in the State Senate.

Pollina's career includes working as a teacher and the headmaster for an alternative school. In addition, he has taught at Johnson State College, the Community College of Vermont and Vermont College.

In addition to serving in the legislature, Pollina is head of the Vermont Democracy Fund.

== Political activism and platform ==
Pollina served as a Senior Policy Advisor for then Congressman Bernie Sanders from 1991 to 1996.

He worked as policy director and executive director for the Vermont Public Interest Research Group in the late 1990s and early 2000s.

During the 1997 and 1998 sessions of the Vermont Legislature, Pollina advocated for campaign finance legislation that established public funding for statewide political campaigns. In 2002, when his campaign for lieutenant governor failed to qualify for public funding, he filed suit in federal court to overturn the law.

In 2003, Pollina started Equal Time Radio, a political and current events radio show broadcast on Waterbury's WDEV. He quit the radio program in 2007 in order to run for governor.

Pollina was a founding board member of the Vermont Milk Company, a farmer owned and operated dairy in Hardwick, Vermont. The company was established in 2006 with a focus on paying farmers a higher than average price for milk and marketing the products locally. Pollina resigned in 2008 to focus on his campaign for governor.

== Electoral history ==
=== 1984 U.S. congressional election ===
In 1984, Pollina won a Democratic Party primary for Congress against Paul Forlenza and John Tatro. Pollina received 44% of the vote, Forlenza received 24% and Tatro received 27%. Pollina was defeated in the general election by incumbent Republican Jim Jeffords, winning 27% of the vote to Jeffords' 65%.

=== 1986 and 1988 State Representative elections ===
In 1986 and 1988, Pollina was the Democratic nominee for State Representative from the Washington-1 district. He received 49% and 43%, respectively.

=== 2000 Governor ===
In 2000, Pollina ran for Governor of Vermont as a member of the Vermont Progressive Party, receiving 9.5% of the vote in the general election. Pollina ran against incumbent Democrat Howard Dean who received 50.4% of the vote and former State Representative Ruth Dwyer who received 38% of the vote. Due to new campaign financing laws, Pollina became the first candidate in the US to qualify for full public funding of his campaign.

=== 2002 Lieutenant Governor ===
In 2002, Pollina ran as the Progressive Party candidate for Lieutenant Governor of Vermont, receiving 25% of the vote against Republican Brian Dubie and State Senator Peter Shumlin.

=== 2008 Governor ===
In 2008, Pollina ran as an Independent candidate for governor, finishing second with 21.8% of the vote against Republican incumbent Jim Douglas, who won with 53.4% of the vote, and Democrat Gaye Symington who received 21.7% of the vote. The Pollina campaign received unusually strong labor support for an independent candidate, receiving the endorsements of the three largest unions in the state. On September 14, the 10,000 strong Vermont AFL-CIO voted to endorse Pollina; the endorsement came on the heels of the previous endorsements from the Vermont State Employees Association (10,000 members) and the Abenaki Nation (1500 members).

On May 15, Pollina received the endorsement of the Vermont-National Education Association and its 11,500 members. The endorsement by the NEA was the first time the union had backed an independent gubernatorial candidate. NEA-Vermont President Angelo Dorta stated that the endorsement of Pollina was partly because Symington "still tends to talk about our schools in terms of cost containment as opposed to investment".

Pollina also garnered the support of the 3,000-member Gun Owners of Vermont. Along with the labor support, Pollina also received the endorsements and support of many public officials in the state including U.S. Senator Bernie Sanders (I); former Governor Philip H. Hoff (D); Bob Kiss (Progressive), the mayor of Burlington (the state's largest city); Vermont House Agriculture Committee chair David Zuckerman (Progressive); and the Vermont Progressive Party. Several prominent Democratic party activists formed Democrats for Pollina. Some of those involved were former state senators Harvey Carter, Janet Munt, and grassroots organizer Rebecca Moore. Several Vermont Democratic party officials also endorsed Pollina, such as Bristol chair Peter Grant.

=== 2010 State Senator ===
In 2010, incumbent State Senator Phil Scott ran for the Republican nomination for lieutenant governor, while incumbents Bill Doyle and Ann Cummings ran for reelection in the three-member, at-large Washington County Senate District. Pollina ran as a Progressive with Democratic support, and won one of the Democratic nominations. In the general election, Doyle and Cummings were reelected, and Pollina won the third seat.

Democratic primary, August 24, 2010:

- Ann Cummings (D) 5,577 (nominated)
- Anthony Pollina (D) 4,902 (nominated)
- Donny Osman (D) 3,659 (nominated)
- Kimberly Cheney (D) 3,576
- Laura Moore (D) 2,909

General election, November 2, 2010:

- Ann Cummings (D) 12,213 (elected)
- Bill Doyle (R) 11,971 (elected)
- Anthony Pollina (P/D) 10,689 (elected)
- Donny Osman (D) 10,120
- Ed Larson (R) 7,791
- David Harrington (R) 7,175
- Gaelan Brown (I) 2,270

=== 2012 State Senator ===
Pollina was reelected in 2012, along with Washington County incumbents Bill Doyle and Ann Cummings, who defeated Republicans Buddy Barnett and Dexter LeFavour, and Independent Jeremy Hansen. Doyle finished first with 25.4% of all votes cast, Cummings placed second with 24.5%, and Pollina finished third with 21.8%.

In November 2012, Pollina won the "Lawmaker of the Year" award during his freshman term along with fellow lawmaker Rep. Bill Botzow, D-Bennington, by "Vermont Businesses for Social Responsibility". He scored perfectly for the award based on his stance on health care reform, establishing a Genuine Process Indicator, and attempting to overturn the Citizens United court decision.

=== 2014 State Senator ===
In 2014, Pollina was elected to another term, as Washington County reelected all three incumbent Senators. Incumbent Bill Doyle, a Republican, finished first with 10,918 votes. Democrat Ann Cummings had 10,669. Pollina received 9,923 votes, placing ahead of fourth-place finisher Republican Patricia McDonald, who received 8,488.

=== 2016 State Senator ===
Pollina was reelected to another term, as was incumbent Democrat Ann Cummings; incumbent Bill Doyle was defeated by Francis Brooks, the former majority leader of the Vermont House of Representatives and former Sergeant at Arms of the Vermont State House.

- Ann Cummings (D), 17,013, 22.4%
- Anthony Pollina (P/D), 15,212, 20.00%
- Francis Brooks (D), 13,689, 18%
- Bill Doyle (R), 13,350, 17.6%
- Mike Doyle (R), 8,384, 11%
- Josh Fitzhugh (R), 8,233, 10.8%

=== 2018 State Senator ===
Pollina was reelected, as was Ann Cummings. With Francis Brooks not running for another term, the third seat was won by Democrat Andrew Perchlik. Pollina, Cummings, and Perchlik defeated Republicans Chris Bradley, Ken Alger, and Dwayne Tucker and independent Barre Wadle.

- Ann Cummings (D), 16,834, 24.5%
- Anthony Pollina (P/D), 14,547, 21.2%
- Andrew Perchlik (D), 12,614, 18.4%
- Chris Bradley (R), 7,523, 11.0%
- Ken Alger (R), 7,244, 10.6%
- Dwayne Tucker (R), 7,195, 10.5%
- Barry Wadle (I), 2,565, 3.7%
- Other/Write-in, 87, .01%

=== 2020 State Senator ===
Pollina, Cummings, and Perchlik were all reelected.

Democratic Primary:

- Ann Cummings, 8,590, 31.0%
- Andrew Perchlik, 7,643, 27.6%
- Anthony Pollina, 6,558, 23.6%
- Theo Kennedy, 4,812, 17.3%
- Write-ins, 134, 0.5%

General election:

- Ann Cummings (D), 21,159, 25.2%
- Anthony Pollina (P/D), 17,200, 20.5%
- Andrew Perchlik (D), 15,029, 17.9%
- Dwayne Tucker (R), 9,258, 11.0%
- Dawnmarie Tomasi (R), 9,191, 11.0%
- Ken Alger (R), 9,113, 10.9%
- Paul Vallerand (I), 2,678, 3.2%
- Write-ins, 186, 0.2%

=== 2022 State Senator ===
Pollina announced he was not running for reelection to his State Senate seat in May 2022, and retired from the Senate upon the end of his term in 2023.

== Family ==
He resides in Middlesex, Vermont with his wife Deborah; they are the parents of two daughters, Alessandra and Maya.

== Health ==
Pollina was diagnosed with Parkinson's disease after first noticing the symptoms during his 2008 campaign for governor. His condition worsened until he underwent surgery following his 2016 reelection. In a media interview, Pollina reported that post-surgery his symptoms had regressed significantly, though he did not know his future prognosis.

== Sources ==
=== Internet ===
- "Vermont Marriage Records, 1909-2008, Entry for Anthony Pollina and Deborah Wolf". Ancestry.com. Provo, UT: Ancestry.com, LLC.
- "Vermont Birth Records, 1909-2008 Entry for Maya Wolf-Pollina". Ancestry.com. Provo, UT: Ancestry.com, LLC.
- "Vermont Birth Records, 1909-2008 Entry for Alessandra Wolf-Pollina". Ancestry.com. Provo, UT: Ancestry.com, LLC.

=== Books ===
- Condos, James (December 1, 2014). Biographical Sketches of Federal and State Officers and Members of the General Assembly of 2015-2016 (PDF). Montpelier, VT: Vermont Secretary of State. p. 19.

=== Newspapers ===
- Page, Candace (October 13, 2000). "Pollina: Candidate Urges End to Corporate Influence". Burlington Free Press. Burlington, VT. p. 6.

Party political offices
First	Progressive nominee for Governor of Vermont; 2000	Succeeded by Michael Badamo
First	Progressive nominee for Lieutenant Governor of Vermont; 2002	Succeeded by Steven R. "Steve" Hingtgen
