= Mark MacDonald (Vermont politician) =

American politician

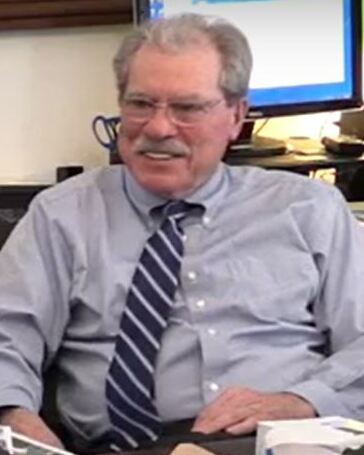
- MacDonald in 2019

Member of the Vermont Senate from the Orange County district
- In office January 2003 – January 2025
- Preceded by: William Corrow
- Succeeded by: Larry Hart
- In office January 1997 – January 2001
- Preceded by: Stephen W. Webster
- Succeeded by: William Corrow

Member of the Vermont House of Representatives from the Orange-2 district
- In office July 1983 – January 1995
- Preceded by: Barbara MacDonald
- Succeeded by: Marion Milne; Philip C. Winters (2 member district)

Personal details
- Born: December 18, 1942 (age 83) Middletown, Connecticut, U.S.
- Party: Democratic
- Spouse: Roberta June Pilk (m. 1983)
- Children: 3
- Education: Borough of Manhattan Community College; Clark University; Norwich University
- Profession: Teacher, Farmer

Mark A. MacDonald (born December 18, 1942) is a Vermont educator, farmer, and Democratic Party politician who served several terms in both the Vermont House of Representatives and Vermont Senate.

== Early life ==
Mark Alexander MacDonald was born in Middletown, Connecticut on December 18, 1942. His father was Donald Gordon MacDonald, a longtime official with the Agency for International Development who directed AID's activities in Vietnam during the peak of the Vietnam War, and his mother was Barbara (McCloskey) MacDonald, a teacher, farmer and member of the Vermont House of Representatives. MacDonald's family spent summers in Vermont beginning in 1947, and MacDonald became a permanent resident of Vermont in 1974. He is a longtime resident of Williamstown.

MacDonald was educated in New Jersey and Washington, DC, and graduated from Washington's Woodrow Wilson High School. In 1966, he graduated from the Borough of Manhattan Community College with an associate degree in liberal arts. MacDonald served in the United States Army from 1968 to 1970, including eighteen months of Vietnam War service.

In 1972, MacDonald received a Bachelor of Arts degree in Government & International Relations from Clark University; he then attended Norwich University to obtain his certification as a school teacher. In addition to teaching social studies at Randolph Union High School, MacDonald owned and operated a working cattle farm.

MacDonald is a member of several clubs, civic organizations, and advocacy groups, including: Orange Southwest Teachers Association; Vermont Beef Producers Association; Orange County Farm Bureau; American Legion; Vietnam Veterans of America; and Chelsea Fish and Game Club. From 1984 to 1994, he served on the Williamstown Planning Commission.

== Political career ==
In 1983, MacDonald was appointed to the Vermont House of Representatives to fill the vacancy caused by the death of his mother, who was serving her first term. He was reelected five times, and served from July 1983 to January 1995. In 1994 he was the Democratic nominee for the Orange County seat in the Vermont Senate, and was defeated by the Republican incumbent, Stephen W. Webster.

In 1996, MacDonald defeated Webster for the Senate seat; he served two terms, January 1997 to January 2001. In 2000, MacDonald was defeated by Republican William Corrow, a defeat attributed largely to backlash following MacDonald's support for Vermont's Civil Unions law. In their 2002 rematch, MacDonald defeated Corrow. He was reelected every two years since, and has served since January 2003. In four more elections—1998, 2006, 2010, and 2016—MacDonald defeated Webster.

In 2017, MacDonald was elected as the Senate's assistant majority leader. According to press reports, he agreed to serve in this post with second-term Senator Becca Balint in the majority leader's position as a means of bridging the gap between the Senate's newer, younger members and its "old guard" veterans. In 2021, he was succeeded as Whip by Cheryl Hooker.

As of 2017, MacDonald was chairman of the Legislative Committee on Administrative Rules. He is also vice chairman of the Senate Finance Committee, and a member of the Natural Resources and Energy, Rules, and Joint Energy Committees.

MacDonald won reelection in 2018 and 2020. In 2022, he experienced a stroke, which limited his ability to campaign, but he was narrowly reelected. MacDonald was defeated in the 2024 election.

== Family ==
In 1983, MacDonald was married to Roberta June Pilk. They are the parents of three children, daughters Janet and Rustie, and son Max (Mark Jr.); they also cared for several foster children.

== Electoral history ==
Vermont's Orange County Senate District election, 1994
Party	Candidate	Votes	%
Democratic	Mark A. MacDonald	3,558	46.8
Republican	Stephen W. Webster	4,047	53.2

Vermont's Orange County Senate District election, 1996
Party	Candidate	Votes	%
Democratic	Mark A. MacDonald	4,576	50.8
Republican	Stephen W. Webster	4,403	48.9

Vermont's Orange County Senate District election, 1998
Party	Candidate	Votes	%
Democratic	Mark A. MacDonald	4,217	52.7
Republican	Stephen W. Webster	3,572	45.0
Libertarian	Scott Berkey	204	2.6

Vermont's Orange County Senate District election, 2000
Party	Candidate	Votes	%
Democratic	Mark A. MacDonald	4,902	46.2
Republican	William Corrow	5,215	49.1
Libertarian	Scott Berkey	487	4.6

Vermont's Orange County Senate District election, 2002
Primary election
Party	Candidate	Votes	%
Democratic	Mark A. MacDonald	1,047	97.6
General election
Democratic	Mark A. MacDonald	4,290	52.7
Republican	William Corrow	3,844	47.2

Vermont's Orange County Senate District election, 2004
Primary election
Party	Candidate	Votes	%
Democratic	Mark A. MacDonald	895	98.9
General election
Democratic	Mark A. MacDonald	5,979	58.2
Republican	Brian Kenyon	4,284	41.7

Vermont's Orange County Senate District election, 2006
Primary election
Party	Candidate	Votes	%
Democratic	Mark A. MacDonald	1,345	97.9
General election
Democratic	Mark A. MacDonald	5,485	61.9
Republican	Stephen W. Webster	3,371	38.1

Vermont's Orange County Senate District election, 2008
Primary election
Party	Candidate	Votes	%
Democratic	Mark A. MacDonald	557	98.9
General election
Democratic	Mark A. MacDonald	7,397	73.2
Constitution	Charlie Russell	2,691	26.6

Vermont's Orange County Senate District election, 2010
Primary election
Party	Candidate	Votes	%
Democratic	Mark A. MacDonald	2,203	96.4
General election
Democratic	Mark A. MacDonald	4,524	56.1
Republican	Stephen W. Webster	3,517	43.7

Vermont's Orange County Senate District election, 2012
Primary election
Party	Candidate	Votes	%
Democratic	Mark A. MacDonald	1,708	71.7
Democratic	Tig Tillinghast	671	28.2
General election
Democratic	Mark A. MacDonald	7,618	96.0

Vermont's Orange County Senate District election, 2014
Primary election
Party	Candidate	Votes	%
Democratic	Mark A. MacDonald	939	97.0
General election
Democratic	Mark A. MacDonald	3,797	54.2
Republican	Robert C. Frenier	3,200	45.7

Vermont's Orange County Senate District election, 2016
Party	Candidate	Votes	%
Democratic	Mark A. MacDonald	5,723	54.0
Republican	Stephen W. Webster	4,409	41.6

Vermont's Orange County Senate District election, 2018
Party	Candidate	Votes	%
Democratic	Mark A. MacDonald	5,167	57.3
Republican	Bill T. Huff	4,409	41.6
Write-in		11	0.1

Vermont's Orange County Senate District election, 2020
Party	Candidate	Votes	%
Democratic	Mark A. MacDonald	6,420	54.5
Republican	Bill T. Huff	5,321	45.2
Write-in		33	0.3

Vermont's Orange County Senate District election, 2022
Party	Candidate	Votes	%
Democratic	Mark A. MacDonald	5,685	55.5
Republican	John Klar	4,519	44.1
Write-in		40	0.4

Vermont's Orange County Senate District election, 2024
Party	Candidate	Votes	%
Republican	Larry Hart	7,230	56.5
Democratic	Mark A. MacDonald	5,523	43.2
Write-in		43	0.3

== Sources ==
=== Internet ===
- Secretary of the Vermont Senate. "Biography, Senator Mark A. MacDonald". Vermont State Senate. Montpelier, VT: Vermont General Assembly.
- "Virginia Marriage Records, 1936-2014, entry for Mark Alexander MacDonald". Ancestry.com. Provo, UT: Ancestry.com, LLC.

=== Newspapers ===
- "Son to Complete Mom's House Term". The Burlington Free Press. Burlington, VT. Associated Press. July 2, 1983. p. 16.
- "MacDonald Cites 'Results' In Reëlection Campaign". Randolph Herald. Randolph, VT. August 3, 2000.
- "Corrow Enjoys Narrow Victory". The Burlington Free Press. Burlington, VT. November 8, 2000. p. 12.
- "Legislature: Democrats Make Gains". The Burlington Free Press. Burlington, VT. November 6, 2002. p. 8.
- Barnes, Bart (January 15, 2004). "Obituary, AID Official Donald MacDonald". Washington Post. Washington, DC.
- "BMCC was 'a second chance'". BMCC News. New York, NY. April 24, 2012. Archived from the original on April 29, 2012 – via Wayback Machine.
- Doyle-Burr, Nora (October 19, 2016). "Orange County Senate Seat Rivals Face Off for Sixth Time". Valley News. West Lebanon, NH.
- Walters, John (January 4, 2017). "Senate Democrats Elect Becca Balint as Majority Leader". Seven Days. Burlington, VT.
- McCallum, Kevin (November 22, 2020). "In Coming Session, Women Will Dominate Vermont Senate Leadership". Vermont Seven Days. Burlington, VT.
- "Republican beats out longtime incumbent for Orange County Senate seat". Valley News. Lebanon, New Hampshire. November 6, 2024.
- D'Auria, Peter (November 7, 2024). "GOP finally unseats Sen. Mark MacDonald, 34-year veteran of the Statehouse". VT Digger. Montpelier, Vermont.

=== Books ===
- Vermont Legislative Directory and State Manual. Montpelier, VT: Vermont Secretary of State. 1989. p. 561.
- Vermont Legislative Directory and State Manual. Montpelier, VT: Vermont Secretary of State. 1997. p. 162.
