= Philip C. Winters =

American politician

Philip C. Winters (born 1937) is a Republican politician who was elected to the Vermont House of Representatives in 1994. He represents the Orange-1 Representative District. He did not run for reelection in 2014, and served from January 1995 to January 2015.
