= Michelle Fay =

American politician

Member of the Vermont House of Representatives from the Caledonia-3 district
- In office 2012–2014

Personal details
- Party: Democratic
- Education: University of Vermont; Harvard Kennedy School

Michelle Fay is an American politician. She served as a Democratic member for the Caledonia-3 district of the Vermont House of Representatives from 2012 to 2014.
