= Windham (Vermont Senate district) =

Coordinates: 42.99°N 72.72°W

The Windham district is one of 16 districts of the Vermont Senate. The current district plan is included in the redistricting and reapportionment plan developed by the Vermont General Assembly following the 2020 U.S. census, which applies to legislatures elected in 2022, 2024, 2026, 2028, and 2030.

The Windham district includes all of Windham County except the town of Wilmington.

== District senators ==
2005-2006

- Roderick M. Gander, Democrat
- Jeanette K. White, Democrat

2007-2008

- Peter Shumlin, Democrat
- Jeanette K. White, Democrat

As of 2017

- Becca Balint, Democrat
- Jeanette K. White, Democrat

== Towns and cities in the Windham district ==
=== Windham County ===
- Athens
- Brattleboro
- Brookline
- Dover
- Dummerston
- Grafton
- Guilford
- Halifax
- Jamaica
- Londonderry
- Marlboro
- Newfane
- Putney
- Rockingham
- Somerset
- Stratton
- Townshend
- Vernon
- Wardsboro
- Westminster
- Whitingham
- Windham

== See also ==
- Members of the Vermont Senate, 2005–06 session
