= Robert A. Starr =

American politician (born 1942)

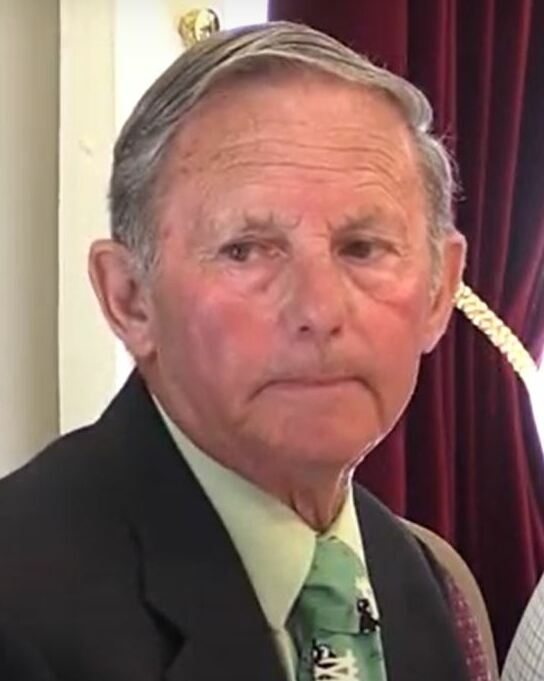
- Starr in 2019

Member of the Vermont Senate
- In office 2005–2025
- Succeeded by: Samuel Douglass

Personal details
- Born: December 17, 1942 (age 83) Hartford, Connecticut, U.S.
- Party: Democratic
- Spouse: Anita Cadieux
- Children: 1
- Education: Vermont Technical College
- Occupation: Politician

Robert A. Starr (born December 17, 1942) is an American politician from Vermont who served as a Democratic member of the Vermont State Senate from 2005 to 2025. He has represented the Essex-Orleans senate district since 2004. Since redistricting in 2022 he has represented the Orleans District. He had previously spent 25 years in the Vermont House of Representatives.

== Biography ==
Robert Starr was born in Hartford, Connecticut, on December 17, 1942. He has lived in Troy, Vermont since moving there in 1944. He received an Associate Degree in agriculture from Vermont Technical College.

Starr is married to Anita Cadieux. The couple has one son.

He is a professional truck driver. Starr is president of his own transportation company. He is director of the Vermont Truck and Bus Association.

== Public life ==
=== Vermont General Assembly ===
Starr was elected to the Vermont House of Representatives in 1978 and served there until 2004. From 1985 to 2000, he chaired the House Agriculture Committee. He was elected to the Vermont Senate in 2004 and was re-elected two years later. Starr continued to win reelection until 2024, when he retired. He was succeeded by Republican Samuel Douglass.

=== Other government service ===
- Troy school board
- Orleans-Essex North Supervisory Union, school board
- Troy zoning board
- Troy planning commission
- Troy board of civil authority
- Troy town moderator
- North Country Union High School moderator
- Trustee, Vermont State Colleges

== Goodyear Highway Hero award ==
On September 14, 2005, there was an incident near Trois-Rivières, Quebec involving Starr. While driving in a truck, the pavement collapsed and Starr's vehicle as well as another passenger car driven by a woman went off the road. The woman's car caught fire and she was trapped in it. Starr was able to rescue the driver. For this effort he was later awarded the Goodyear Highway Hero award.

== See also ==
- Members of the Vermont Senate, 2005-2006 session
- Members of the Vermont Senate, 2007-2008 session
