= Franklin (Vermont Senate district) =

The Franklin district is one of 16 districts of the Vermont Senate. The current district plan is included in the redistricting and reapportionment plan developed by the Vermont General Assembly following the 2020 U.S. census, which applies to legislatures elected in 2022, 2024, 2026, 2028, and 2030.

The district is currently represented by Randy Brock (R) since 2017 (having previously served from 2009-2013), and Robert Norris (R) since 2023.

The Franklin district includes all of Franklin County, along with some parts of others.

== Previous district senators ==
- Corey Parent (R), 2018-2023
- Dustin Allard Degree (R), 2015-2017
- Norman McAllister (R), 2013-2017
- Randy Brock (R), 2009-2013 (first and second terms)
- Carolyn W. Branagan (R), 2003-2019
- Don Collins (D), 2003-2009 and 2013-2015
- Sara B. Kittell (D), 1995-2013

== Towns and cities in the Franklin district, 2002–2012 elections ==
=== Franklin County ===
- Bakersfield
- Berkshire
- Enosburg
- Fairfax
- Fairfield
- Fletcher
- Franklin
- Georgia
- Highgate
- Sheldon
- St. Albans
- St. Albans Town
- Swanton

=== Grand Isle County ===
- Alburgh
