= Diane B. Snelling =

American politician (born 1952)

Diane Snelling

Member of the Vermont Senate from the Chittenden district
- In office January 2002 – March 2016
- Preceded by: Barbara Snelling
- Succeeded by: Helen Riehle

Personal details
- Born: March 18, 1952 (age 74) Philadelphia, Pennsylvania, U.S.
- Party: Republican
- Education: Harvard/Radcliffe College, New York University
- Occupation: Artist

Diane B. Snelling (born March 18, 1952) is an American politician from Vermont who served as a Republican member of the Vermont Senate, representing Chittenden County. Snelling was first appointed to the Vermont State Senate in January 2002 by Governor Howard Dean to serve the remainder of her mother, Barbara Snelling's, term in office, after her mother retired from the Senate.

She won election to her seat in 2002 and was re-elected in 2004, 2006, 2008, 2010, 2012, and 2014. She resigned in 2016 to become head of the Vermont Natural Resources Board.

== Biography ==
Snelling was born in Philadelphia on March 18, 1952. She received an A.B./V.E.S. (Visual and Environmental Studies) degree from Harvard/Radcliffe College in Cambridge, Massachusetts in 1974 and a M.A. in art from New York University in 1994.

Snelling moved to the town of Hinesburg, Vermont in 1983 and continues to reside there. She works as an artist.

Snelling's father, Richard Snelling, served as Governor of Vermont from 1977 to 1985 and was elected again in 1990, serving until his death in 1991. After her father's death, Snelling's mother, Barbara Snelling, went on to serve as Vermont's Lieutenant Governor, and then as a State Senator.

In 2002, after her mother resigned for health reasons, Snelling was appointed to serve out the remainder of her mother's term by former Governor Howard Dean. She served until 2016, and was the only Republican in the six-member Chittenden County State Senate delegation during her tenure.

== Public life ==
Her public service includes:

- Member, Hinesburg, Vermont Planning Commission (1984);
- Member, Hinesburg School Board (1985–1991);
- State Senator, 2002–2016; and
- Member, Vermont Advisory Committee, United States Commission on Civil Rights (appointed 2008).

In 2013, Snelling considered pursuing a candidacy for Senate President, but ultimately decided against running.

== See also ==
- Members of the Vermont Senate, 2005–2006 session
- Members of the Vermont Senate, 2007–2008 session
