= Jane Kitchel =

American politician

M. Jane Kitchel
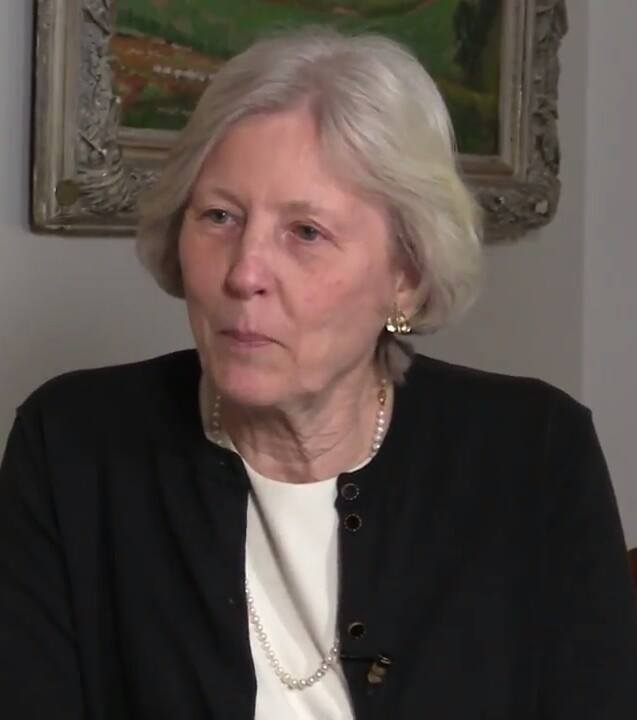

Member of the Vermont Senate from the Caledonia Senate district
- In office 2005–2025
- Preceded by: Robert D. Ide
- Succeeded by: Scott Beck

Personal details
- Born: August 23, 1945 (age 80) St. Johnsbury, Vermont, U.S.
- Party: Democratic

Martha Jane Beattie Kitchel (born August 23, 1945) is a former American politician who served as a Democratic member of the Vermont State Senate, representing the Caledonia senate district from January 2005 to January 2025.

== Early life ==
Kitchel was born in St. Johnsbury, Vermont, on August 23, 1945. The second of Catherine and Harold Beattie's ten children, she also had four half-siblings. Born to a fifth-generation Vermont farming family, she grew up on her family's dairy farm in Danville, Vermont. In addition to running the farm, Kitchel's parents also were involved in local politics: her mother was a member of the Vermont Farm Bureau and a former state legislator, while her father was a local selectman. She went to Danville High School and graduated in 1963. In 1967, Kitchel received her bachelor's degree from Wilson College.

Kitchel volunteered on multiple Democratic political campaigns in the 1960s, including Philip H. Hoff's campaign for Governor and John F. Kennedy's presidential campaign.

== Career ==
After graduating college in 1967, Kitchel began her career as an entry-level social worker in the St. Johnsbury district office of the Vermont Department of Social Welfare. Continuing to work in the department, she oversaw six district offices by 1979 and was appointed deputy commissioner of the Department of Social Welfare by Governor Madeleine Kunin in 1985. In 1992, Governor Howard Dean appointed her commissioner of the Department of Social Welfare, where she had been working for 25 years.

Later in 1992, Kitchel was appointed secretary of the Vermont Agency of Human Services, Vermont's largest state agency, where she served until her retirement in 2002. Throughout her work in Social Welfare and Human Services, she played an instrumental role in enacting Vermont's 2-1-1 information and referral service and the Ready Up cash assistance program. Governor Howard Dean praised her as "the driving force" behind his administration's welfare reforms and described her as "the architect of our universal healthcare program," referring to Dr. Dynasaur, Vermont's publicly funded health insurance program for children, which was established in 1989. Kitchel later proposed expanding Dr. Dynasaur coverage to children in families making up to 300 percent of the federal poverty line, which was achieved in October 1998.

She was elected to the Vermont Senate in November 2004, becoming the first Democratic state senator from Caledonia County in 16 years. She has been reelected every two years since, most recently in 2022. On May 17, 2024, Kitchel announced that she would not run for reelection in 2024.

Due to her experience in the state government, Kitchel was appointed vice chair of the Senate Appropriations Committee in her first term. She became chair of the Senate Appropriations Committee in 2011 and also serves as clerk of the Senate Transportation Committee. She also serves on the Health Reform Oversight and Joint Fiscal committees, as well as on the Governor's Task Force on Hunger and the Vermont Justice for Children Task Force.

== Personal life ==
She is married to Robert (Guil) Kitchel and resides in Danville. They have one son, Nathaniel.

Kitchel's sister, Catherine "Kitty" Toll, serves in the Vermont House of Representatives. Toll became Chair of the Vermont House Appropriations Committee in 2017, now serving as the House counterpart to Kitchel, who has chaired the Senate Appropriations Committee since 2011.

Kitchel actively volunteers in her local community and serves on the boards of the Vermont Foodbank, Bradford's Enhanced Living Inc., the Northeast Regional Community High School of Vermont, and the Northeastern Vermont Area Health Education Center. She is also a Corporator for the Northeastern Vermont Regional Hospital.

== See also ==
- Members of the Vermont Senate, 2005–2006 session
- Members of the Vermont Senate, 2007–2008 session
