= Lamoille (Vermont Senate district) =

Coordinates: 44.64°N 72.68°W

The Lamoille district is one of 13 Vermont Senate districts included in the redistricting and reapportionment plan developed by the Vermont General Assembly following the 2010 U.S. census. The plan applies to legislatures elected in 2012, 2014, 2016, 2018, and 2020. A new plan will be developed in 2022 following the 2020 U.S. census.

The Lamoille district includes all of Lamoille County except the town of Wolcott which are in the Essex-Orleans district.

== District senator ==
(As of 2017)

- Richard Westman, Republican

== Towns and cities in the Lamoille district, 2012–2022 elections ==
=== Lamoille County ===
- Belvidere
- Cambridge
- Eden
- Elmore
- Hyde Park
- Johnson
- Morristown
- Stowe
- Waterville

== Towns and cities in the Lamoille district, 2002–2012 elections ==
=== Lamoille County ===
- Belvidere
- Cambridge
- Elmore
- Hyde Park
- Johnson
- Morristown
- Stowe
- Waterville

== See also ==
- Vermont Senate districts, 2012–2022
