= Grand Isle (Vermont Senate district) =

The Grand Isle district is one of 16 districts of the Vermont Senate. The current district plan is included in the redistricting and reapportionment plan developed by the Vermont General Assembly following the 2020 U.S. census, which applies to legislatures elected in 2022, 2024, 2026, 2028, and 2030.

The Grand Isle district includes all of Grand Isle County, along with some parts of others.

== District senators ==
As of 2025:

- Patrick Brennan, Republican

== Towns and cities in the Grand Isle district, 2002–2012 elections ==
=== Grand Isle County ===
- Grand Isle
- Isle La Motte
- North Hero
- South Hero

=== Chittenden County ===
- Colchester
