= Windsor (Vermont Senate district) =

One of 16 districts of the Vermont Senate

The Windsor district is one of 16 districts of the Vermont Senate. The current district plan is included in the redistricting and reapportionment plan developed by the Vermont General Assembly following the 2020 U.S. census, which applies to legislatures elected in 2022, 2024, 2026, 2028, and 2030.The Windsor district includes all of Windsor County, along with some parts of others.

== District senators ==
As of 2016:

- Alison H. Clarkson, Democrat
- Alice Nikita, Democrat
- Richard McCormack, Democrat

2005-2006

- John F. Campbell, Democrat
- Matt Dunne, Democrat
- Peter F. Welch, Democrat

2007-2016

- John F. Campbell, Democrat
- Dick McCormack, Democrat
- Alice Nitka, Democrat

As of 2017

- Alison Clarkson, Democrat
- Dick McCormack, Democrat
- Alice Nitka, Democrat

== Towns and cities in the Windsor district, 2002–2012 elections ==
=== Windsor County ===
- Andover
- Baltimore
- Barnard
- Bethel
- Bridgewater
- Cavendish
- Chester
- Hartford
- Hartland
- Ludlow
- Norwich
- Plymouth
- Pomfret
- Reading
- Rochester
- Royalton
- Sharon
- Springfield
- Stockbridge
- Weathersfield
- West Windsor
- Weston
- Windsor
- Woodstock
