= Orange (Vermont Senate district) =

Coordinates: 44.70°N 73.32°W

The Orange district is one of 16 districts of the Vermont Senate. The current district plan is included in the redistricting and reapportionment plan developed by the Vermont General Assembly following the 2020 U.S. census, which applies to legislatures elected in 2022, 2024, 2026, 2028, and 2030.

The Orange district includes most of Orange County.

As of 2022, the Orange district had 21,954 residents.

== District senators ==
As of 2023

- Mark A. MacDonald, Democrat

== Towns in the Orange district ==
=== Orange County ===
- Bradford
- Brookfield
- Chelsea
- Corinth
- Fairlee
- Randolph
- Strafford
- Topsham
- Tunbridge
- Vershire
- Washington
- West Fairlee
- Williamstown

== Towns and cities in the Orange district, 2002–2012 elections ==
=== Orange County ===
- Braintree
- Brookfield
- Chelsea
- Corinth
- Randolph
- Strafford
- Thetford
- Tunbridge
- Vershire
- Washington
- Williamstown
- Orange

== See also ==
- Vermont Senate
