= William T. Doyle =

American politician (1926–2024)

Bill Doyle
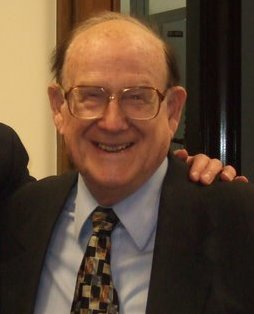
- Doyle in 2007

Member of the Vermont Senate from the Washington district
- In office 1969–2017
- Preceded by: Daniel B. Ruggles III
- Succeeded by: Francis K. Brooks

Personal details
- Born: May 8, 1926 New York City, New York, U.S.
- Died: August 15, 2024 (aged 98) Northfield, Vermont, U.S.
- Party: Republican
- Spouse: Olene Ottoway (m. 1956)
- Children: 3
- Education: Princeton University; Columbia University
- Profession: Academic, author

William T. Doyle (May 8, 1926 – August 15, 2024) was an American politician, academic, and author who served as a Republican member of the Vermont Senate. As a senator from the Washington Vermont Senate District from 1969 to 2017, he is the longest-serving state legislator in Vermont history.

Doyle was born in New York City, and raised in Sea Girt, New Jersey. He graduated from Princeton University in 1949, and received master's (1955) and doctoral (1960) degrees from Columbia University. In 1958, Doyle became a professor of political science at Johnson State College, and continued to teach while serving in Vermont's part-time legislature. After becoming a resident of Montpelier, he became active in politics as a Republican and served on the party's city and county committees, in addition to serving on the city school board and in other local government positions.

After two unsuccessful campaigns, in 1968 Doyle won election to the Vermont Senate. He continued to win reelection every two years until 2016, when he was defeated in his bid for a 25th two-year term. At 48 years, Doyle's service makes him the longest-serving member of the state legislature in Vermont history. During his tenure, he was the longtime chairman of the Senate's Government Operations Committee, and he served as both Assistant Minority Leader and Minority Leader.

After being defeated for reelection, Doyle continued teaching at Johnson State College until retiring in 2018. The author of a 1984 book on Vermont political history, The Vermont Political Tradition, in 2018 he also published a second work, A Lasting Impression: Vermont Historical Articles and Local Politics.

== Early life ==
Doyle was born in New York City on May 8, 1926. He was raised in New Jersey, and his father Edward T. Doyle (d. 1984) was the mayor of Sea Girt. Bill Doyle was educated at Spring Lake Grammar School, Manasquan High School and the Lawrenceville School. He graduated from Princeton University in 1949, and received his master's (1955) and doctoral degrees (1960) from Columbia University.

Doyle became a professor of political science at Johnson State College in 1958, and taught there until retiring in 2018. He became a resident of Montpelier, Vermont in 1959.

== Political career ==
In the 1960s, Doyle became active in local politics and government, serving on the Montpelier School Board from 1964 to 1968, and as chairman from 1967 to 1968. He served on the Union #32 District High School Board from 1967 to 1968, and on the advisory committee of the Barre Area Vocational High School from 1965 to 1968. Doyle was also active in the Republican Party, including service on the Montpelier and Washington County committees, a delegate to numerous state conventions, and a delegate to the Republican National Conventions in 1976 and 1988.

Doyle was first elected to the Vermont Senate in 1968, after running unsuccessfully in the three-member at-large Washington County district in 1964 and 1966. Doyle placed sixth of seven candidates in the 1964 Republican primary, but obtained enough write-in votes to win one of the three Democratic nominations, which he declined. In 1966, Republican Daniel B. Ruggles III defeated Doyle by two votes for the third Republican nomination; Doyle initially appeared to have won, but a recount uncovered 22 ballots for Ruggles that had not been included in the original tally. In 1968, Ruggles ran unsuccessfully for the Republican nomination for lieutenant governor, and Doyle was elected as his successor.

Doyle was reelected every two years until 2014, and served continuously from 1969 to 2017. Washington County continues to elect three senators at-large, and Doyle was routinely the highest finisher among the district's candidates. He was the longtime chairman of the Senate's Government Operations Committee, and served as the Assistant Minority Leader for several years. Doyle was the Senate's Minority Leader from 2010 to 2013.

== Author ==
In 1984, Doyle published The Vermont Political Tradition, a survey of the state's political development from its formation as an independent republic in 1777 to the election of Madeline Kunin as Vermont Governor. He has continued to publish updates periodically since the book's first edition.

In 2018, Doyle published a second historical work A Lasting Impression: Vermont Historical Articles and Local Politics.

== Doyle survey ==
Beginning in 1969, Doyle conducted the annual "Doyle Survey" of town meeting participants across Vermont. Attracting thousands of responses annually, the Doyle poll asks respondents for their views on about a dozen issues of the day. Despite the poll's unscientific nature, the results are widely reported on in Vermont media and considered a barometer of current public opinion.

== 2016 defeat for reelection ==
In 2016, Doyle was defeated for reelection; he finished fourth among the candidates running at-large in his State Senate district; incumbents Ann Cummings (Democrat) and Anthony Pollina (Progressive/Democrat) were reelected, and the third-place finisher was Democrat Francis K. Brooks, former Majority Leader of the Vermont House of Representatives and former Sergeant-at-Arms of the Vermont State House. Doyle trailed Brooks by approximately 200 votes; after initially indicating that he would request a recount, Doyle ultimately decided against doing so.

== Honors ==
On January 10, 2017, Doyle was honored in the Vermont Senate chamber, including resolutions of appreciation, and current and former senators recounting stories of their experiences working with him. In addition, Governor Phil Scott, one of Doyle's former colleagues from the Washington County district, signed a proclamation designating Vermont's 2017 local election and town meeting date, March 7, as "Bill Doyle Town Meeting Day".

In May 2018, Doyle retired from Johnson State College. At a ceremony to celebrate the event, he was designated professor emeritus, and a granite bench created to recognize his contributions to the college was installed outside the campus library.

== Personal life and death ==
In 1956, Doyle married the former Olene May Ottoway (1932–2023). They were the parents of son Lee (1961–2021) and fraternal twins son Keith and daughter Kelly (b. 1965).

Doyle died at an elder care facility in Northfield, Vermont, on August 15, 2024, at the age of 98.
