= Kevin J. Mullin =

American politician (born 1958)

Kevin J. Mullin (born November 19, 1958) is a Vermont businessman and Republican politician who has served in both the Vermont House of Representatives and Vermont Senate.

== Biography ==
Kevin John Mullin was born in the city of Rutland, Vermont on November 19, 1958, the son of Robert J. Mullin and Patricia M. (Smith) Mullin. He attended the schools of Rutland City, and graduated from Rutland High School. Mullin is a graduate of Castleton State College, where he received a Bachelor of Science degree in business with a major in finance.

Mullin has been involved in several business ventures, including real estate development, management and ownership of movie theaters, and owner of Vermont Roots, a distributor of New England-made food products. He has also been a part-time instructor at the Community College of Vermont. He is the chief executive officer of Glenwood Movieplex Corporation, an independent movie theater chain which has locations throughout the northeast United States.

Mullin has been active in politics and government since he was in his early 20s. Originally a Democrat, while residing in the city of Rutland, Mullin served on the city council, and was an unsuccessful candidate for Vermont Senate in 1984 and mayor in 1987.

As a resident of the town of Rutland, he served on the school board and board of auditors. Mullin's other civic and government activities have included serving on the Rutland Regional Planning Commission, on the board of the Marble Valley Regional Transit District, and as a member of the Rutland Region Chamber of Commerce. In 1998 he was elected to the Vermont House of Representatives as a Republican; he was reelected in 2000 and 2002, and served from January 1999 until resigning in January 2003.

In January 2003, Mullin was appointed to fill the Vermont Senate seat left vacant when John Crowley resigned to become head of the state Department of Banking, Insurance, Securities, and Health Care Administration. Mullin was elected in 2004, and reelected every two years since. From January 2005 until resigning from the Senate Mullin was the Senate's assistant minority leader.

In May 2017, Mullin indicated his intention to resign after Governor Phil Scott appointed him as chairman of the Green Mountain Care Board. He was replaced in the Senate by David Soucy, who Scott appointed to complete the remainder of Mullin's term.

== Family ==
Mullin and his wife Cynthia A. (Sanford) Mullin are the parents of two sons, Brett and Bartley.

== Sources ==
=== Internet ===
- Secretary of the Vermont Senate (2017). "Biography, Kevin J. Mullin". Vermont State Senators, 2017-2018. Montpelier, VT: Vermont General Assembly.
- "Vermont Birth Records, 1909-2008, Entry for Kevin John Mullin". Ancestry.com. Provo, UT: Ancestry.com, LLC.

=== Books ===
- Vermont Legislative Directory and State Manual. Montpelier, VT: Vermont Secretary of State. 2001. p. 206.

=== Newspapers ===
- "Godnick Decides To Run Just Before Filing Deadline". Burlington Free Press. Burlington, VT. July 17, 1984. p. 4B.
- Zingale, Joseph (November 8, 1984). "Moore Refuses to Concede Senate Race in Rutland District to Robillard". Burlington Free Press. Burlington, VT. p. 7B.
- "Theater Cuts Short Santa Film". Burlington Free Press. Burlington, VT. Associated Press. November 18, 1984. p. 3B.
- Shaw, Kent M. (April 6, 1987). "Mayor Young, Problems Old in Rutland". Burlington Free Press. Burlington, VT. p. 1B.
- "Rep. Mullin Joins Senate". Burlington Free Press. Burlington, VT. Associated Press. January 12, 2003. p. 2B.
- Goswami, Neal P. (May 24, 2017). "Scott selects Mullin, Usifer for Green Mountain Care Board". Vermont Press Bureau. Montpelier, VT.
- Goswami, Neal P. (June 20, 2017). "Soucy picked to replace Mullin in Senate". Rutland Herald. Rutland, VT. Archived from the original on July 26, 2017.
