= Norman H. McAllister =

American politician

Norm McAllister

Member of the Vermont Senate from the 21st district
- In office January 2013 – January 2017
- Preceded by: Randy Brock
- Succeeded by: Carolyn Whitney Branagan

Personal details
- Born: September 3, 1951 (age 75) Windsor, Vermont, U.S.
- Party: Republican
- Spouse: Lena Mae McAllister (m. 1951; died 2013)
- Children: 3
- Education: AS in Agricultural Studies Vermont Technical College

Norman H. McAllister (born 1951) is an American politician who was a member of the Vermont Senate. He represented the Alburgh-Franklin district in Northwest Vermont. He was elected to the state legislature in 2002.

He was suspended in 2015 after being arrested on sexual assault charges. Despite his suspension, he ran for reelection in 2016, but lost. After four separate criminal trials, McAllister was cleared of all charges.

== Legislative career ==
McAllister was elected to the Vermont House in 2002 and to the Senate in 2012, attracting little media attention as a legislator. In the House, McAllister sat on the Health and Human Services Committee, and was instrumental in reforming Vermont's child custody laws to make it easier for at-risk children to be placed in the custody of their relatives, rather than the state. A lifelong dairy farmer, Mcallister was one of only two senators to oppose Vermont's bill to require labeling of genetically modified food in 2014. He was appointed assistant minority leader of the Senate Republican caucus in 2014. He ran for re-election in 2016 and lost.

== Criminal charges ==
In May 2015, McAllister was accused of three felony counts of sexual assault and three misdemeanors of prohibited acts, the charges arising from what police describe as a sex-for-rent scheme involving several unwilling tenants. On June 1, 2015, one of the three women listed as victims in the sex crime cases was reported dead of natural causes.

McAllister initially confessed to a reporter that he had had sex with two of his accusers, but later recanted. According to a police affidavit, in a phone conversation to one accuser McAllister stated that "I was forcing you to do something you didn't want to do". McAllister maintained that he was innocent and that the relationships were consensual. After McAllister refused repeated calls to resign from the legislature, he was suspended by a 20-10 vote of the Senate Rules Committee, and his subsequent request for reinstatement was rejected. McAllister's family and other longtime tenant defended him, saying the allegations were false.

=== Trials ===
McAllister's charges were initially divided into two legal trials. Some charges were unexpectedly dismissed on the second day of his first trial at the request of the prosecuting state's attorney, Diane Wheeler. Wheeler stated that "new information" had created an "ethical dilemma" requiring the case to be dropped. The accuser's lawyer explained that her client had lied under oath about a "very, very minor point" unrelated to the claim that McAllister had assaulted her, and that she had advised the accuser not to continue testifying to avoid a potential charge of perjury. McAllister's defense team noted that the accuser's testimony had contained numerous inconsistencies, calling the accuser's credibility into question; they said Wheeler had done "the right thing" after recognizing that the prosecution would have had "a very difficult time meeting their burden."

On January 10, 2017, McAllister made a last-minute plea deal with prosecutors on the remaining charges after a jury had been selected for his second trial. McAllister pleaded no contest to a reduced charge of lewd and lascivious conduct and two counts of prohibited acts. However, McAllister said that he was coerced into the plea deal by his previous attorney and he filed a motion to withdraw the plea deal with his new attorney on February 3. A judge approved the motion and set a tentative trial date for July 12.

On July 15, 2017, a jury found him guilty on a misdemeanor charge of prohibited acts of prostitution, for arranging for his tenant to have sex with a friend of McAllister's in order to pay her electric bill, but not guilty of sexual assault and a second count of prohibited acts. The charge carried a penalty of up to one year in prison. In October 2017, McAllister was sentenced to work crew for 25 days and serve nine to twelve months on probation.

However, the Vermont Supreme Court ordered a retrial on this last count in November 2018, and a subsequent retrial ended in mistrial in April 2019. McAllister was acquitted after a fourth trial was held on October 23, 2019.
