= Ann Cummings =

Vermont businesswoman and Democratic politician

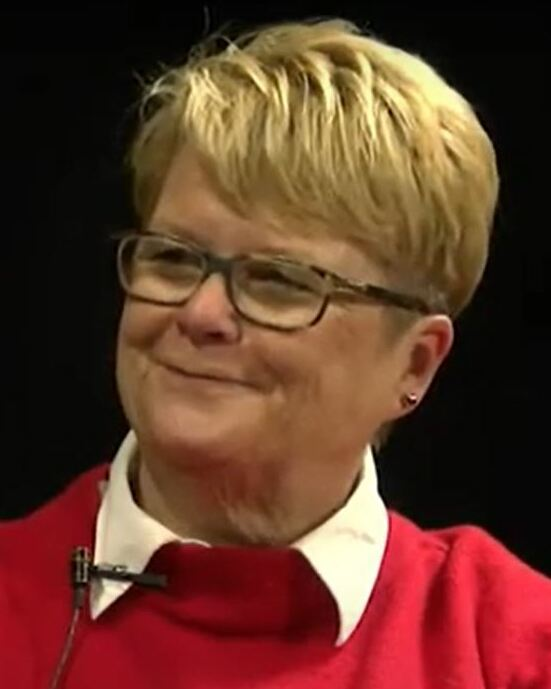
- Cummings in 2018

Member of the Vermont Senate from the Washington County district
- Incumbent
- Assumed office January 1997
- Preceded by: Matt Krauss

Mayor of Montpelier, Vermont
- In office July 1990 – January 1996
- Preceded by: Arthur J. Goss
- Succeeded by: Chuck Karparis

Personal details
- Born: July 20, 1946 (age 80) Holliston, Massachusetts
- Party: Democratic
- Spouse: Regis E. Cummings
- Children: 4
- Education: Cardinal Cushing College; Saint Michael's College
- Profession: Real estate broker

Ann Cummings (born July 20, 1946) is a Vermont businesswoman and Democratic politician. She has served as mayor of Montpelier and a State Senator.

== Biography ==
Ann E. Cummings was born in Holliston, Massachusetts, on July 20, 1946. She was educated in Wantagh, New York and Lexington, Kentucky, and graduated from Lexington Catholic High School. In 1968, Cummings graduated from Cardinal Cushing College with a Bachelor of Arts degree in sociology. She received a Master of Science in Administration degree from Saint Michael's College in 1989.

After college, Cummings was a VISTA volunteer in the Pittsburgh area. She has been involved in several business ventures, and has most recently worked as a real estate broker.

Cummings became active in government and politics after settling in Montpelier, including terms on the city and regional planning commissions, and on the Montpelier City Council. In 1988 she was an unsuccessful candidate for mayor, losing to Arthur J. Goss in a four-way race for the nonpartisan position. In 1990, Cummings defeated Goss; she served from March 1990 to March 1996, and her time in office was most notable for her efforts to coordinate relief efforts after a 1992 flood inundated most of downtown Montpelier.

In 1994, Cummings was an unsuccessful candidate for the Vermont Senate. In 1996, Cummings was elected as one of three senators who represent Washington County at-large. She has been reelected every two years since, and has served since January 1997. From 2001 to 2003, she was the Senate's majority leader. Cummings has served on several committees in the State Senate, most notably Finance and Education. She was chairwoman of the Finance Committee from 2011 to 2013, and the Education Committee from 2015 to 2017. In 2017 she was again named to chair the Finance Committee.

== Family ==
Cummings is married to Regis E. Cummings; they are the parents of four children, three daughters and a son.

== Sources ==
=== Internet ===
- Secretary of the Vermont State Senate. "Biography, Ann Cummings". Vermont General Assembly. Montpelier, VT: Vermont State Senate.

=== News ===
- Bressor, James E. (March 2, 1988). "Goss Unseats Rice as Montpelier Mayor". Burlington Free Press. Burlington, VT. p. 1.
- "Town Meeting Day '90: Montpelier". Burlington Free Press. Burlington, VT. March 7, 1990. p. 6B.
- Liley, Betsy (March 15, 1992). "Mayor's Duties Surge After Flood". Burlington Free Press. Burlington, VT. p. 9.
- "Washington Senate: Spaulding Doyle Top Lively Race". Burlington Free Press. Burlington, VT. November 9, 1994. p. 10B.
- "Senate Winners: Washington". Burlington Free Press. Burlington, VT. Associated Press. November 10, 1994. p. 4B.
- "Town Meeting 1996: Washington County; Montpelier". Burlington Free Press. Burlington, VT. March 6, 1996. p. 8B.
- "Legislative Directory: Ann Cummings". VT Digger. Montpelier, VT. 2017.
- Johnson, Mark (January 6, 2017). "Cummings to chair Senate Finance". VT Digger. Montpelier, VT.
