= Caledonia (Vermont Senate district) =

District of Vermont Senate

Coordinates: 44.70°N 73.32°W

The Caledonia district is one of 16 districts of the Vermont Senate. The current district plan is included in the redistricting and reapportionment plan developed by the Vermont General Assembly following the 2020 U.S. census, which applies to legislatures elected in 2022, 2024, 2026, 2028, and 2030.

The Caledonia district includes most of Caledonia County, and the Town of Newbury from Orange County.

== District senators ==
As of 2023

- Jane Kitchel, Democrat

As of 2010

- Joe Benning, Republican
- Jane Kitchel, Democrat

== Towns in the Caledonia district ==
=== Caledonia County ===
- Barnet
- Danville
- Groton
- Hardwick
- Peacham
- Ryegate
- St. Johnsbury
- Stannard
- Walden
- Waterford
- Wheelock

=== Orange County ===
- Newbury

== See also ==
- Vermont Senate
