= Washington (Vermont Senate district) =

The Washington district is one of 16 Vermont Senate districts included in the redistricting and reapportionment plan developed by the Vermont General Assembly following the 2020 U.S. census.

The Washington district includes all of Washington County, along with the towns of Orange, Braintree, and Stowe.

== District senators ==
- Ann Cummings, Democrat
- Andrew Perchlik, Democrat/Progressive
- Anne Watson, Democrat/Progressive

== Towns and cities in the Washington district ==
=== Washington County ===
- Barre
- Barre Town
- Berlin
- Cabot
- Calais
- Duxbury
- East Montpelier
- Fayston
- Marshfield
- Middlesex
- Montpelier
- Moretown
- Northfield
- Plainfield
- Roxbury
- Waitsfield
- Warren
- Waterbury
- Woodbury
- Worcester

=== Other ===
- Braintree, Orange County
- Orange, Orange County
- Stowe, Lamoille County
