= Vermont Senate =

Upper house of the Vermont General Assembly

Coordinates: 44°15′44″N 72°34′51″W

Vermont State Senate
- Vermont General Assembly

Type
- Type: Upper house
- Term limits: None

History
- New session started: January 8, 2025

Leadership
- President: John S. Rodgers (R) since January 9, 2025
- President pro tempore: Philip Baruth (D) since January 4, 2023
- Majority Leader: Kesha Ram Hinsdale (D) since January 8, 2025
- Minority Leader: Scott Beck (R) since January 8, 2025

Structure
- Seats: 30
- Political groups: Majority (17): Democratic (16); Progressive (1); Minority (13): Republican (13)
- Length of term: 2 years
- Authority: Section 7, Legislative Department, Constitution of Vermont
- Salary: $733.04 per week plus per diem during session

Elections
- Last election: November 5, 2024
- Next election: November 3, 2026
- Redistricting: Legislative control

Meeting place
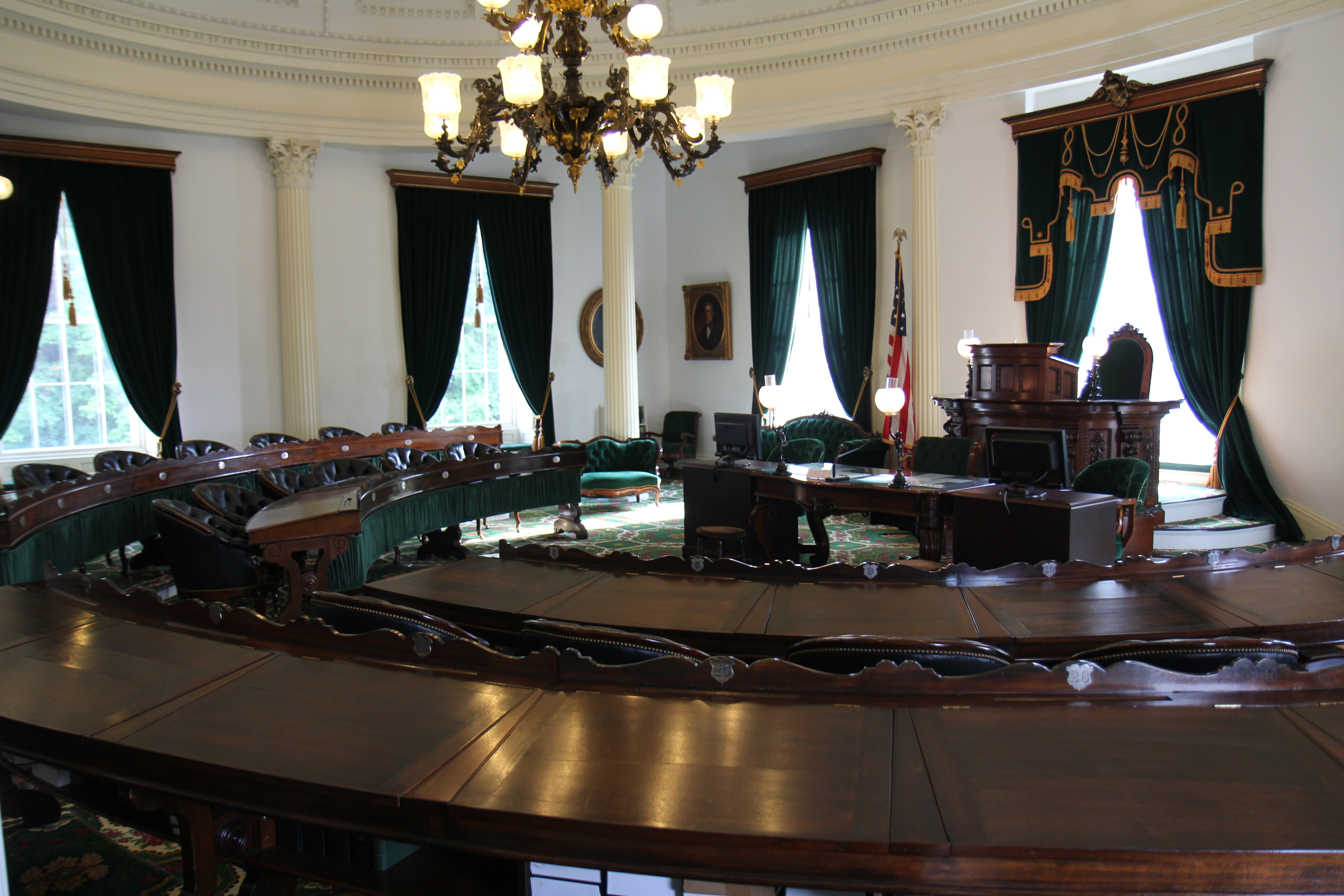
- State Senate Chamber, Vermont State House; Montpelier, Vermont, U.S.

Website
- Vermont State Senate

The Vermont Senate is the upper house of the Vermont General Assembly, the state legislature of the U.S. state of Vermont. The senate consists of 30 members elected from multi-member districts. Each senator represents at least 20,300 citizens. Senators are elected to two-year terms and there is no limit to the number of terms a senator may serve.

As in other upper houses of state and territorial legislatures and the U.S. Senate, the Vermont Senate has special functions, such as confirming or rejecting gubernatorial appointments to executive departments, the state cabinet, commissions, boards, and (for the first six-year term) the state's judiciary.

The Vermont Senate meets at the Vermont State House in the state capital of Montpelier.

== Districting and terms ==
The 30 senators are elected from 16 single- and multi-member senate districts. The districts largely correspond to the boundaries of the state's 14 counties with adjustments to ensure equality of representation. Each district elects between 1 and 3 senators at-large depending on population. For the 2023–2033 districts, seven districts elect one senator each, four districts elect two each, and five districts elect three each. Senators in multi-member districts are elected at-large throughout the district. Vermont is the only state to have any senate districts represented by more than two senators each, as well as the only state to employ bloc voting for senate elections.

Vermont is one of the 14 states where the upper house of its state legislature serves non-staggered, two-year terms, rather than the more common four-year term. There are no term limits. The governor is empowered to fill legislative vacancies; the party of the previous holder of the seat almost always recommends candidates, and the governor usually chooses an appointee from that list, though this process is a tradition and not legally required.

== Leadership ==
The lieutenant governor of Vermont serves as the president of the Senate, but casts a vote only if required to break a tie. In the absence of the lieutenant governor, the president pro tempore presides over the Senate. The president pro tempore is elected by the majority party caucus followed by confirmation from the entire body through a Senate resolution, and is the Senate's chief leadership position. The majority and minority leaders are elected by their respective party caucuses.

Committee assignments are determined by the Committee on Committees. This panel consists of the lieutenant governor, the president pro tempore and one member chosen by the full Senate. From 1997 to 2024 the third member of the committee was Richard Mazza. As of 2025, the third member is Ginny Lyons.

== Composition of the Senate (2025–2027 legislative session) ==
Affiliation	Party (shading indicates majority caucus)			Total	Vacant
Affiliation	Democratic	Progressive	Republican	Total	Vacant
End 2012	21	1	8	30	0
2013-2014	20	2	7	30	0
Begin 2015	19	3	9	30	0
End 2016	19	3	8	29	1 (Note: Republican Norman H. McAllister (Alburgh-Franklin) was suspended from senatorial duties in 2015 through the end of his Senate term.)
2017-2018	21	2	7	30	0
Begin 2019	22	2	6	30	0
Begin 2021	21	2	7	30	0
Begin 2023	22	1	7	30	0
Begin 2025	16	1	13	30	0
October 22, 2025	16	1	12	29	1
November 14, 2025	16	1	11	28	2
December 5, 2025	16	1	12	29	1
January 2, 2026	16	1	13	30	0
Latest voting share	56.7%		43.3%		

=== Current leadership ===
Position	Name	Party	Residence	District
President	John Rodgers	Rep	Glover	–
President pro tempore	Philip Baruth	Dem/Prog	Burlington	Chittenden-Central
Majority Leader	Kesha Ram Hinsdale	Dem	Shelburne	Chittenden-Southeast
Assistant Majority Leader (Whip)	Rebecca White	Dem	Hartford	Windsor
Minority Leader	Scott Beck	Rep	St. Johnsbury	Caledonia
Assistant Minority Leader (Whip)	Brian Collamore	Rep	Rutland	Rutland

=== Current members ===
District	Name	Party	Residence	Start
Addison	Steven Heffernan	Rep	Bristol	2024
Addison	Ruth Hardy	Dem	East Middlebury	2018
Bennington	Seth Bongartz (Note: Bongartz previously served in the state senate from 1987–1989.)	Dem	Manchester	2024
Bennington	Robert Plunkett	Dem	Bennington	2024
Caledonia	Scott Beck	Rep	St. Johnsbury	2024
Chittenden-Central	Philip Baruth	Dem/Prog	Burlington	2010
Chittenden-Central	Martine Gulick	Dem	Burlington	2022
Chittenden-Central	Tanya Vyhovsky	Prog/Dem	Essex	2022
Chittenden-North	Chris Mattos	Rep	Milton	2024
Chittenden-Southeast	Thomas Chittenden	Dem	South Burlington	2020
Chittenden-Southeast	Virginia V. Lyons	Dem	Williston	2000
Chittenden-Southeast	Kesha Ram Hinsdale	Dem	Shelburne	2020
Essex	Russ Ingalls	Rep	Newport	2020
Franklin	Randy Brock (Note: Brock previously served in the state senate from 2009–2013.)	Rep	Swanton	2017 (Note: Originally appointed.)
Franklin	Robert Norris	Rep	Sheldon	2022
Grand Isle	Patrick Brennan	Rep	Colchester	2024
Lamoille	Richard A. Westman	Rep	Hyde Park	2010
Orange	John Benson	Rep	Brookfield	2026
Orleans	John Morley	Rep	Orleans	2025
Rutland	Brian Collamore	Rep	Rutland Town	2014
Rutland	Dave Weeks	Rep	Proctor	2022
Rutland	Terry Williams	Rep	Poultney	2022
Washington	Ann Cummings	Dem	Montpelier	1996
Washington	Andrew Perchlik	Dem/Prog	Montpelier	2018
Washington	Anne Watson	Dem/Prog	Montpelier	2022
Windham	Wendy Harrison	Dem	Brattleboro	2022
Windham	Nader Hashim	Dem	Dummerston	2022
Windsor	Alison H. Clarkson	Dem	Woodstock	2016
Windsor	Joe Major	Dem	Hartford	2024
Windsor	Rebecca White	Dem	Hartford	2022

== Operations ==
The full Senate meets Tuesday and Friday mornings only for the first seven weeks of the annual session.

The Vermont Senate is aided by a small administrative staff, including the secretary of the Vermont Senate and several assistants. Since 2011, the Senate secretary has been John H. Bloomer, a former member of the Senate. Previous secretaries include Ernest W. Gibson Jr., Murdock A. Campbell, and Franklin S. Billings Jr.

Secretaries of the Vermont Senate since 1836 include:

- Norman Williams, 1836–1840
- DeWitt C. Clarke, 1840–1851
- Samuel M. Conant, 1851–1853
- Joseph H. Barrett, 1853–1855
- Clark H. Chapman, 1855–1859
- Carlisle J. Gleason, 1859–1861
- Henry Clary, 1861–1872
- Mason B. Carpenter, 1872–1874
- Frederick W. Baldwin, 1874–1880
- Chauncey W. Brownell Jr., 1880–1890
- George M. Powers, 1890–1896
- Max L. Powell, 1896–1902
- Walter K. Farnsworth, 1902–1908
- Homer L. Skeels, 1908–1915
- Guy M. Page, 1915–1921
- Millward C. Taft, 1921–1931
- Murdock A. Campbell, 1931–1933
- Ernest W. Gibson Jr., 1933–1940
- Willsie E. Brisbin, 1940–1948
- Natt L. Divoll Jr., 1949–1955
- Earle J. Bishop, 1955–1957
- Franklin S. Billings Jr., 1957–1959
- Earle J. Bishop, 1959–1963
- Robert Grussing III, 1963–1966
- Robert H. Gibson, 1967–2000
- David A. Gibson, 2000–2010
- John H. Bloomer Jr., 2010–Present

== History ==
Vermont originally had a unicameral legislature; most of the functions normally performed by an upper legislative house were the responsibility of the governor and council. The state abolished the governor's council and added a senate via an 1836 constitutional amendment.

The longest-serving member of the Vermont Senate was William T. Doyle; he was elected in 1968, reelected every two years until 2014, and defeated for reelection in 2016. Doyle served from January 1969 to January 2017; no other legislator in Vermont history—member of the Vermont House, member of the Vermont Senate, or member of both the House and Senate—has served longer than Doyle.

=== Former districts, 2002–2022 ===
The following is from the Vermont Secretary of State.

District	Senators
Addison	2
Bennington	2
Caledonia	2
Chittenden	6
Essex-Orleans	2
Franklin	2
Grand Isle	1
Lamoille	1
Orange	1
Rutland	3
Washington	3
Windham	2
Windsor	3

== Notable members ==
For more than 100 years from the 1850s to the 1960s, the Vermont Republican Party won every election for statewide office. In addition, the state legislature frequently included few or even no Democrats. For example, in 1878, the State Senate was made up of 30 Republicans and no Democrats, while the State House of 246 included 227 Republicans and 14 Democrats, with five towns unrepresented. In keeping with the "Mountain Rule", which was created to ensure party unity, governors and lieutenant governors were from opposite sides of the Green Mountains, and were limited to two years in office. Candidates for these offices were agreed upon by Republican leaders years in advance, and were often chosen for leadership positions in the House or Senate to groom them for statewide office.

=== Governors ===
Most individuals who have served as governor or lieutenant governor had experience in the Vermont legislature; many served in the State Senate. Governors who served in the Vermont Senate include:

William A. Palmer (post-governorship); Horace Eaton; Carlos Coolidge (post-governorship); John S. Robinson; Frederick Holbrook; Paul Dillingham; George Whitman Hendee; John Wolcott Stewart; Julius Converse; Horace Fairbanks; Redfield Proctor; Roswell Farnham; John L. Barstow; Ebenezer J. Ormsbee; William P. Dillingham; Carroll S. Page; Levi K. Fuller; Josiah Grout; John G. McCullough; Charles J. Bell; Fletcher D. Proctor; George H. Prouty; John A. Mead; Allen M. Fletcher; Charles W. Gates; Percival W. Clement; Redfield Proctor Jr.; John E. Weeks; Stanley C. Wilson; Charles Manley Smith; William H. Wills; Mortimer R. Proctor; Lee E. Emerson; Joseph B. Johnson; Philip H. Hoff (post-governorship); Peter Shumlin; and Phil Scott (incumbent).

=== Lieutenant governors ===
Vermont's lieutenant governors who served in the state senate include:

Waitstill R. Ranney, Leonard Sargeant, William C. Kittredge, Jefferson P. Kidder, Burnham Martin, Levi Underwood, Abraham B. Gardner, Stephen Thomas, George N. Dale, Russell S. Taft, Lyman G. Hinckley, Eben Pomeroy Colton, Henry A. Fletcher, Farrand Stewart Stranahan, Zophar Mansur, Nelson W. Fisk, Henry C. Bates, Martin F. Allen, Zed S. Stanton, Charles H. Stearns, Leighton P. Slack, Hale K. Darling, Roger W. Hulburd, Abram W. Foote, Walter K. Farnsworth, Consuelo N. Bailey, Robert S. Babcock, T. Garry Buckley, Barbara Snelling (post-lieutenant governorship), Doug Racine, David Zuckerman, and John S. Rodgers (incumbent).

=== Members of Congress ===
Many of Vermont's members of the United States Senate and United States House of Representatives also served in the Vermont Senate.

U.S. senators include Samuel S. Phelps, George F. Edmunds, Jonathan Ross, Porter H. Dale, Frank C. Partridge, Ernest Willard Gibson, Jim Jeffords, and Peter Welch (incumbent).

U.S. House members who served in the Vermont Senate include William Henry, Ahiman Louis Miner, George Tisdale Hodges, Frederick E. Woodbridge, H. Henry Powers, David J. Foster, William Hebard, Andrew Tracy, William W. Grout, Kittredge Haskins, Frank Plumley, Alvah Sabin, Homer Elihu Royce, Worthington Curtis Smith, Bradley Barlow, Augustus Young, Richard W. Mallary, Peter Plympton Smith, and Becca Balint (incumbent).

=== Other notable members ===
Other notable members of the Vermont Senate include:

- James Barrett (1844–1845), Associate Justice of the Vermont Supreme Court
- Edna Beard (1923–1925): Vermont's first female state House member (1921 to 1923) and first female state senator; also the first woman to hold a leadership position in the Vermont legislature as Chair of the Senate Committee on Libraries.
- William Carris (2007–2013), businessman who served as president of Carris Reels (later Carris Financial)
- Lucius E. Chittenden (1856–1860): author and government official.
- George W. F. Cook (1959–1969): United States Attorney for Vermont
- William H. Gilmore (1882–1883): Adjutant general of the Vermont Militia.
- Daniel Kellogg (1865–1866): Adjutant general of the Vermont Militia.
- James L. Oakes (1961–1965): judge of the U.S. District Court for Vermont and judge of the U.S. Court of Appeals for the Second Circuit.
- William Wells (1886–1887): recipient of the Medal of Honor during the American Civil War.
- Hoyt Henry Wheeler (1868–1869): judge of the United States District Court for the District of Vermont.

== See also ==
- President pro tempore of the Vermont Senate
- Vermont State House
- Vermont General Assembly
- Vermont House of Representatives
- Members of the Vermont Senate, 2005-2006 session
- Members of the Vermont Senate, 2007-2008 session
- List of Vermont General Assemblies
