= 2022 Vermont Senate election =

- November 8, 2022

All 30 seats in the Vermont Senate 16 seats needed for a majority
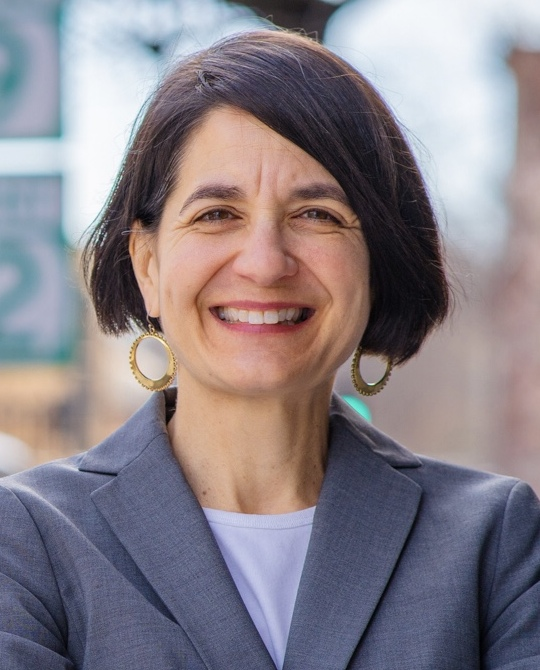

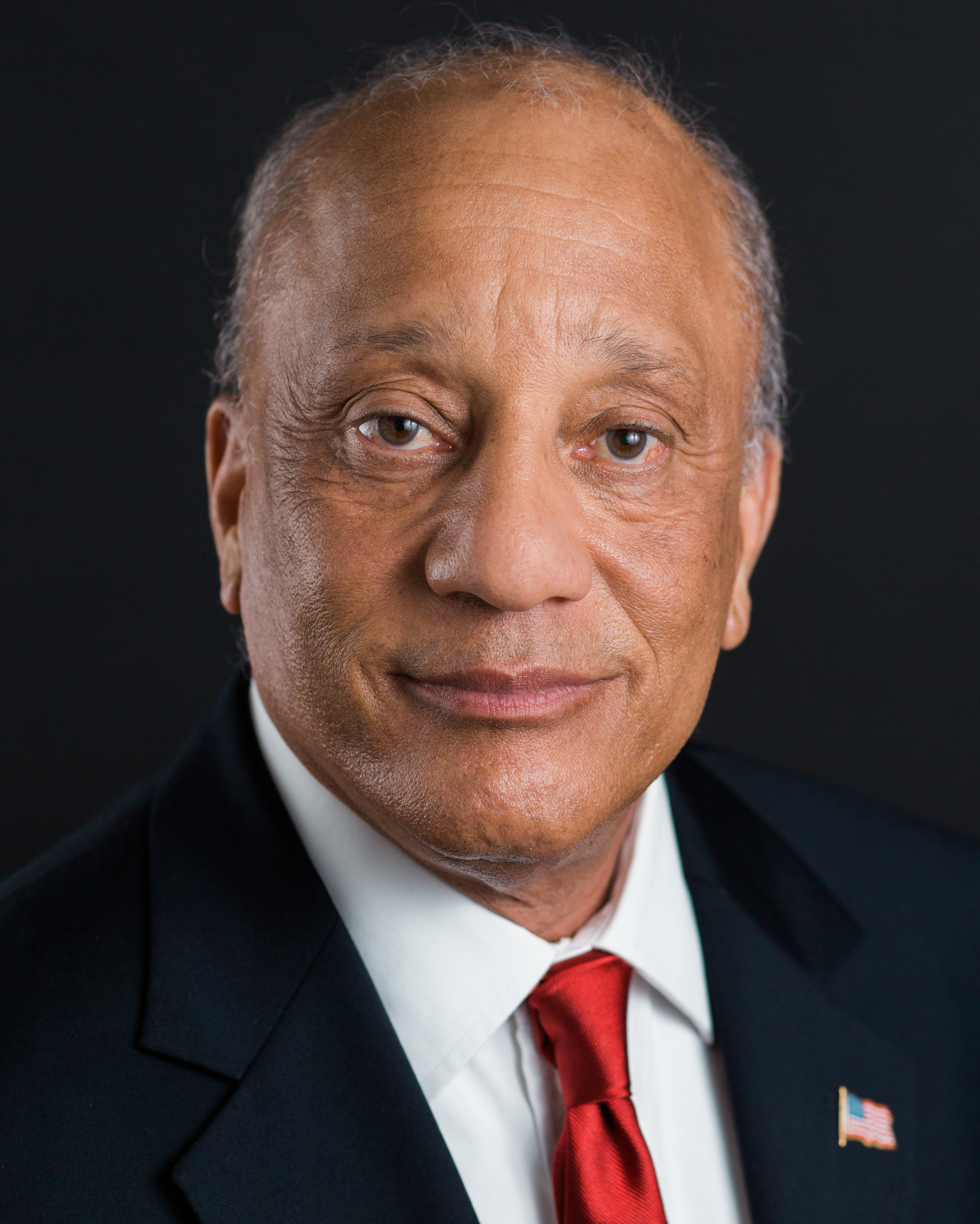

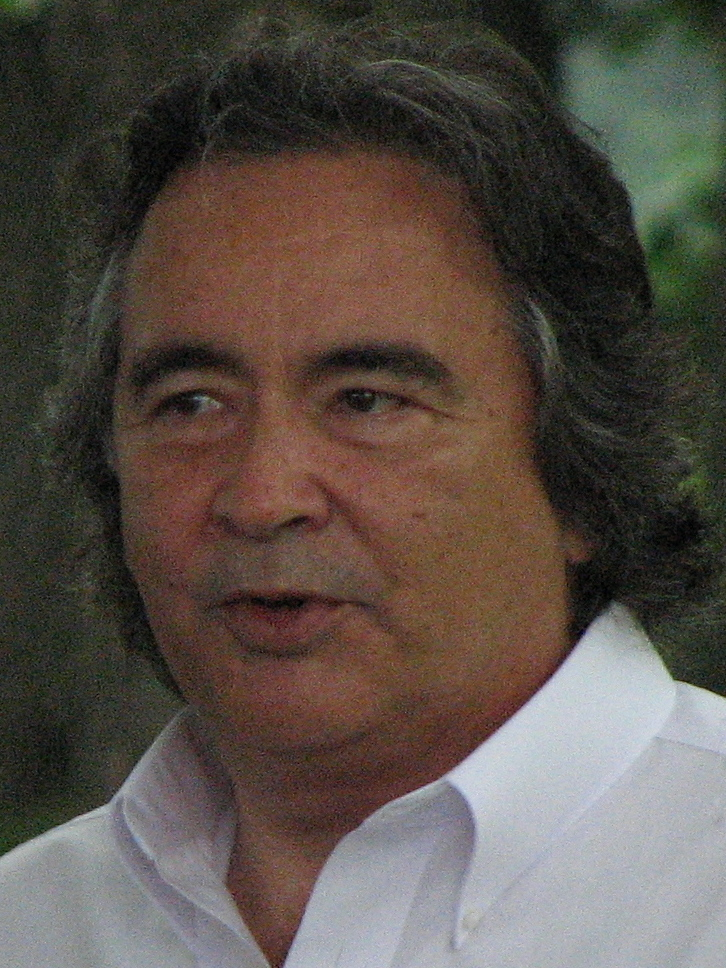
	Majority party	Minority party	Third party
Leader	Becca Balint (retired)	Randy Brock	Anthony Pollina (retired)
Party	Democratic	Republican	Progressive
Leader since	January 6, 2021	January 6, 2021	2013
Leader's seat	Windham	Franklin	Washington
Last election	21 seats, 53.7%	7 seats, 34.7%	2 seats, 6.3%
Seats before	21	7	2
Seats won	22	7	1
Seat change	▲1	Steady	▼1
Popular vote	365,882	165,921	12,377
Percentage	65.1%	29.5%	2.2%
- Results: Democratic gain Republican gain Democratic hold Republican hold Progressive hold
President pro tempore before election
Becca Balint
Democratic
Elected President pro tempore
Phil Baruth
Democratic/Progressive

The 2022 Vermont Senate election took place on November 8, 2022, as part of the biennial United States elections. The election coincided with elections for other offices including the U.S. Senate, U.S. House, Governor, and State House. Vermont voters elected all 30 state senators from 16 districts, with each district electing between one and three senators. State senators serve two-year terms in the Vermont Senate. Primary elections were held on August 9, 2022. This election would be the first to use new districts adopted by the Vermont General Assembly to allocate for population changes across the state after the 2020 census.

Democrats and Progressives retained their combined 23-seat supermajority. Because Democrats and Progressives simultaneously won a supermajority in the Vermont House of Representatives for the first time ever, this meant that they could pass bills that were vetoed by Republican governor Phil Scott. Republicans lost one seat during redistricting, as Joe Benning's Caledonia County seat was eliminated, but they made up for this loss by gaining a seat from Democrats in Rutland County. Democrats still managed a net gain of one seat, as they won the newly created Chittenden North district and gained a seat from Progressives in Washington County. This left newly elected senator Tanya Vyhovsky as the only Progressive in the Senate, although four of the elected Democrats were also nominated by the Progressive Party and appeared on the ballot as "Democratic/Progressive."

== Predictions ==
Source	Ranking	As of
Sabato's Crystal Ball	Safe D	May 19, 2022

== Results ==
Party	Candidates		Votes	%	Primary seats			Secondary seats		
Party	Primary	Secondary	Votes	%	Before	After	+/−	Before	After	+/−
Democratic	27	3	365,882	65.1	21 (Note: In the 2020 election, 21 of the elected senators were primarily Democrats. However, 5 of the elected senators were primarily affiliated with a different party but were also nominated by the Democratic Party and listed "Democratic" on the ballot as a secondary nomination.)	22	+1	5	3	-2
Republican	24	1	165,921	29.5	7 (Note: In the 2020 election, 7 of the elected senators were primarily Republicans. However, 2 of the elected senators were primarily affiliated with a different party but were also nominated by the Republican Party and listed "Republican" on the ballot as a secondary nomination.)	7	–	2	1	-1
Progressive	1	4	12,377	2.2	2 (Note: In the 2020 election, 2 of the elected senators were primarily Progressives. However, 3 of the elected senators were primarily affiliated with a different party but were also nominated by the Progressive Party and listed "Progressive" on the ballot as a secondary nomination.)	1	-1	3	4	+1
Libertarian	0	1	N/A		0	0	–	0	0	–
Independent	4	0	10,886	1.9	0	0	–	0	0	–
Write-ins	N/A		7,021	1.2	N/A					
Total	56	9	562,087	100.0	30	30	±0	10	8	-2

District	Incumbent	Party	District	Elected senator	Party
Addison	Christopher Bray	Dem	Addison	Christopher Bray	Dem
Addison	Ruth Hardy	Dem	Addison	Ruth Hardy	Dem
Bennington	Dick Sears	Dem	Bennington	Dick Sears	Dem/Rep
Bennington	Brian Campion	Dem	Bennington	Brian Campion	Dem
Caledonia	Jane Kitchel	Dem	Caledonia	Jane Kitchel	Dem
Caledonia	Joe Benning	Rep	Caledonia	Seat abolished	
Chittenden	Phil Baruth	Dem/Prog	Chittenden Central	Phil Baruth	Dem/Prog
Chittenden	New seat		Chittenden Central	Martine Gulick	Dem
Chittenden	Christopher Pearson	Prog/Dem	Chittenden Central	Tanya Vyhovsky	Prog/Dem
Chittenden	New seat		Chittenden North	Irene Wrenner	Dem
Chittenden	Kesha Ram Hinsdale	Dem	Chittenden Southeast	Kesha Ram Hinsdale	Dem/Prog
Chittenden	Thomas Chittenden	Dem	Chittenden Southeast	Thomas Chittenden	Dem
Chittenden	Ginny Lyons	Dem	Chittenden Southeast	Ginny Lyons	Dem
Chittenden	Michael Sirotkin	Dem	Chittenden Southeast	Seat abolished	
Essex-Orleans	Russ Ingalls	Rep	Essex	Russ Ingalls	Rep/Dem
Essex-Orleans	Robert Starr	Dem	Orleans	Robert Starr	Dem
Franklin	Randy Brock	Rep/Dem	Franklin	Randy Brock	Rep
Franklin	Corey Parent	Rep/Dem	Franklin	Robert Norris	Rep
Grand Isle	Richard Mazza	Dem/Rep	Grand Isle	Richard Mazza	Dem
Lamoille	Richard Westman	Rep/Dem	Lamoille	Richard Westman	Rep/Dem
Orange	Mark MacDonald	Dem	Orange	Mark MacDonald	Dem
Rutland	Brian Collamore	Rep	Rutland	Brian Collamore	Rep
Rutland	Joshua Terenzini	Rep	Rutland	Terry Williams	Rep
Rutland	Cheryl Hooker	Dem/Prog	Rutland	Dave Weeks	Rep
Washington	Ann Cummings	Dem	Washington	Ann Cummings	Dem
Washington	Anthony Pollina	Prog/Dem	Washington	Anne Watson	Dem/Prog
Washington	Andrew Perchlik	Dem/Prog	Washington	Andrew Perchlik	Dem/Prog
Windham	Becca Balint	Dem	Windham	Wendy Harrison	Dem
Windham	Jeanette White	Dem	Windham	Nader Hashim	Dem
Windsor	Alison Clarkson	Dem	Windsor	Alison Clarkson	Dem
Windsor	Alice Nitka	Dem	Windsor	Rebecca White	Dem
Windsor	Richard McCormack	Dem	Windsor	Richard McCormack	Dem

== Retiring incumbents ==
Ten incumbent senators (five Democrats, three Republicans and both Progressives) had announced they would not seek reelection.

1. Caledonia: Joe Benning (R) (ran for lieutenant governor)
2. Chittenden: Christopher Pearson (P/D)
3. Chittenden: Michael Sirotkin (D)
4. Franklin: Corey Parent (R)
5. Rutland: Joshua Terenzini (R)
6. Rutland: Cheryl Hooker (D/P)
7. Washington: Anthony Pollina (P/D)
8. Windham: Becca Balint (D) (ran for U.S. House)
9. Windham: Jeanette White (D)
10. Windsor: Alice Nitka (D)

== Leadership selection ==
With incumbent Democratic president pro tempore Becca Balint retiring to run for U.S. House, Democrats had to nominate a new candidate who would take the position in the event they retained their majority. Ahead of the November 13 leadership vote, Philip Baruth of Chittenden was running unopposed. Andrew Perchlik of Washington had expressed interest in running but decided against it, and told VTDigger that the president pro tempore election was "not much of a race." Kesha Ram Hinsdale of Chittenden and Senate Majority Leader Alison Clarkson of Windsor, who had been speculated as potential candidates by media, both said they would not run and endorsed Baruth's bid. Democrats retained their Senate majority and Baruth was unanimously elected as the new president pro tempore, becoming the second president pro tempore to caucus with both Democrats and Progressives after Tim Ashe. Additionally, Clarkson was reelected as Majority Leader and Perchlik was elected Majority Whip, succeeding the retiring Cheryl Hooker.

== Detailed results ==
=== Addison ===
Addison district
- November 8, 2022
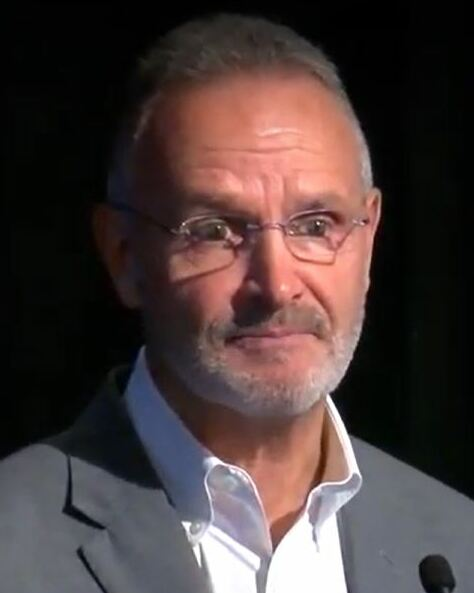

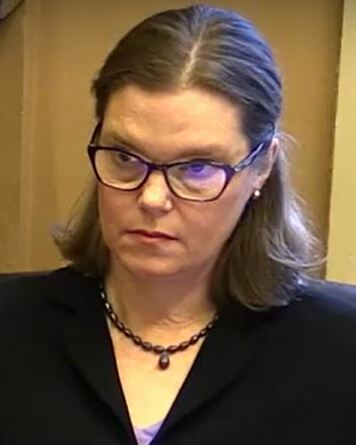
Nominee	Christopher Bray	Ruth Hardy
Party	Democratic	Democratic
Popular vote	11,898	11,732
Percentage	33.8%	33.3%
Nominee	Robert Burton	Lloyd Dike
Party	Republican	Republican
Popular vote	5766	4951
Percentage	16.4%	14.0%
Senators before election
Christopher Bray (Dem)
Ruth Hardy (Dem)
Elected Senators
Christopher Bray (Dem)
Ruth Hardy (Dem)

- Elects two senators.

Incumbent Democrats Ruth Hardy, who had represented the district since 2019, and Christopher Bray, who had represented the district since 2013, both ran for re-election.

==== Democratic primary ====
- Christopher Bray, incumbent senator
- Ruth Hardy, incumbent senator

Addison Senate district Democratic primary election, 2022
Party	Candidate	Votes	%
Democratic	Ruth Hardy (incumbent)	6,291	52.0
Democratic	Christopher Bray (incumbent)	5,782	47.7
Write-in	Write-ins	37	0.3
Total votes		12,110	100.0

==== Republican primary ====
- Robert Burton, farmer and former U.S. Navy pilot (write-in)
- Lloyd Dike, nursing assistant and U.S. Army veteran (write-in)

Addison Senate district Republican primary election, 2022
Party	Candidate	Votes	%
Republican	Lloyd Dike (write-in)	131	26.6
Republican	Robert Burton (write-in)	61	12.4
Write-in	Other write-ins	301	61.0
Total votes		493	100.0

==== Independents ====
- Mason Wade, homesteader and candidate for this district in 2018 and 2020

==== General election ====
Addison Senate district general election, 2022
Party	Candidate	Votes	%
Democratic	Christopher Bray (incumbent)	11,898	33.8
Democratic	Ruth Hardy (incumbent)	11,732	33.3
Republican	Lloyd Dike	5,766	16.4
Republican	Robert Burton	4,951	14.0
Independent	Mason Wade	846	2.4
Write-in	Write-ins	54	0.1
Total votes		35,247	100.0
Democratic hold			
Democratic hold			

=== Bennington ===
Bennington district
- November 8, 2022
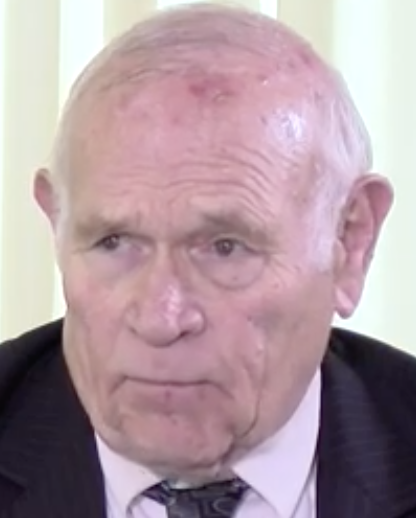

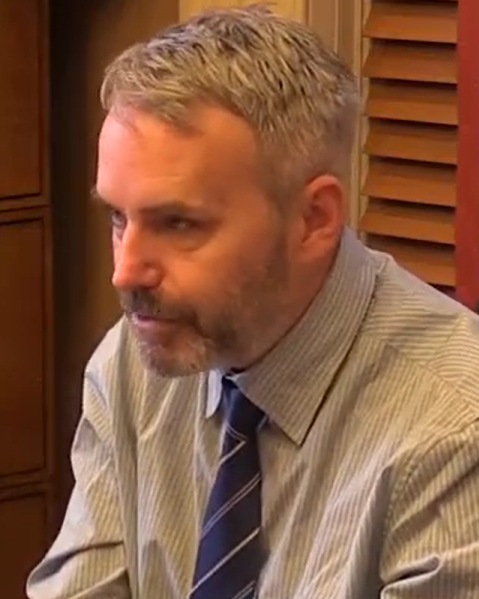
Nominee	Dick Sears	Brian Campion
Party	Democratic	Democratic
Alliance	Republican
Popular vote	12,181	11,326
Percentage	51.1%	47.6%
Senators before election
Dick Sears (Democratic)
Brian Campion (Democratic)
Elected Senators
Dick Sears (Dem/Rep)
Brian Campion (Democratic)

- Elects two senators.

Incumbent Democrats Dick Sears, who had represented the district since 1993, and Brian Campion, who had represented the district since 2015, both ran for re-election.

==== Democratic primary ====
- Brian Campion, incumbent senator
- Dick Sears, incumbent senator

Bennington Senate district Democratic primary election, 2022
Party	Candidate	Votes	%
Democratic	Dick Sears (incumbent)	4,436	50.4
Democratic	Brian Campion (incumbent)	4,327	49.2
Write-in	Write-ins	40	0.4
Total votes		8,803	100.0

==== Republican primary ====
Bennington Senate district Republican primary election, 2022
Party	Candidate	Votes	%
Republican	Dick Sears (incumbent) (write-in)	75	22.8
Republican	Brian Campion (incumbent) (write-in)	64	19.5
Write-in	Other write-ins	190	57.7
Total votes		329	100.0

==== General election ====
Bennington Senate district general election, 2022
Party	Candidate	Votes	%
Democratic/Republican	Dick Sears (incumbent) (Note: Candidate received the nominations of both the Democratic and Republican parties and will be listed on the ballot as "Democratic/Republican" (candidate is primarily a Democrat).)	12,181	51.1
Democratic	Brian Campion (incumbent) (Note: According to the official canvassing report this candidate was listed as having won the Republican nomination via write-in votes, but will be listed on the ballot as only the nominee of the Democratic Party, implying that they declined the Republican nomination.)	11,326	47.6
Write-in	Write-ins	310	1.3
Total votes		23,817	100.0
Democratic hold			
Democratic hold			

People who received three or more write-in votes include Gerald Malloy (7), Mary Morrissey (7), Christina Nolan (5), Donald Trump (5), and Ericka Redic (3).

=== Caledonia ===
Caledonia district
- November 8, 2022
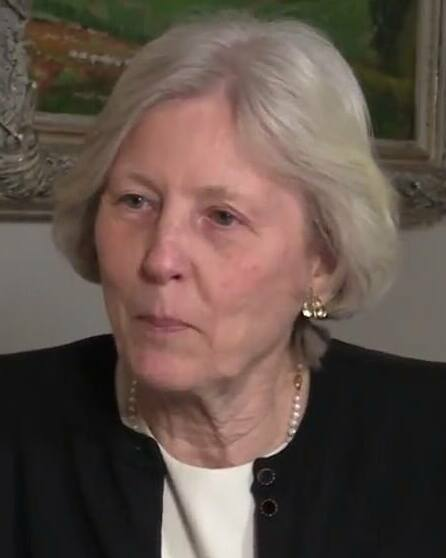

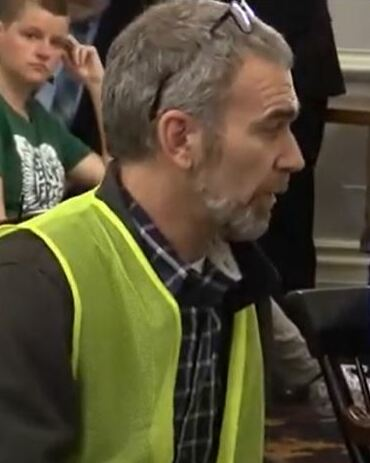
Nominee	Jane Kitchel	J.T. Dodge
Party	Democratic	Republican
Popular vote	6,210	3,565
Percentage	63.4%	36.4%
Senators before election
Jane Kitchel (Democratic)
Joe Benning (Republican)
Elected Senators
Jane Kitchel
Democratic

- Elects one senator.

Following statewide redistricting, the Caledonia district now only elects one senator instead of two. Incumbent Democrat Jane Kitchel, who had represented the district since 2005, ran for re-election. Incumbent Republican Joe Benning, who had represented the district since 2011, retired to run for lieutenant governor.

==== Democratic primary ====
- Jane Kitchel, incumbent senator

Caledonia Senate district Democratic primary, 2022
Party	Candidate	Votes	%
Democratic	Jane Kitchel (incumbent)	2,711	99.1
Write-in	Write-ins	25	0.9
Total votes		2,736	100.0

==== Republican primary ====
- J.T. Dodge, systems engineer, former vice chair of the Vermont Libertarian Party, and Libertarian nominee for this district in 2020

Caledonia Senate district Republican primary, 2022
Party	Candidate	Votes	%
Republican	J.T. Dodge	985	97.3
Write-in	Write-ins	27	2.7
Total votes		1,012	100.0

==== General election ====
Caledonia Senate district general election, 2022
Party	Candidate	Votes	%
Democratic	Jane Kitchel (incumbent)	6,210	63.4
Republican	J.T. Dodge	3,565	36.4
Write-in	Write-ins	17	0.2
Total votes		9,792	100.0
Democratic hold			
Republican loss (seat eliminated)			

=== Chittenden Central ===
Chittenden Central district
- November 8, 2022
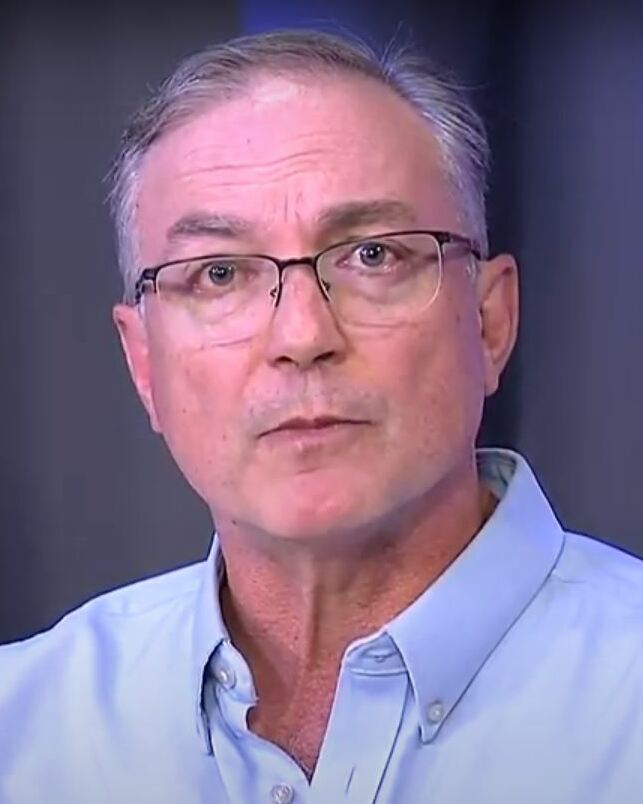

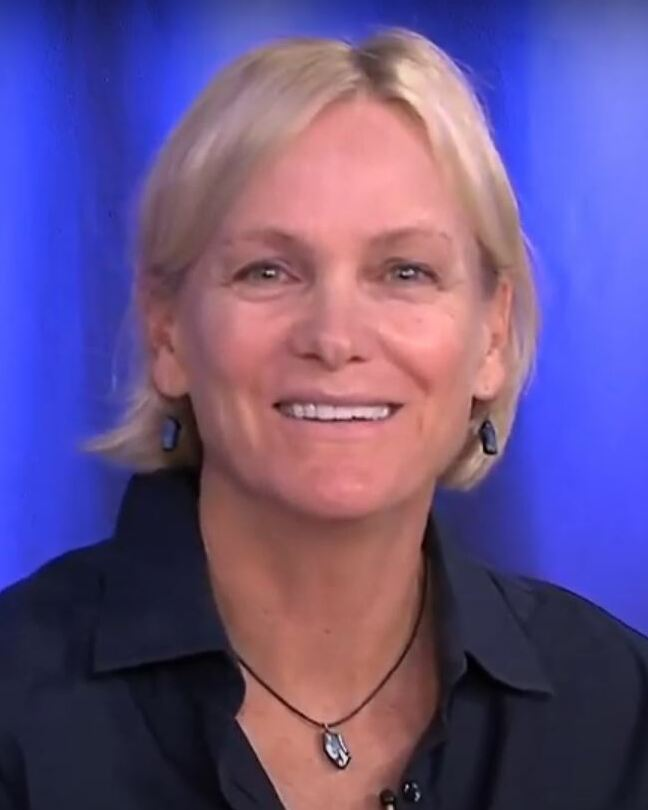

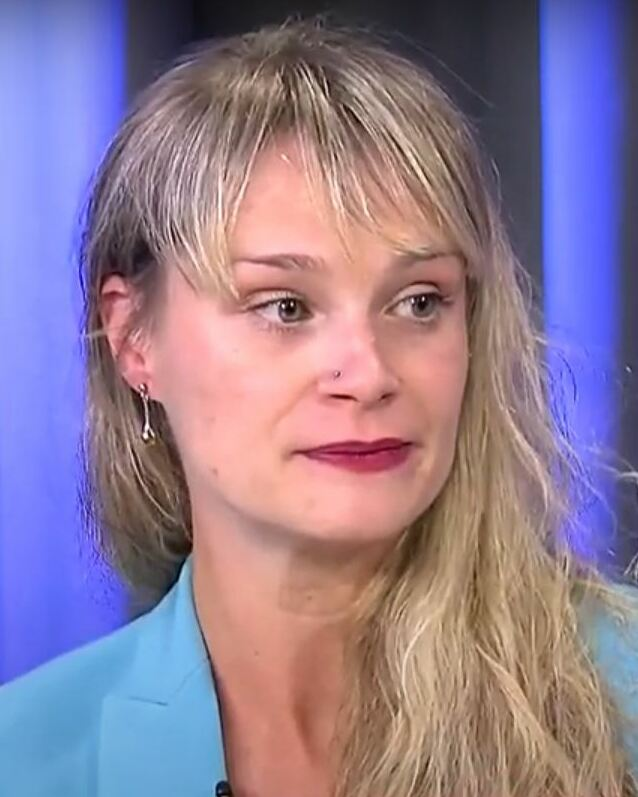

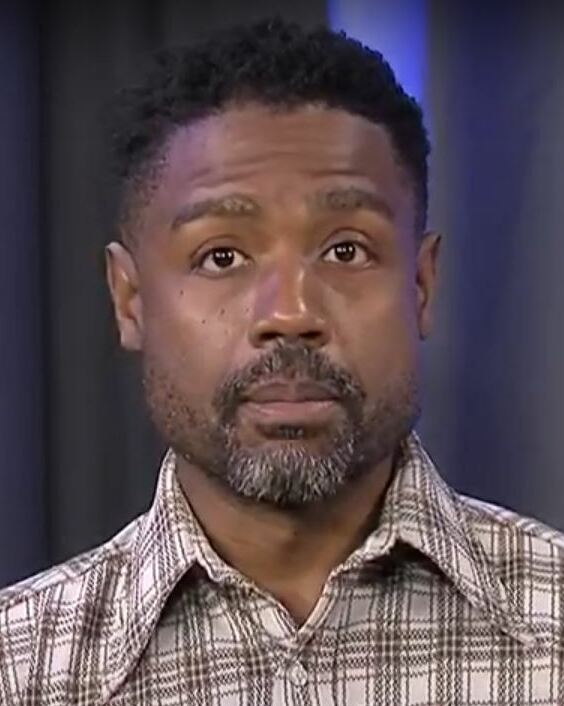
Nominee	Phil Baruth	Martine Gulick
Party	Democratic	Democratic
Alliance	Progressive
Popular vote	15,187	14,007
Percentage	31.5%	29.0%
Nominee	Tanya Vyhovsky	Infinite Culcleasure
Party	Progressive	Independent
Alliance	Democratic
Popular vote	12,377	5,327
Percentage	25.7%	11.0%
Senators before election
Phil Baruth (Democratic)
Christopher Pearson (Progressive)
Elected Senators
Phil Baruth (Dem/Prog)
Martine Gulick (Democratic)
Tanya Vyhovsky (Prog/Dem)

- Elects three senators.

Following statewide redistricting, the former Chittenden district, which elected six senators, was split up into three new districts: Chittenden Central, which elects three senators; Chittenden North, which elects one senator; and Chittenden Southeast, which elects three senators. Incumbent Democrat Phil Baruth, who had represented the Chittenden district since 2011, ran for re-election here. Incumbent Progressive Christopher Pearson, who had represented the Chittenden district since 2017, retired.

==== Democratic primary ====
- Phil Baruth, incumbent senator
- Andrew Brown, president of the Essex Junction Board of Trustees (withdrew, remained on ballot)
- Dawn Ellis, member of the Vermont Human Rights Commission and candidate for this district in 2014 and 2016
- Martine Gulick, Burlington school board member
- Erhard Mahnke, former president of the Burlington city council and candidate for this district in 2020
- Tanya Vyhovsky, state representative

Chittenden Central Senate district Democratic primary, 2022
Party	Candidate	Votes	%
Democratic	Phil Baruth (incumbent)	5,710	23.7
Democratic	Tanya Vyhovsky	5,140	21.3
Democratic	Martine Gulick	3,949	16.4
Democratic	Erhard Mahnke	3,947	16.4
Democratic	Dawn Ellis	3,329	13.8
Democratic	Andrew Brown (withdrawn)	1,941	8.1
Write-in	Write-ins	70	0.3
Total votes		24,086	100.0

==== Independents ====
- Infinite Culcleasure, community advocate and candidate for mayor of Burlington in 2018

==== General election ====
Chittenden general election, 2022
Party	Candidate	Votes	%
Democratic/Progressive	Phil Baruth (incumbent) (Note: Candidate received the nominations of both the Democratic and Progressive parties and will be listed on the ballot as "Democratic/Progressive" (candidate is primarily a Democrat).)	15,187	31.5
Democratic	Martine Gulick	14,007	29.0
Progressive/Democratic	Tanya Vyhovsky (Note: Candidate received the nominations of both the Progressive and Democratic parties and will be listed on the ballot as "Progressive/Democratic" (candidate is primarily a Progressive).)	12,377	25.7
Independent	Infinite Culcleasure	5,327	11.0
Write-in	Write-ins	717	1.5
Total votes		48,245	100.0
Democratic hold			
Democratic win (new seat)			
Progressive hold			

People who received three or more write-in votes include Kurt Wright (17), Erhard Mahnke (14), Irene Wrenner (14), Ericka Redic (11), Leland Morgan (6), Richard Mazza (5), Liam Madden (4), Miriam Berry (3), Gerald Malloy (3), and Thomas Chittenden (3).

=== Chittenden North ===
Chittenden North district
- November 8, 2022
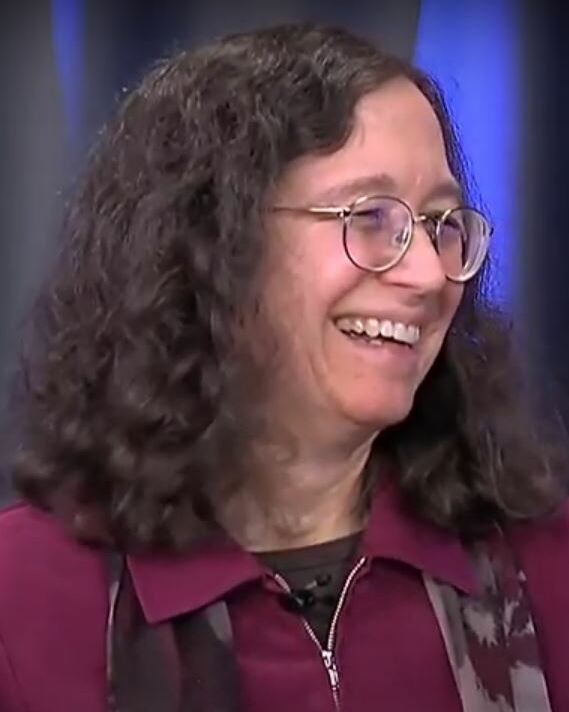

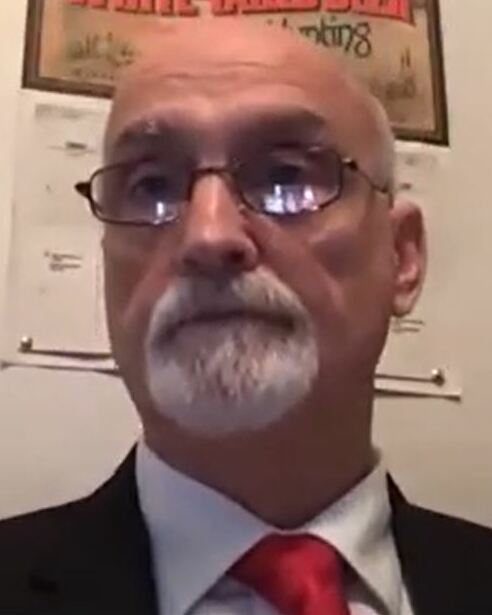
Nominee	Irene Wrenner	Leland Morgan
Party	Democratic	Republican
Popular vote	5,173	4,858
Percentage	51.3%	48.1%
Senator before election
None
Elected Senator
Irene Wrenner
Democratic

- Elects one senator.

Following statewide redistricting, the former Chittenden district, which elected six senators, was split up into three new districts: Chittenden Central, which elects three senators; Chittenden North, which elects one senator; and Chittenden Southeast, which elects three senators. The new Chittenden North district had no incumbent.

==== Democratic primary ====
- Brian Shelden, chair of Essex Democrats and former director of the Essex Economic Development Commission
- Irene Wrenner, journalist and former Essex selectman

Chittenden North Senate district Democratic primary, 2022
Party	Candidate	Votes	%
Democratic	Irene Wrenner	1,621	58.5
Democratic	Brian Shelden	1,136	41.0
Write-in	Write-ins	15	0.5
Total votes		2,772	100.0

==== Republican primary ====
- Leland Morgan, state representative

Chittenden North Senate district Republican primary, 2022
Party	Candidate	Votes	%
Republican	Leland Morgan	1,127	98.5
Write-in	Write-ins	17	1.5
Total votes		1,144	100.0

==== General election ====
Chittenden general election, 2022
Party	Candidate	Votes	%
Democratic	Irene Wrenner	5,173	51.3
Republican	Leland Morgan	4,858	48.1
Write-in	Write-ins	60	0.6
Total votes		10,091	100.0
Democratic win (new seat)			

Brian Shelden, the runner-up in the Democratic primary, received 21 write-in votes.

=== Chittenden Southeast ===
Chittenden Southeast district
- November 8, 2022
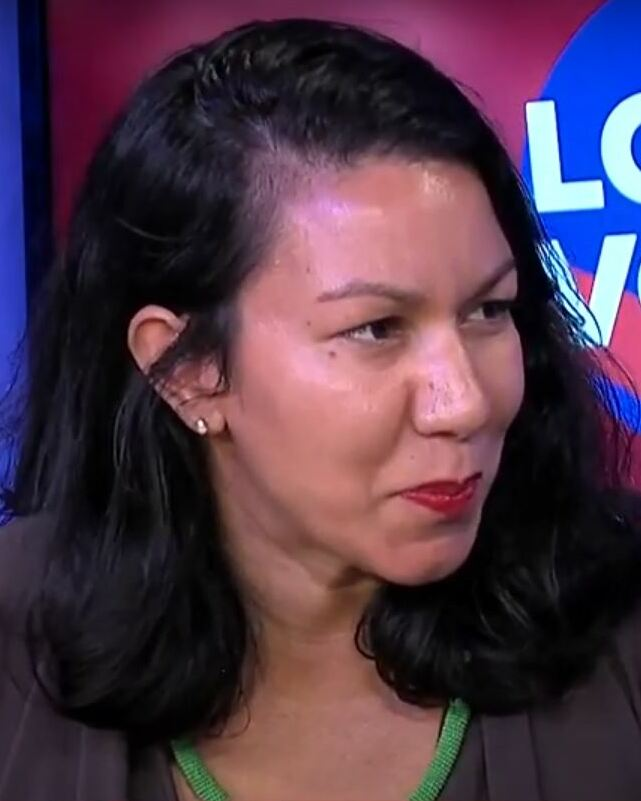

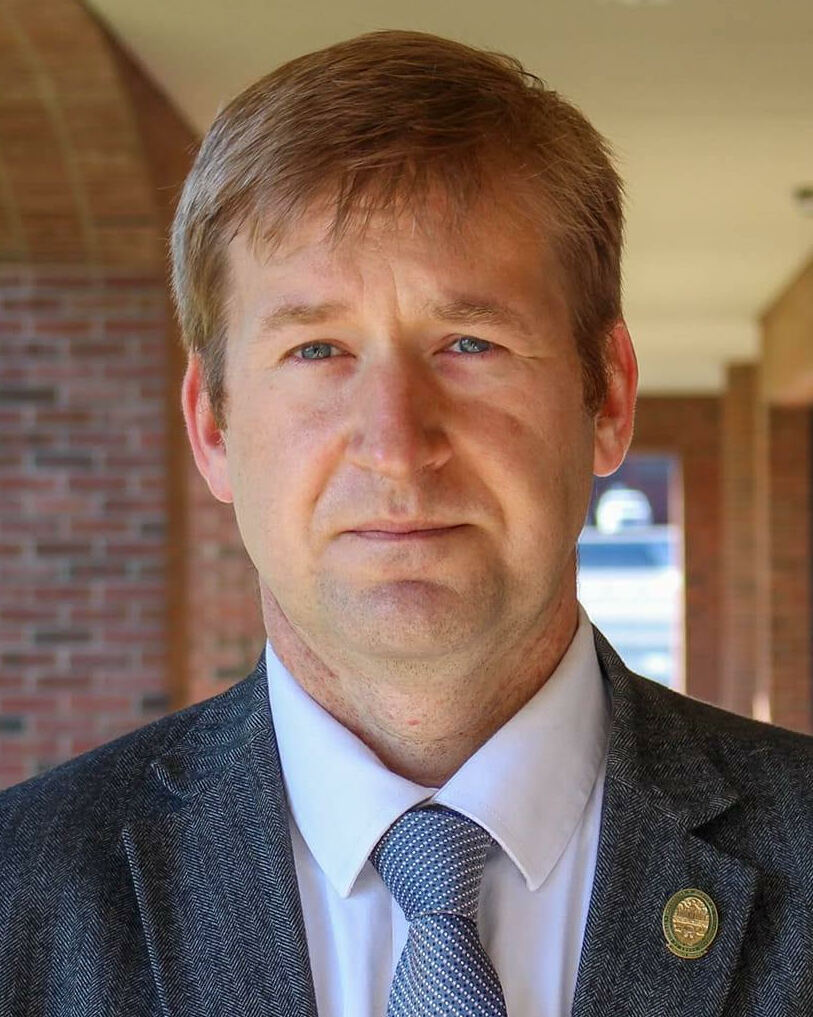

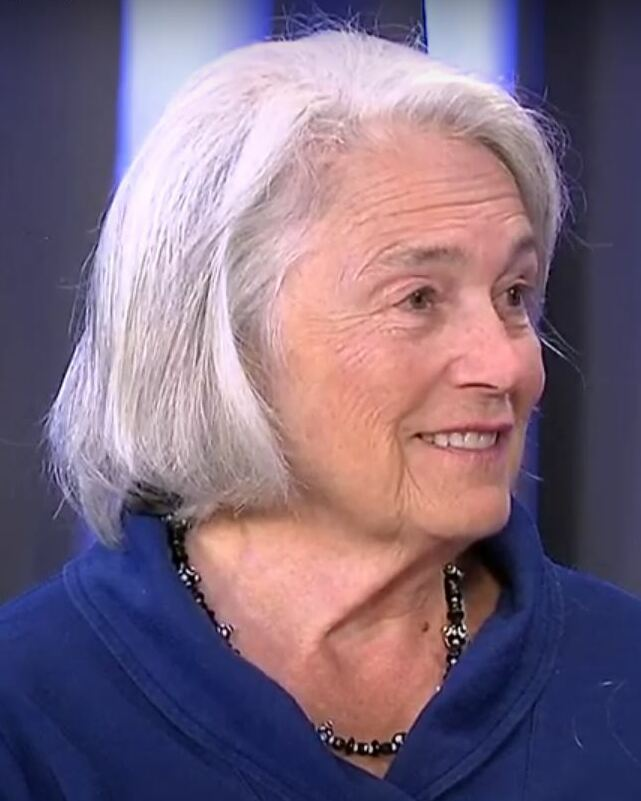
Nominee	Kesha Ram Hinsdale	Thomas Chittenden	Ginny Lyons
Party	Democratic	Democratic	Democratic
Alliance	Progressive
Popular vote	30,923	25,689	24,202
Percentage	32.1%	26.6%	25.1%
Nominee	Dean Rolland	Rohan St. Marthe
Party	Republican	Republican
Popular vote	8,537	6,853
Percentage	8.9%	7.1%
Senators before election
Kesha Ram Hinsdale (Democratic)
Thomas Chittenden (Democratic)
Ginny Lyons (Democratic)
Michael Sirotkin (Democratic)
Elected Senators
Kesha Ram Hinsdale (Dem/Prog)
Thomas Chittenden (Democratic)
Ginny Lyons (Democratic)

- Elects three senators.

Following statewide redistricting, the former Chittenden district, which elected six senators, was split up into three new districts: Chittenden Central, which elects three senators; Chittenden North, which elects one senator; and Chittenden Southeast, which elects three senators. Incumbent Democrats Thomas Chittenden and Kesha Ram Hinsdale, who had both represented the Chittenden district since 2021, and Ginny Lyons, who had represented the Chittenden district since 2001, all ran for re-election here. Incumbent Democrat Michael Sirotkin, who had represented the Chittenden district since 2014, retired.

==== Democratic primary ====
- Thomas Chittenden, incumbent senator
- Ginny Lyons, incumbent senator
- Steve May, social worker, former Richmond and Bolton selectman, and candidate for this district in 2018 and 2020
- Lewis Mudge, Charlotte selectman
- Kesha Ram Hinsdale, incumbent senator

Chittenden Southeast Senate district Democratic primary, 2022
Party	Candidate	Votes	%
Democratic	Ginny Lyons (incumbent)	12,501	29.4
Democratic	Kesha Ram Hinsdale (incumbent)	11,517	27.1
Democratic	Thomas Chittenden (incumbent)	10,996	25.8
Democratic	Lewis Mudge	4,668	11.0
Democratic	Steve May	2,801	6.6
Write-in	Write-ins	79	0.2
Total votes		42,562	100.0

==== Republican primary ====
Chittenden Southeast Senate district Republican primary, 2022
Party	Candidate	Votes	%
Republican	Thomas Chittenden (incumbent) (write-in)	66	16.8
Write-in	Other write-ins	326	83.2
Total votes		392	100.0

After no one won the Republican nomination, two replacement candidates filed to run:

- Dean Rolland, small business owner and candidate for this district in 2020
- Rohan St. Marthe, video producer

==== General election ====
Chittenden Southeast general election, 2022
Party	Candidate	Votes	%
Democratic/Progressive	Kesha Ram Hinsdale (incumbent)	30,923	32.1
Democratic	Thomas Chittenden (incumbent)	25,689	26.6
Democratic	Ginny Lyons (incumbent)	24,202	25.1
Republican	Dean Rolland	8,537	8.9
Republican	Rohan St. Marthe	6,853	7.1
Write-in	Write-ins	203	0.2
Total votes		96,407	100.0
Democratic hold			
Democratic hold			
Democratic hold			
Democratic loss (seat eliminated)			

People who received three or more write-in votes include Lewis Mudge (10), Philip Baruth (3), Randy Brock (3), Gerald Malloy (3), and Christina Nolan (3).

=== Essex ===
Essex district
- November 8, 2022
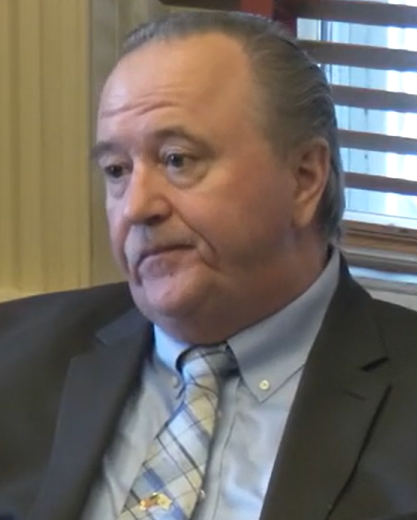
Nominee	Russ Ingalls
Party	Republican
Alliance	Democratic
Popular vote	6,485
Percentage	95.3%
Senator before election
Russ Ingalls
Republican
Elected Senator
Russ Ingalls
Rep/Dem

- Elects one senator.

Following statewide redistricting, the former Essex-Orleans district, which elected two senators, has been split up into the Essex and Orleans districts, which each elect one senator. Incumbent Republican Russ Ingalls, who had represented the Essex-Orleans district since 2021, ran for re-election.

==== Republican primary ====
- Russ Ingalls, incumbent senator

Essex Senate district Republican primary, 2022
Party	Candidate	Votes	%
Republican	Russ Ingalls (incumbent)	1,249	98.9
Write-in	Write-ins	14	1.1
Total votes		1,263	100.0

==== Democratic primary ====
Essex Senate district Democratic primary, 2022
Party	Candidate	Votes	%
Democratic	Russ Ingalls (incumbent) (write-in)	53	36.1
Write-in	Other write-ins	94	63.9
Total votes		147	100.0

==== General election ====
Essex Senate district general election, 2022
Party	Candidate	Votes	%
Republican/Democratic	Russ Ingalls (incumbent) (Note: Candidate received the nominations of both the Republican and Democratic parties and was listed on the ballot as "Republican/Democratic" (candidate is primarily a Republican))	6,485	95.3
Write-in	Write-ins	319	4.7
Total votes		6,804	100.0
Republican hold			

People who received three or more write-in votes include Robert Starr (12), John Rodgers (9), J.T. Dodge (6), Joe Benning (5), Jane Kitchel (4), Brenda Siegel (4), Patrick Leahy (3), Brian Smith (3), and Peter Welch (3).

=== Franklin ===
Franklin district
- November 8, 2022
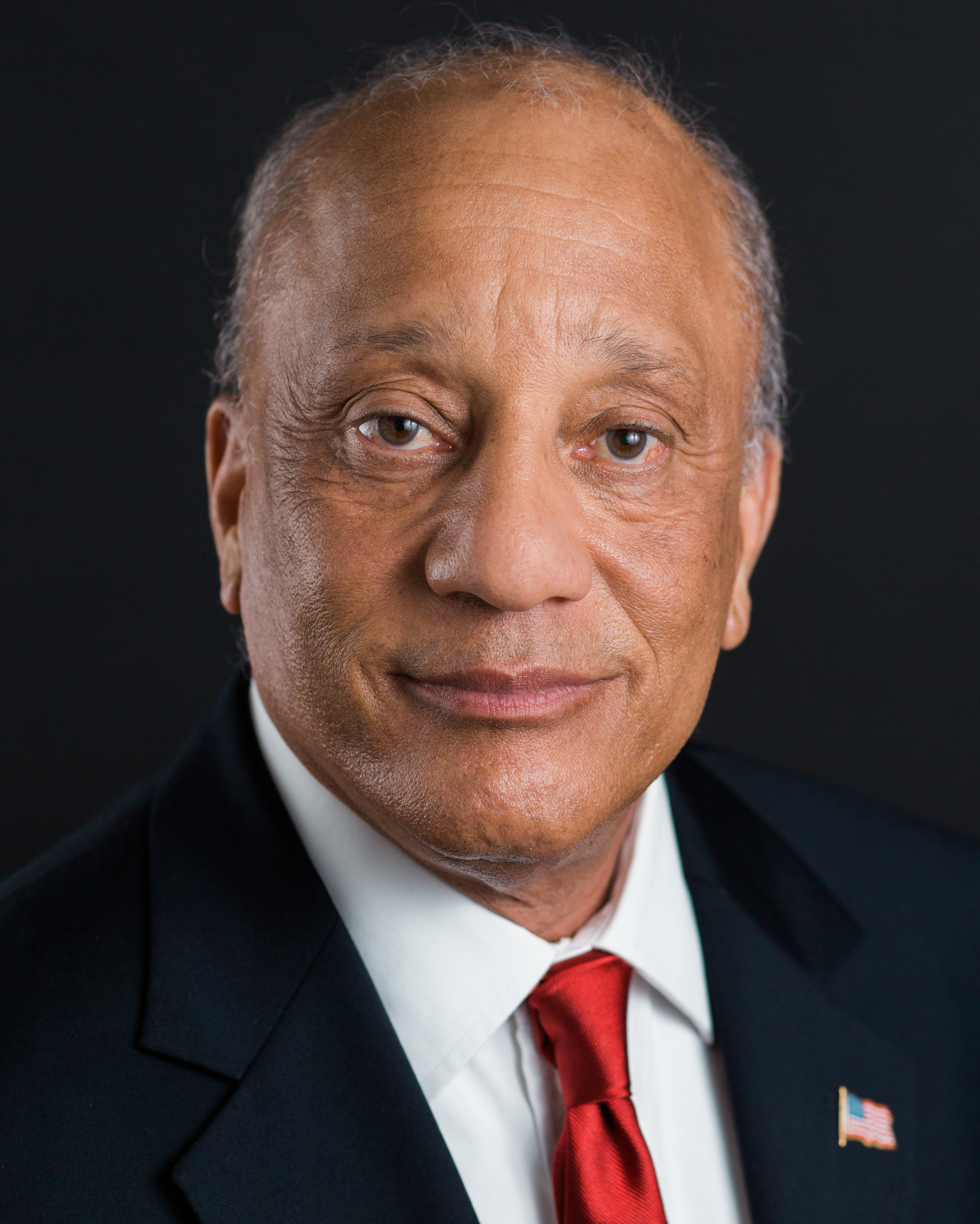

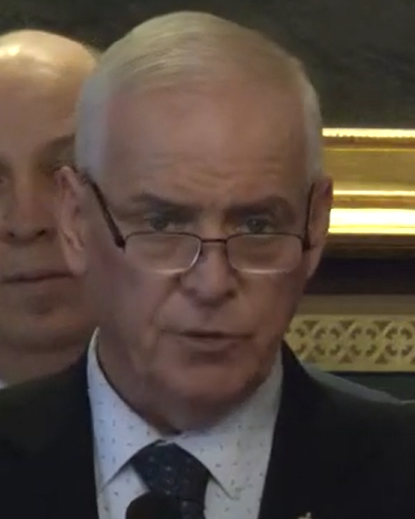

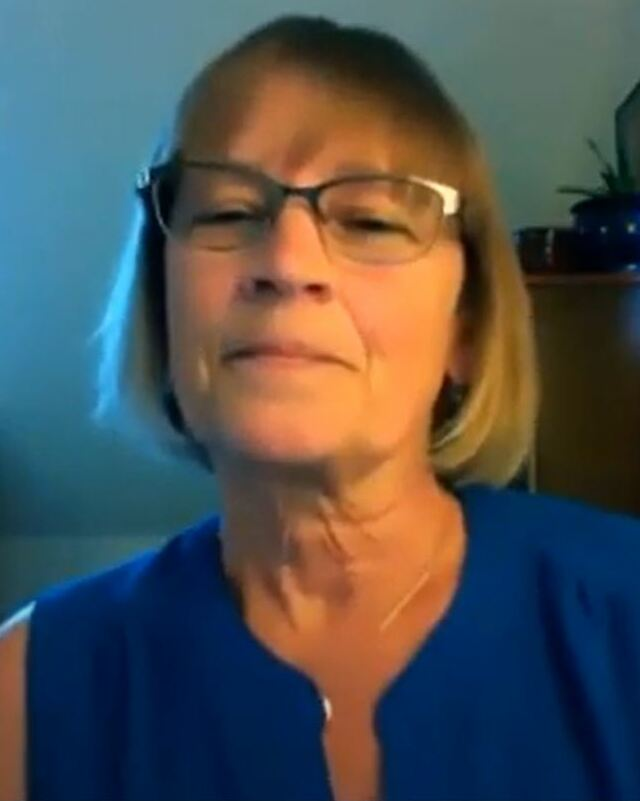
Nominee	Randy Brock	Robert Norris
Party	Republican	Republican
Popular vote	9,522	8,528
Percentage	33.1%	29.6%
Nominee	Pam McCarthy	Jessie Palczewski
Party	Democratic	Democratic
Popular vote	6,716	3,963
Percentage	23.3%	13.8%
Senators before election
Randy Brock (Republican)
Corey Parent (Republican)
Elected Senators
Randy Brock (Republican)
Robert Norris (Republican)

- Elects two senators.

Incumbent Republican Randy Brock, who had represented this district since 2017, ran for re-election. Incumbent Republican Corey Parent, who had represented this district since 2019, retired.

==== Republican primary ====
- Randy Brock, incumbent senator
- Robert Norris, state representative and former Franklin County Sheriff

Franklin Senate district Republican primary, 2022
Party	Candidate	Votes	%
Republican	Randy Brock (incumbent)	1,878	50.6
Republican	Robert Norris	1,789	48.2
Write-in	Write-ins	42	1.1
Total votes		3,709	100.0

==== Democratic primary ====
- Pam McCarthy, former nonprofit executive, mother of state representative Mike McCarthy, and candidate for this district in 2018
- Jessie Palczewski, small business owner

Franklin Senate district Democratic primary, 2022
Party	Candidate	Votes	%
Democratic	Pam McCarthy	2,761	57.6
Democratic	Jessie Palczewski	1,596	33.3
Write-in	Write-ins	435	9.1
Total votes		4,792	100.0

==== General election ====
Franklin Senate district general election, 2022
Party	Candidate	Votes	%
Republican	Randy Brock (incumbent)	9,522	33.1
Republican	Robert Norris	8,528	29.6
Democratic	Pam McCarthy	6,716	23.3
Democratic	Jessie Palczewski	3,963	13.8
Write-in	Write-ins	64	0.2
Total votes		28,793	100.0
Republican hold			
Republican hold			

Leland Morgan received three write-in votes.

=== Grand Isle ===
Grand Isle district
- November 8, 2022
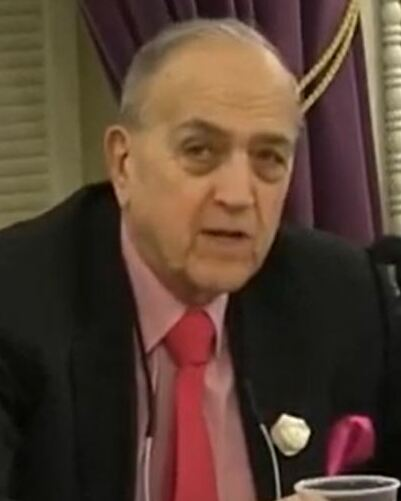

Nominee	Richard Mazza	Stephen Bellows
Party	Democratic	Republican
Popular vote	7,209	2,629
Percentage	73.0%	26.6%
Senator before election
Richard Mazza
Democratic
Elected Senator
Richard Mazza
Democratic

- Elects one senator.

Incumbent Democrat Richard Mazza, who had represented this district since 1985, ran for re-election.

==== Democratic primary ====
- Richard Mazza, incumbent senator

Grand Isle Senate district Democratic primary, 2022
Party	Candidate	Votes	%
Democratic	Richard Mazza (incumbent)	2,977	98.5
Write-in	Write-ins	44	1.5
Total votes		3,021	100.0

==== Republican primary ====
- Stephen Bellows, landscaping contractor (also ran for governor)

Grand Isle Senate district Republican primary, 2022
Party	Candidate	Votes	%
Republican	Stephen Bellows	888	96.0
Write-in	Write-ins	37	4.0
Total votes		925	100.0

==== General election ====
Grand Isle Senate district general election, 2022
Party	Candidate	Votes	%
Democratic	Richard Mazza (incumbent)	7,209	73.0
Republican	Stephen Bellows	2,629	26.6
Write-in	Write-ins	38	0.4
Total votes		9,876	100.0
Democratic hold			

=== Lamoille ===
Lamoille district
- November 8, 2022
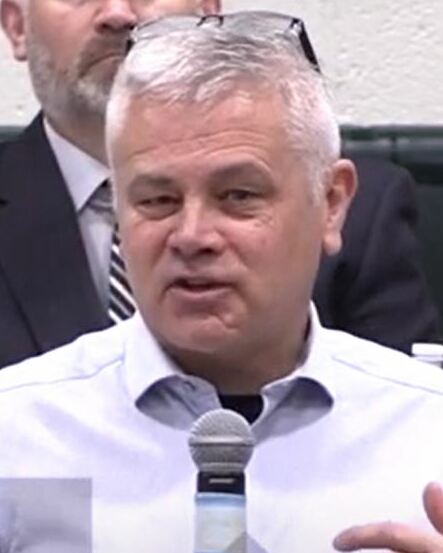
Nominee	Richard Westman
Party	Republican
Alliance	Democratic
Popular vote	8,003
Percentage	97.5%
Senator before election
Richard Westman
Republican
Elected Senator
Richard Westman
Rep/Dem

- Elects one senator.

Incumbent Republican Richard Westman, who had represented this district since 2011, ran for re-election.

==== Republican primary ====
- Richard Westman, incumbent senator

Lamoille Senate district Republican primary, 2022
Party	Candidate	Votes	%
Republican	Richard Westman (incumbent)	828	98.0
Write-in	Write-ins	17	2.0
Total votes		845	100.0

==== Democratic primary ====
Lamoille Senate district Democratic primary, 2022
Party	Candidate	Votes	%
Democratic	Richard Westman (incumbent) (write-in)	209	70.8
Write-in	Other write-ins	86	29.2
Total votes		295	100.0

==== General election ====
Lamoille Senate district general election, 2022
Party	Candidate	Votes	%
Republican/Democratic	Richard Westman (incumbent)	8,003	97.5
Write-in	Write-ins	203	2.5
Total votes		8,206	100.0
Republican hold			

People who received three or more write-in votes include Lucy Rogers (9), David Yacovone (4), Gerald Malloy (3), Bernie Sanders (3), and Shap Smith (3).

=== Orange ===
Orange district
- November 8, 2022
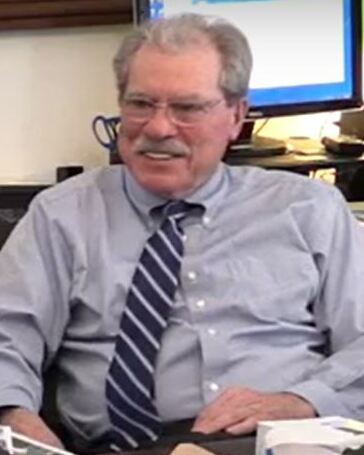

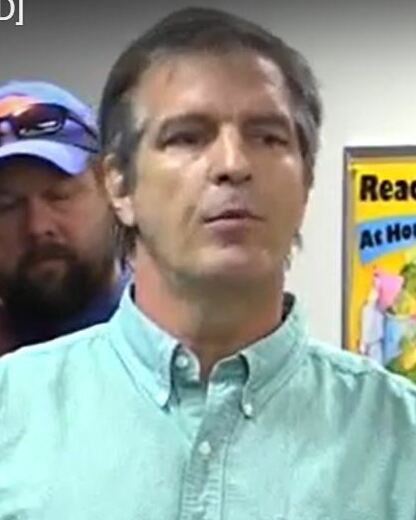
Nominee	Mark MacDonald	John Klar
Party	Democratic	Republican
Popular vote	5,683	4,516
Percentage	55.4%	44.1%
Senator before election
Mark MacDonald
Democratic
Elected Senator
Mark MacDonald
Democratic

- Elects one senator.

Incumbent Democrat Mark MacDonald, who had represented this district since 2003, ran for re-election.

==== Democratic primary ====
- Mark MacDonald, incumbent senator

Orange Senate district Democratic primary
Party	Candidate	Votes	%
Democratic	Mark MacDonald (incumbent)	2,588	97.1
Write-in	Write-ins	78	2.9
Total votes		2,666	100.0

==== Republican primary ====
- John Klar, attorney, farmer, and candidate for governor of Vermont in 2020

Orange Senate district Republican primary, 2022
Party	Candidate	Votes	%
Republican	John Klar	970	97.7
Write-in	Write-ins	23	2.3
Total votes		993	100.0

==== General election ====
Orange general election, 2022
Party	Candidate	Votes	%
Democratic	Mark MacDonald (incumbent)	5,683	55.4
Republican	John Klar	4,516	44.1
Write-in	Write-ins	50	0.5
Total votes		10,249	100.0
Democratic hold			

=== Orleans ===
Orleans district
- November 8, 2022
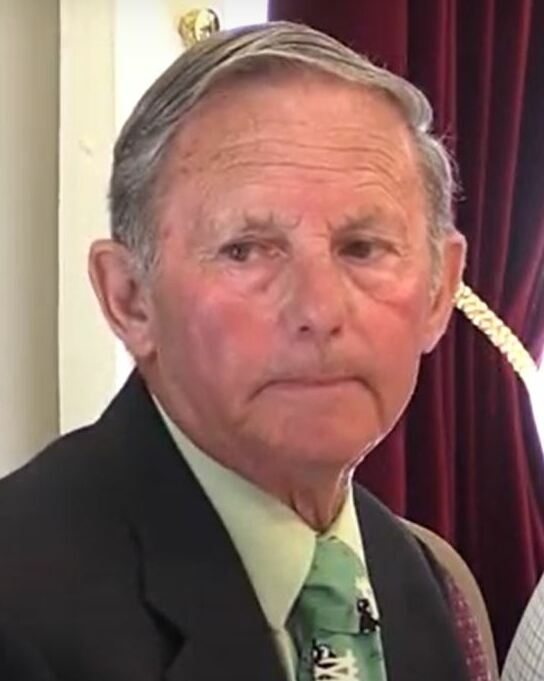

Nominee	Robert Starr	Samuel Douglass
Party	Democratic	Republican
Popular vote	5,286	3,791
Percentage	58.1%	41.7%
Senator before election
Robert Starr
Democratic
Elected Senator
Robert Starr
Democratic

- Elects one senator.

Following statewide redistricting, the former Essex-Orleans district, which elected two senators, has been split up into the Essex and Orleans districts, which each elect one senator. Incumbent Democrat Robert Starr, who had represented the Essex-Orleans district since 2005, ran for re-election here.

==== Democratic primary ====
- Robert Starr, incumbent senator

Orleans Senate district Democratic primary, 2022
Party	Candidate	Votes	%
Democratic	Robert Starr (incumbent)	1,793	98.5
Write-in	Write-ins	27	1.5
Total votes		1,820	100.0

==== Republican primary ====
- Samuel Douglass, chair of Vermont Young Republicans

Orleans Senate district Republican primary, 2022
Party	Candidate	Votes	%
Republican	Samuel Douglass	1,066	95.1
Write-in	Write-ins	55	4.9
Total votes		1,121	100.0

==== General election ====
Orleans Senate district general election, 2022
Party	Candidate	Votes	%
Democratic	Robert Starr (incumbent)	5,286	58.1
Republican	Samuel Douglass	3,791	41.7
Write-in	Write-ins	19	0.2
Total votes		9,096	100.0
Democratic hold			

=== Rutland ===
Rutland district
- November 8, 2022
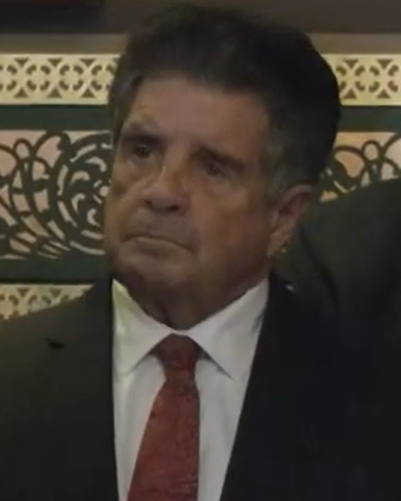

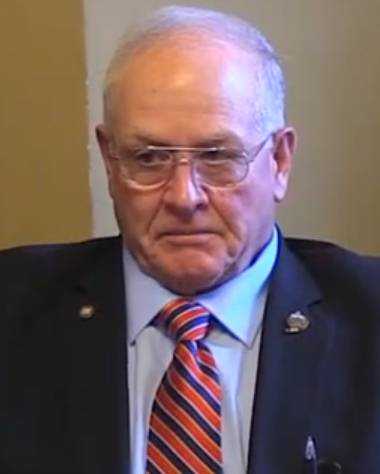

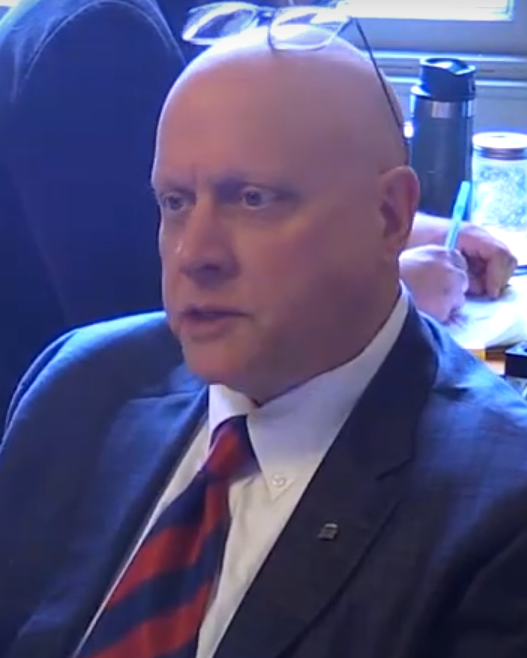
Nominee	Brian Collamore	Terry Williams	Dave Weeks
Party	Republican	Republican	Republican
Popular vote	13,878	11,453	10,703
Percentage	21.0%	17.3%	16.3%
Nominee	Anna Tadio	Bridgette Remington	Joshua Ferguson
Party	Democratic	Democratic	Democratic
Popular vote	10,453	10,134	9,359
Percentage	15.8%	15.3%	14.2%
Senators before election
Brian Collamore (Republican)
Joshua Terenzini (Republican)
Cheryl Hooker (Dem/Prog)
Elected Senators
Brian Collamore (Republican)
Terry Williams (Republican)
Dave Weeks (Republican)

- Elects three senators.

Incumbent Republican Brian Collamore, who had represented the district since 2015, ran for re-election. Incumbent Democrat Cheryl Hooker, who had represented the district since 2019, and incumbent Republican Joshua Terenzini, who had represented the district since 2021, were both retiring.

==== Republican primary ====
- Brian Collamore, incumbent senator
- Dave Weeks, national security expert and military veteran
- Terry Williams, Poultney selectman and candidate for this district in 2020

Rutland Senate district Republican primary, 2022
Party	Candidate	Votes	%
Republican	Brian Collamore (incumbent)	2,966	37.8
Republican	Terry Williams	2,554	32.6
Republican	Dave Weeks	2,273	29.0
Write-in	Write-ins	50	0.6
Total votes		7,843	100.0

==== Democratic primary ====
- Joshua Ferguson, sailboat repairman (write-in)
- Bridgette Remington, attorney
- Anna Tadio, Rutland city councilor and vice chair of the Rutland County Democratic Party

Rutland Senate district Democratic primary, 2022
Party	Candidate	Votes	%
Democratic	Anna Tadio	3,867	48.7
Democratic	Bridgette Remington	3,653	46.0
Democratic	Joshua Ferguson (write-in)	148	1.9
Write-in	Other Write-ins	280	3.5
Total votes		7,948	100.0

==== General election ====
Rutland Senate district general election, 2022
Party	Candidate	Votes	%
Republican	Brian Collamore (incumbent)	13,878	21.0
Republican	Terry Williams	11,453	17.3
Republican	Dave Weeks	10,703	16.2
Democratic	Anna Tadio	10,453	15.8
Democratic	Bridgette Remington	10,134	15.3
Democratic	Joshua Ferguson	9,359	14.2
Write-in	Write-ins	63	0.1
Total votes		66,043	100.0
Republican hold			
Republican hold			
Republican gain from Democratic			

=== Washington ===
Washington district
- November 8, 2022
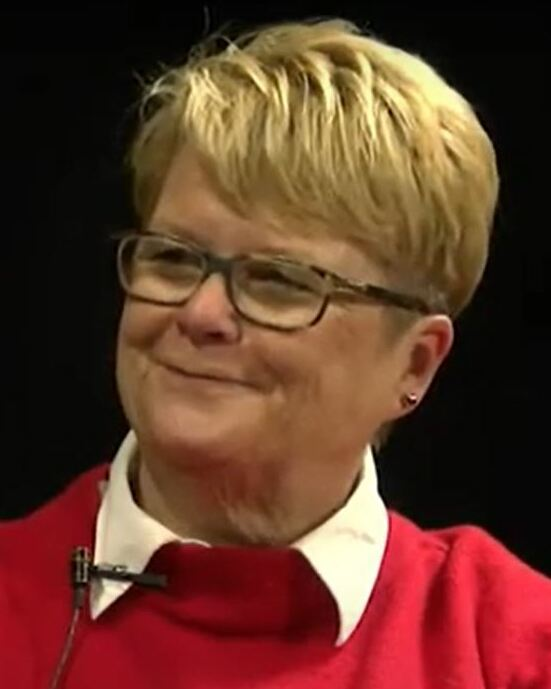

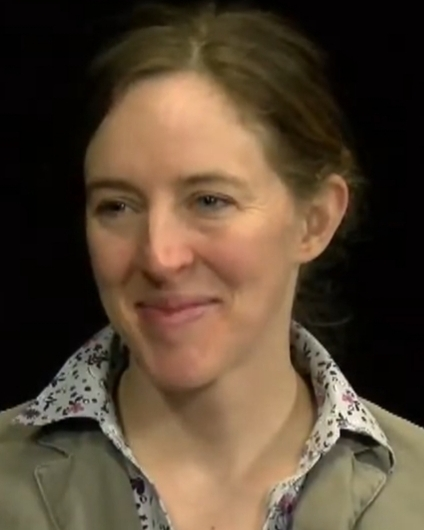

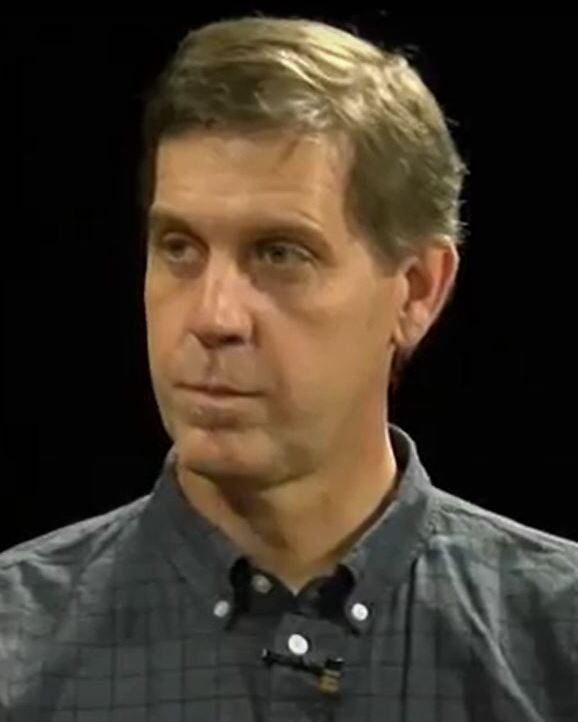

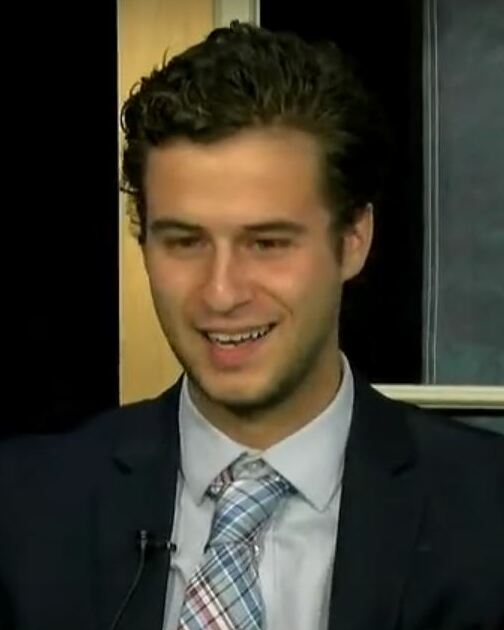

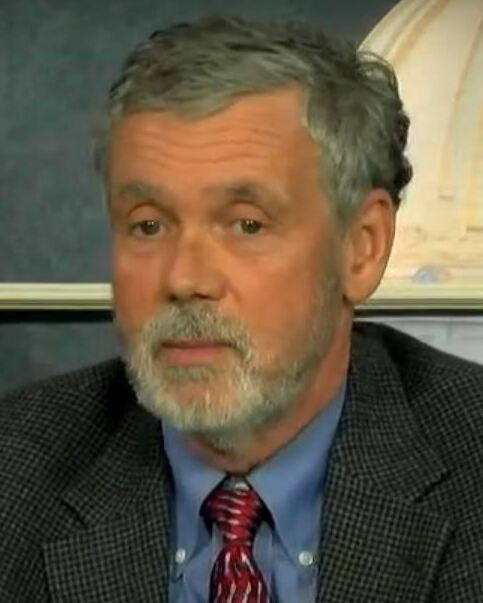
Nominee	Ann Cummings	Anne Watson	Andrew Perchlik
Party	Democratic	Democratic	Democratic
Alliance		Progressive	Progressive
Popular vote	20,507	17,860	16,521
Percentage	26.2%	22.9%	21.1%
Nominee	Paul Bean	Dwayne Tucker	Dexter Lefavour
Party	Republican	Republican	Republican
Alliance			Libertarian
Popular vote	9,738	8,376	4,931
Percentage	12.5%	10.7%	6.3%
Senators before election
Ann Cummings (Democratic)
Anthony Pollina (Progressive)
Andrew Perchlik (Dem/Prog)
Elected Senators
Ann Cummings (Democratic)
Anne Watson (Dem/Prog)
Andrew Perchlik (Dem/Prog)

- Elects three senators.

Incumbent Democrats Ann Cummings, who had represented the district since 1997, and Andrew Perchlik, who had represented the district since 2019, both sought re-election. Incumbent Progressive Leader Anthony Pollina, who had represented the district since 2011, retired.

==== Democratic primary ====
- Ann Cummings, incumbent senator
- Jared Duval, semiconductor manufacturing executive
- Jeremy Hansen, Berlin selectman and Independent candidate for this district in 2012
- Andrew Perchlik, incumbent senator
- Anne Watson, mayor of Montpelier

Washington Senate district Democratic primary, 2022
Party	Candidate	Votes	%
Democratic	Anne Watson	7,694	25.3
Democratic	Ann Cummings (incumbent)	7,609	25.0
Democratic	Andrew Perchlik (incumbent)	6,587	21.6
Democratic	Jared Duval	5,606	18.4
Democratic	Jeremy Hansen	2,952	9.6
Write-in	Write-ins	160	5.2
Total votes		30,608	100.0

==== Republican primary ====
- Paul Bean
- Dexter Lefavour, farmer, engineer, and candidate for this district in 2012 (write-in)
- Dwayne Tucker, civil engineer and candidate for lieutenant governor of Vermont in 2020

Washington Senate district Republican primary, 2022
Party	Candidate	Votes	%
Republican	Dwayne Tucker	1,943	47.96
Republican	Paul Bean	1,755	43.32
Republican	Dexter Lefavour (write-in)	120	2.96
Write-in	Other write-ins	233	5.75
Total votes		4,051	100.0

==== General election ====
Washington general election, 2022
Party	Candidate	Votes	%
Democratic	Ann Cummings (incumbent)	20,507	26.2
Democratic/Progressive	Anne Watson	17,860	22.9
Democratic/Progressive	Andrew Perchlik (incumbent)	16,521	21.1
Republican	Paul Bean	9,738	12.5
Republican	Dwayne Tucker	8,376	10.7
Republican/Libertarian	Dexter Lefavour (Note: Candidate received the nominations of both the Republican and Libertarian parties and was listed on the ballot as "Republican/Libertarian" (candidate is primarily a Republican))	4,931	6.3
Write-in	Write-ins	227	0.3
Total votes		78,160	100.0
Democratic hold			
Democratic gain from Progressive			
Democratic hold			

People who received three or more write-in votes include John Klar (36), Jared Duval (33), Jeremy Hansen (5), Richard Westman (4), Mark MacDonald (3), and Bernie Sanders (3).

=== Windham ===
Windham district
- November 8, 2022
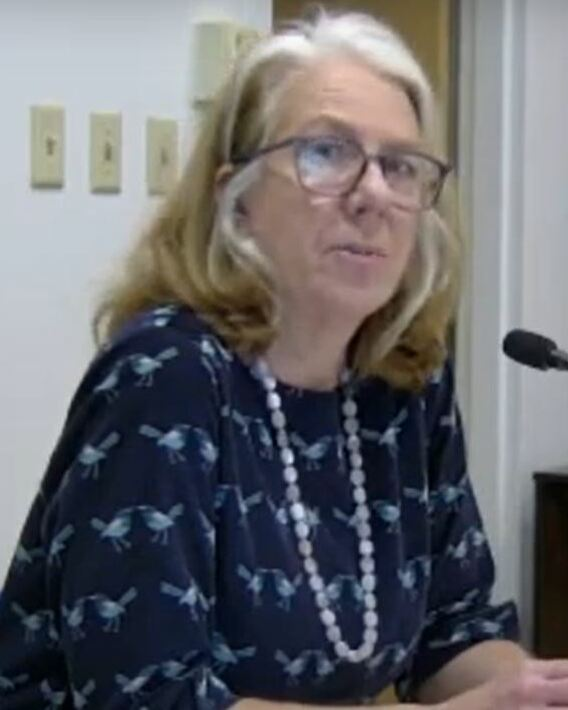

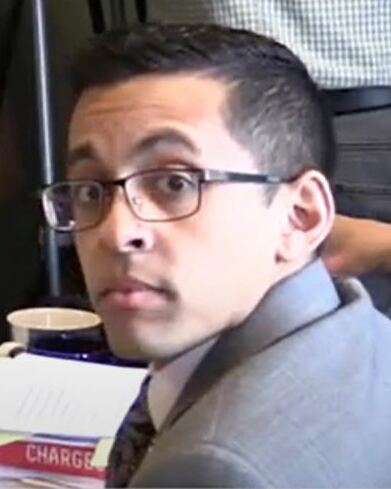

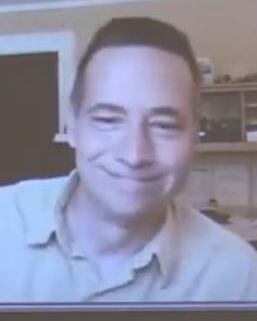

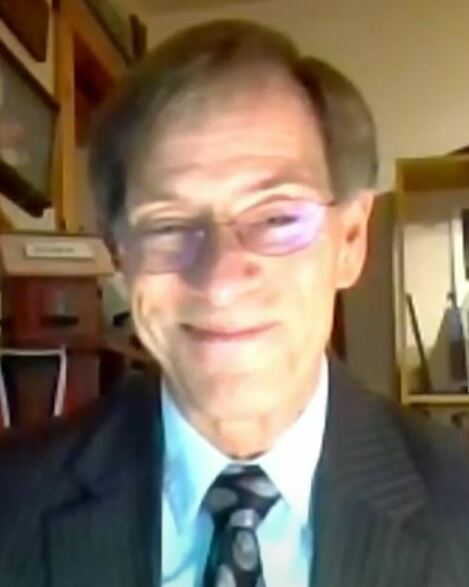

Nominee	Wendy Harrison	Nader Hashim	Tim Wessel
Party	Democratic	Democratic	Independent
Popular vote	10,968	9,997	3,677
Percentage	34.2%	31.2%	11.5%
Nominee	Richard Morton	Richard Kenyon
Party	Republican	Republican
Popular vote	3,249	3,082
Percentage	10.1%	9.6%
Senators before election
Becca Balint (Democratic)
Jeanette White (Democratic)
Elected Senators
Wendy Harrison (Democratic)
Nader Hashim (Democratic)

- Elects two senators.

Incumbent Democrat Senate President pro tempore Becca Balint, who had represented the district since 2015, retired to run for Congress. Incumbent Democrat Jeanette White, who had represented the district since 2003, also retired.

==== Democratic primary ====
- Wichie Artu, farmer
- Wendy Harrison, traveling municipal manager
- Nader Hashim, former state representative

Windham Senate district Democratic primary, 2022
Party	Candidate	Votes	%
Democratic	Nader Hashim	5,522	40.7
Democratic	Wendy Harrison	4,925	36.3
Democratic	Wichie Artu	3,089	22.8
Write-in	Write-ins	27	0.2
Total votes		13,563	100.0

==== Republican primary ====
- Mark Coester, logger (also ran for U.S. Senate as an independent)
- Richard Kenyon, tax preparer and nominee for Vermont State Auditor in 2018
- Richard Morton, chair of the Windham County Republican Party and nominee for Vermont State Treasurer in 2018 (also ran for state auditor)

Windham Senate district Republican primary, 2022
Party	Candidate	Votes	%
Republican	Mark Coester	542	32.9
Republican	Richard Kenyon	539	32.8
Republican	Richard Morton	528	32.1
Write-in	Write-ins	36	2.2
Total votes		1,645	100.0

After winning the primary, Mark Coester filed to run as an independent instead. The Windham County Republican Committee chose Richard Morton, the third-place primary finisher, to replace him as the second Republican on the general election ballot.

==== Independents ====
- Mark Coester, logger
- Tim Wessel, Brattleboro selectman

==== General election ====
Windham general election, 2022
Party	Candidate	Votes	%
Democratic	Wendy Harrison	10,968	34.2
Democratic	Nader Hashim	9,997	31.2
Independent	Tim Wessel	3,677	11.5
Republican	Richard Morton	3,249	10.1
Republican	Richard Kenyon	3,082	9.6
Independent	Mark Coester	1,036	3.2
Write-in	Write-ins	42	0.1
Total votes		32,051	100.0
Democratic hold			
Democratic hold			

Wichie Artu, the loser of the Democratic primary, received 20 write-in votes.

=== Windsor ===
Windsor district
- November 8, 2022
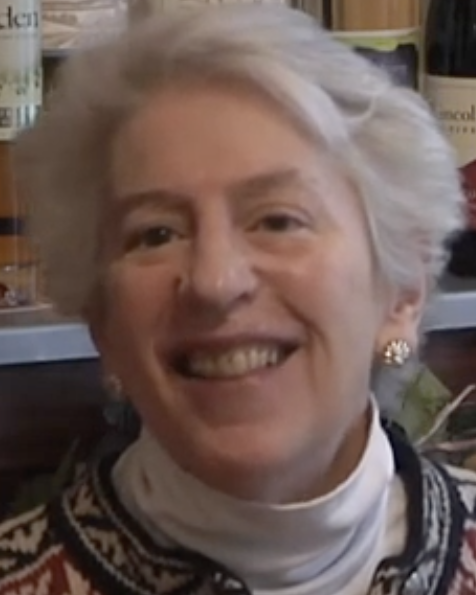

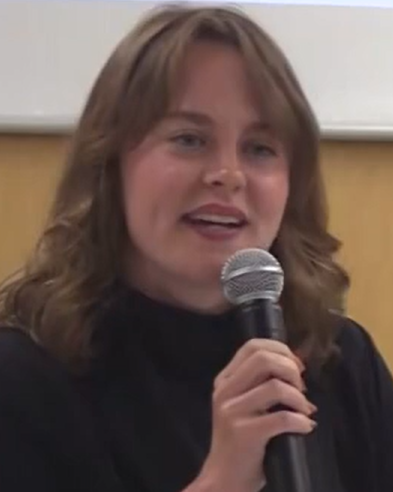

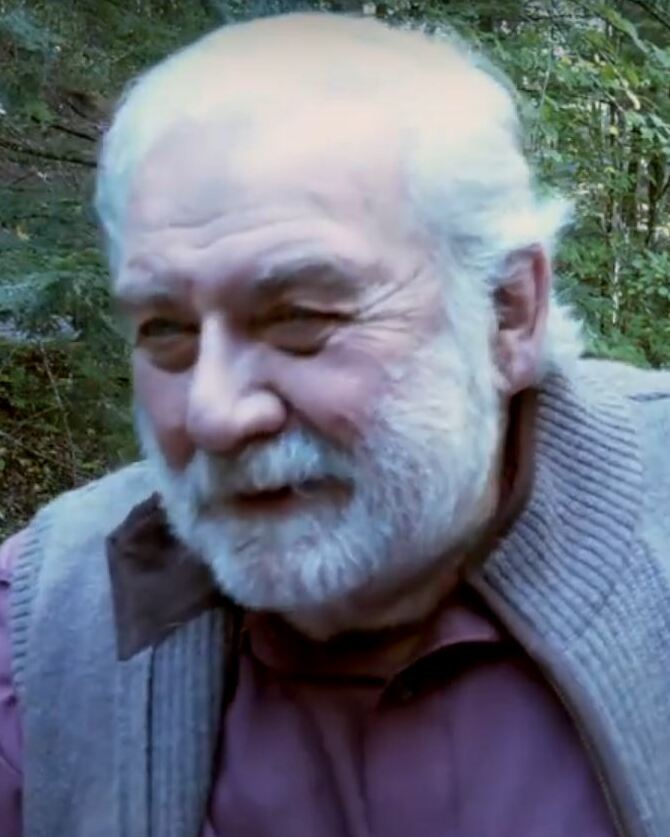

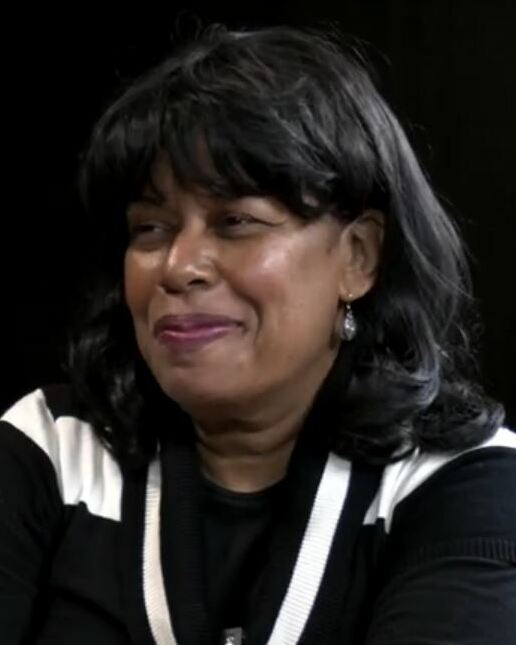

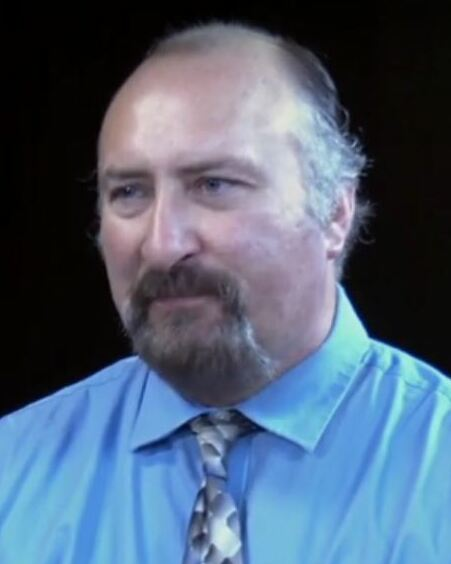
Nominee	Alison Clarkson	Rebecca White	Richard McCormack
Party	Democratic	Democratic	Democratic
Popular vote	17,042	16,740	16,539
Percentage	23.4%	22.9%	22.7%
Nominee	Alice Flanders	Dana Colson	Bill Huff
Party	Republican	Republican	Republican
Popular vote	7,737	7,586	7,184
Percentage	10.6%	10.4%	9.8%
Senators before election
Alison Clarkson (Democratic)
Alice Nitka (Democratic)
Richard McCormack (Democratic)
Elected Senators
Alison Clarkson (Democratic)
Rebecca White (Democratic)
Richard McCormack (Democratic)

- Elects three senators.

Incumbent Democrats Alison Clarkson, who had represented the district since 2017, and Richard McCormack, who had represented the district since 2007, both sought re-election. Incumbent Democrat Alice Nitka, who had represented the district since 2007, retired.

==== Democratic primary ====
- Alison Clarkson, incumbent senator
- Richard McCormack, incumbent senator
- Chris Morrow, former bookstore owner (withdrew, remained on ballot)
- Rebecca White, state representative

Windsor Senate district Democratic primary, 2022
Party	Candidate	Votes	%
Democratic	Rebecca White	10,111	31.4
Democratic	Alison Clarkson (incumbent)	10,070	31.2
Democratic	Richard McCormack (incumbent)	8,971	27.8
Democratic	Chris Morrow (withdrawn)	3,080	9.6
Total votes		29,152	100.0

==== Republican primary ====
- Dana Colson, welding supplies company owner and candidate for lieutenant governor of Vermont in 2020
- Alice Flanders, former teacher and retired U.S. Navy engineer
- Bill Huff, retired pilot and nominee for the Orange district in 2020 (write-in, also ran for state house)

Windsor Senate district Republican primary, 2022
Party	Candidate	Votes	%
Republican	Dana Colson	1,570	47.4
Republican	Alice Flanders	1,481	44.7
Republican	Bill Huff (write-in)	85	2.6
Republican	Other write-ins	179	5.4
Total votes		3,315	100.0

==== General election ====
Windsor Senate district general election, 2022
Party	Candidate	Votes	%
Democratic	Alison Clarkson (incumbent)	17,042	23.4
Democratic	Rebecca White	16,740	22.9
Democratic	Richard McCormack (incumbent)	16,539	22.7
Republican	Alice Flanders	7,737	10.6
Republican	Dana Colson	7,586	10.4
Republican	Bill Huff	7,184	9.8
Write-in	Write-ins	119	0.2
Total votes		72,947	100.0
Democratic hold			
Democratic hold			
Democratic hold			

People who received three or more write-in votes include John Klar (11), Anna Tadio (4), Cris Ericson (3), Gerald Malloy (3), Chris Morrow (3), and David Zuckerman (3).

== See also ==
- 2022 Vermont elections
- 2022 United States elections
- 2022 United States Senate election in Vermont
- 2022 United States House of Representatives election in Vermont
- 2022 Vermont gubernatorial election
- 2022 Vermont lieutenant gubernatorial election
- 2022 Vermont House of Representatives election
