= 2018 Vermont Senate election =

- November 6, 2018

All 30 seats in the Vermont Senate 15 (plus the Lt. Gov.) seats needed for a majority
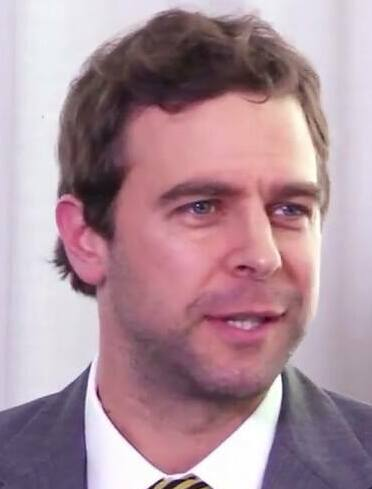

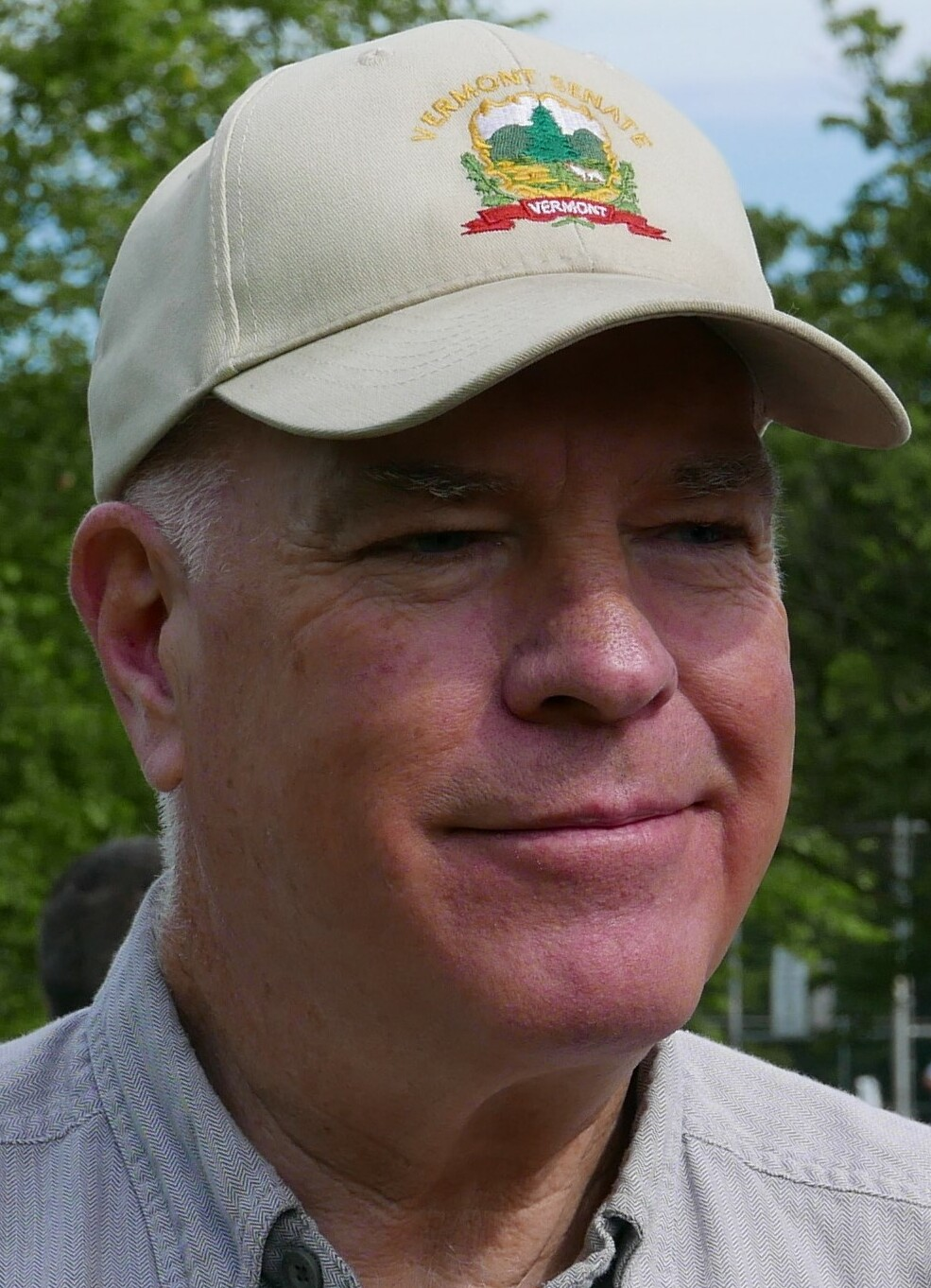

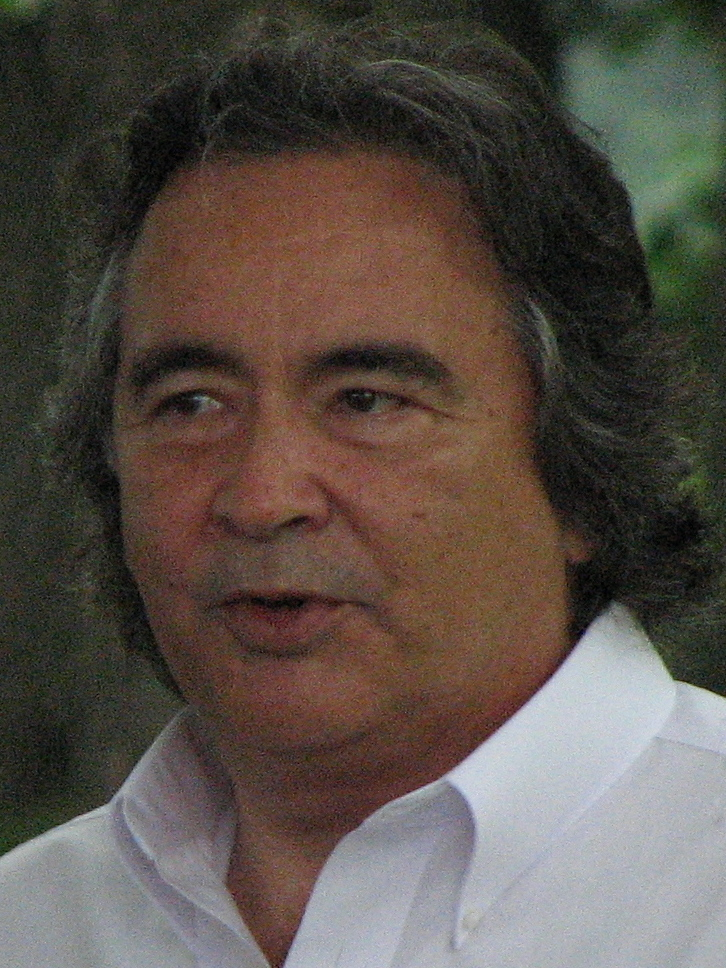
	Majority party	Minority party	Third party
Leader	Tim Ashe	Joe Benning	Anthony Pollina
Party	Democratic	Republican	Progressive
Leader since	January 6, 2017	January 4, 2018	2013
Leader's seat	Chittenden	Caledonia	Washington
Last election	21	7	2
Seats won	22 (Note: Not counting Progressive and Republican candidates who were also nominated by the Democratic Party)	6 (Note: Not counting Democratic candidates who were also nominated by the Republican Party)	2 (Note: Not counting Democratic candidates who were also nominated by the Progressive Party)
Seat change	▲1	▼1	Steady
Popular vote	417,375	178,737	45,410
Percentage	60.8%	26.0%	6.6%
Swing	▼1.1%	▼0.6%	▲0.04%
- Results: Democratic gain Democratic hold Republican hold Progressive hold
President of the Senate before election
Tim Ashe
Democrat/Progressive
Elected President of the Senate
Tim Ashe
Democrat/Progressive

The 2018 Vermont Senate election took place as part of the biennial United States elections. Vermont voters elected State Senators in all 30 seats. State senators serve two-year terms in the Vermont Senate. A primary election on August 14, 2018, determined which candidates appeared on the November 6 general election ballot.

Following the 2016 State Senate elections, Democrats maintained effective control of the Senate with 23 members in the majority caucus (21 Democrats and two Progressives). To claim control of the chamber from Democrats, the Republicans would have needed to net gain eight or nine seats depending on the winner of the 2018 Vermont lieutenant governor election, which was Progressive Dave Zuckerman. However, in the elections, the Democrats instead gained one seat from the Republicans.

== Results ==
Primary election results can be obtained from the Vermont Secretary of State's website.

State Senate district	Incumbent	Party	Elected Senator	Party
Addison	Claire Ayer	Dem	Ruth Hardy	Dem
Addison	Christopher Bray	Dem	Christopher Bray	Dem
Bennington	Brian Campion	Dem	Brian Campion	Dem
Bennington	Dick Sears	Dem	Dick Sears	Dem
Caledonia	Joe Benning	Rep	Joe Benning	Rep/Dem
Caledonia	Jane Kitchel	Dem/Rep	Jane Kitchel	Dem/Rep
Chittenden	Tim Ashe	Dem/Prog	Tim Ashe	Dem/Prog
Chittenden	Phil Baruth	Dem/Prog	Phil Baruth	Dem/Prog
Chittenden	Debbie Ingram	Dem	Debbie Ingram	Dem/Prog
Chittenden	Ginny Lyons	Dem	Ginny Lyons	Dem/Prog
Chittenden	Christopher Pearson	Prog/Dem	Christopher Pearson	Prog/Dem
Chittenden	Michael Sirotkin	Dem	Michael Sirotkin	Dem/Prog
Essex-Orleans	John Rodgers	Dem	John Rodgers	Dem/Rep
Essex-Orleans	Robert Starr	Dem/Rep	Robert Starr	Dem/Rep
Franklin	Carolyn Whitney Branagan	Rep	Corey Parent	Rep
Franklin	Randy Brock	Rep	Randy Brock	Rep
Grand Isle	Richard Mazza	Dem	Richard Mazza	Dem
Lamoille	Richard Westman	Rep	Richard Westman	Rep
Orange	Mark MacDonald	Dem	Mark MacDonald	Dem
Rutland	Brian Collamore	Rep	Brian Collamore	Rep
Rutland	Peg Flory	Rep	James McNeil	Rep
Rutland	David Soucy	Rep	Cheryl Hooker	Dem/Prog
Washington	Francis Brooks	Dem	Andrew Perchlik	Dem/Prog
Washington	Ann Cummings	Dem	Ann Cummings	Dem
Washington	Anthony Pollina	Prog/Dem	Anthony Pollina	Prog/Dem
Windham	Becca Balint	Dem	Becca Balint	Dem
Windham	Jeanette White	Dem	Jeanette White	Dem
Windsor	Alison Clarkson	Dem	Alison Clarkson	Dem
Windsor	Richard McCormack	Dem	Richard McCormack	Dem/Prog
Windsor	Alice Nitka	Dem	Alice Nitka	Dem

== Predictions ==
Source	Ranking	As of
Governing	Safe D	October 8, 2018

== Detailed results ==
- Note: Primary election results are only shown for contested primary elections. For information on non-contested primaries, visit the Vermont Secretary of State's website.

=== Addison ===
- Elects two senators.

Incumbent Democrat Claire Ayer, who had represented the Addison district since 2003, did not seek re-election. Incumbent Democrat Christopher Bray, who had represented the Addison district since 2013, was re-elected. Fellow Democrat Ruth Hardy won the open seat.

Vermont Senate Addison district general election, 2018
Party	Candidate	Votes	%
Democratic	Ruth Hardy	9,040	24.21%
Democratic	Christopher Bray (incumbent)	8,898	23.83%
Republican	Peter Briggs	5,290	14.16%
Independent	Marie Audet	5,169	13.84%
Independent	Paul Ralston	3,100	8.3%
Libertarian	Archie Flower	602	1.61%
N/A	Blanks	5,218	13.97%
N/A	Write-ins	28	0.07%
N/A	Overvotes	1	0.00%
Total votes		37,346	100%
Democratic hold			
Democratic hold			

=== Bennington ===
- Elects two senators.

Incumbent Democrats Dick Sears, who had represented the Bennington district since 1993, and Brian Campion, who had represented the Bennington district since 2015, were both re-elected.

Vermont Senate Bennington district general election, 2018
Party	Candidate	Votes	%
Democratic	Dick Sears (incumbent)	10,525	33.17%
Democratic	Brian Campion (incumbent)	9,734	30.67%
Libertarian	Jeff Kaufer	2,762	8.7%
N/A	Blanks	8,532	26.89%
N/A	Write-ins	175	0.55%
N/A	Overvotes	6	0.02%
Total votes		31,734	100%
Democratic hold			
Democratic hold			

=== Caledonia ===
- Elects two senators.

Incumbent Democrat Jane Kitchel, who had represented the Caledonia district since 2005, and incumbent Republican Minority Leader Joe Benning, who had represented the Caledonia district since 2011, were both re-elected.

Vermont Senate Caledonia district election, 2018
Party	Candidate	Votes	%
Democratic	Jane Kitchel (incumbent) (Note: Running as "Democratic/Republican")	10,967	35.61%
Republican	Joe Benning (incumbent) (Note: Running as "Republican/Democratic")	9,818	30.19%
N/A	Blanks	9,832	31.93%
N/A	Write-ins	167	0.54%
N/A	Overvotes	10	0.03%
Total votes		30,794	100%
Democratic hold			
Republican hold			

=== Chittenden ===
- Elects six senators.

Incumbent Democrat Philip Baruth, who had represented the Chittenden district since 2011, incumbent Progressive Christopher Pearson, who had represented the Chittenden district since 2017, incumbent Democratic president pro tempore Tim Ashe, who had represented the Chittenden district since 2009, incumbent Democrat Ginny Lyons, who had represented the Chittenden district since 2001, incumbent Democrat Debbie Ingram, who had represented the Chittenden district since 2017, and incumbent Democrat Michael Sirotkin, who had represented the Chittenden district since 2014, were all re-elected.

Vermont Senate Chittenden district Republican primary election, 2018
Party	Candidate	Votes	%
Republican	Alex R. Farrell	3,507	9.25%
Republican	Dana Maxfield	3,255	8.59%
Republican	Paul Dame (write-in)	59	0.16%
Write-in	Total write-ins	372	0.98%
N/A	Overvotes	30	0.08%
N/A	Blank votes	30,688	80.95%
Total votes		37,911	100%

Vermont Senate Chittenden district Progressive primary election, 2018
Party	Candidate	Votes	%
Progressive	Tim Ashe (incumbent) (write-in)	118	11.05%
Progressive	Christopher Pearson (incumbent) (write-in)	116	10.86%
Progressive	Phil Baruth (incumbent) (write-in)	98	9.18%
Progressive	Debbie Ingram (incumbent) (write-in)	37	3.46%
Progressive	Michael Sirotkin (incumbent) (write-in)	35	3.28%
Progressive	Ginny Lyons (incumbent) (write-in)	30	2.81%
Progressive	Steve May (write-in)	18	1.69%
Progressive	Val Carzello (write-in)	11	1.03%
Progressive	Alex Farrell (write-in)	5	0.47%
Progressive	Dana Maxfield (write-in)	5	0.47%
Progressive	Finnian Boardman Abbey (write-in)	3	0.28%
Write-in	Write-ins (other)	39	3.65
N/A	Overvotes	10	0.94%
N/A	Blank votes	541	50.66%
Total votes		1,068	100%

Vermont Senate Chittenden district Democratic primary election, 2018
Party	Candidate	Votes	%
Democratic	Tim Ashe (incumbent)	13,527	11.97%
Democratic	Ginny Lyons (incumbent)	12,886	11.40%
Democratic	Michael Sirotkin (incumbent)	10,727	9.49%
Democratic	Debbie Ingram (incumbent)	10,701	9.47%
Democratic	Phil Baruth (incumbent)	10,302	9.12%
Democratic	Christopher Pearson (incumbent)	9,029	7.99%
Democratic	Val Carzello	5,229	4.63%
Democratic	Steve May	4,018	3.56%
Democratic	Finnian Boardman Abbey	3,771	3.34%
Write-in	Total write-ins	180	0.16%
N/A	Overvotes	50	0.04%
N/A	Blank votes	32,590	28.84%
Total votes		113,010	100%

Vermont Senate Chittenden district general election, 2018
Party	Candidate	Votes	%
Democratic	Tim Ashe (incumbent) (Note: Running as "Democratic/Progressive")	44,002	10.61%
Democratic	Ginny Lyons (incumbent)	41,617	10.03%
Democratic	Debbie Ingram (incumbent)	40,751	9.82%
Democratic	Michael Sirotkin (incumbent)	38,569	9.30%
Democratic	Phil Baruth (incumbent)	38,075	9.18%
Progressive	Christopher Pearson (incumbent) (Note: Running as "Progressive/Democratic")	30,863	7.44%
Republican	Alex R. Farrell	19,602	4.73%
Republican	Paul Dame	17,521	4.22%
Republican	Dana Maxfield	16,422	3.96%
Independent	Louis Meyers	8,848	2.13%
Libertarian	Seth Cournoyer	5,389	1.30%
Libertarian	Loyal Ploof	4,599	1.11%
Independent	Joshua H. Knox (Note: Running as "Fair Representation Vermont")	4,173	1.01%
N/A	Blanks	103,759	25.02%
N/A	Write-ins	465	0.11%
N/A	Overvotes	119	0.03%
Total votes		414,774	100%
Democratic hold			
Democratic hold			
Democratic hold			
Democratic hold			
Democratic hold			
Progressive hold			

=== Essex-Orleans ===
- Elects two senators.

Incumbent Democrats Robert Starr, who had represented the Essex-Orleans district since 2005, and John Rodgers, who had represented the Essex-Orleans district since 2013, were both re-elected.

Vermont Senate Essex-Orleans district election, 2018
Party	Candidate	Votes	%
Democratic	Robert Starr (incumbent)	9,323	32.60%
Democratic	John Rodgers (incumbent)	8,799	30.77%
American Independent	Ron Horton	2,795	9.77%
N/A	Blanks	7,568	26.47%
N/A	Write-ins	107	0.37%
N/A	Overvotes	4	0.01%
Total votes		28,596	100%
Democratic hold			
Democratic hold			

=== Franklin ===
- Elects two senators.

Incumbent Republican Randy Brock, who had represented the Franklin district since 2017, was re-elected. Incumbent Republican Carolyn Whitney Branagan, who had represented the Franklin district since 2003, retired. Fellow Republican Corey Parent won the open seat.

Vermont Senate Franklin district election, 2018
Party	Candidate	Votes	%
Republican	Randy Brock (incumbent)	9,422	26.09%
Republican	Corey Parent	9,387	26.00%
Democratic	Pam McCarthy	7,016	19.43%
Democratic	Dustin Tanner	4,038	11.18%
N/A	Blanks	6,214	17.21%
N/A	Write-ins	30	0.08%
N/A	Overvotes	1	0.00%
Total votes		36,108	100%
Republican hold			
Republican hold			

=== Grand Isle ===
- Elects one senator.

Incumbent Democrat Richard Mazza, who had represented the Grand Isle district since 1985, was re-elected.

Vermont Senate Grand Isle district general election, 2018
Party	Candidate	Votes	%
Democratic	Richard Mazza (incumbent)	8,253	84.38%
N/A	Blanks	1,344	13.74%
N/A	Write-ins	184	1.88%
Total votes		9,781	100%
Democratic hold			

=== Lamoille ===
- Elects one senator.

Incumbent Republican Richard Westman, who had represented the Lamoille district since 2011, was re-elected.

Vermont Senate Lamoille district general election, 2018
Party	Candidate	Votes	%
Republican	Richard Westman (incumbent)	9,099	83.13%
N/A	Blanks	1,726	15.77%
N/A	Write-ins	121	1.11%
Total votes		10,946	100%
Republican hold			

=== Orange ===
- Elects one senator.

Incumbent Democrat Mark MacDonald, who had represented the Orange district since 2003, was re-elected.

Vermont Senate Orange district election, 2018
Party	Candidate	Votes	%
Democratic	Mark MacDonald (incumbent)	5,167	55.59%
Republican	Bill T. Huff	3,842	41.33%
N/A	Blanks	270	2.90%
N/A	Write-ins	11	0.12%
N/A	Overvotes	5	0.05%
Total votes		9,295	100%
Democratic hold			

=== Rutland ===
- Elects three senators.

Incumbent Republican Brian Collamore, who had represented the Rutland district since 2015, was re-elected. Incumbent Republican David Soucy, who had represented the Rutland district since 2017, lost re-nomination. Incumbent Republican Peg Flory, who had represented the Rutland district since 2011, retired. Republican James McNeil and Democrat Cheryl Hooker won the open seats.

Vermont Senate Rutland district Republican primary election, 2018
Party	Candidate	Votes	%
Republican	Brian Collamore (incumbent)	3,504	21.15%
Republican	James McNeil	2,811	16.97%
Republican	Edward Larson	2,049	12.37%
Republican	Terry K. Williams	2,044	12.34%
Republican	David Soucy (incumbent)	1,661	10.02%
Republican	Greg Cox (write-in)	15	0.1%
Republican	Cheryl Hooker (write-in)	10	0.06%
Write-in	Write-ins (other)	27	1.46%
N/A	Overvotes	1	0.01%
N/A	Blank votes	4,447	26.84%
Total votes		16,569	100%

Vermont Senate Rutland district Progressive primary election, 2018
Party	Candidate	Votes	%
Progressive	Greg Cox (write-in)	13	5.89%
Progressive	Cheryl Hooker (write-in)	13	6.07%
Progressive	Scott Garren (write-in)	13	4.53%
Progressive	Brian Collamore (incumbent) (write-in)	6	5.00%
Progressive	James McNeil (write-in)	4	3.33%
Progressive	Terry K. Williams (write-in)	2	1.67%
Progressive	David Soucy (incumbent) (write-in)	2	1.67%
Write-in	Write-ins (other)	14	11.67%
N/A	Blank votes	53	44.17%
Total votes		120	100%

Vermont Senate Rutland district Democratic primary election, 2018
Party	Candidate	Votes	%
Democratic	Cheryl Hooker (write-in)	735	6.07%
Democratic	Greg Cox (write-in)	714	5.89%
Democratic	Scott Garren (write-in)	549	4.53%
Democratic	Brian Collamore (incumbent) (write-in)	88	0.73%
Democratic	James McNeil (write-in)	85	0.70%
Democratic	Edward Larsen (write-in)	58	0.48%
Democratic	Terry K. Williams (write-in)	49	0.40%
Democratic	David Soucy (incumbent) (write-in)	38	0.31%
Democratic	Bill Carris (write-in)	6	0.05%
Write-in	Write-ins (other)	236	1.95%
N/A	Overvotes	698	5.76%
N/A	Blank votes	8,858	73.12%
Total votes		12,114	100%

Vermont Senate Rutland district general election, 2018
Party	Candidate	Votes	%
Republican	Brian Collamore (incumbent)	11,380	15.65%
Democratic	Cheryl Hooker	10,767	14.81%
Republican	James McNeil	10,673	14.68%
Republican	Edward Larson	10,004	13.76%
Democratic	Greg Cox	9,949	13.69%
Democratic	Scott Garren	7,371	10.14%
N/A	Blanks	12,139	16.70%
N/A	Write-ins	67	0.09%
N/A	Overvotes	343	0.47%
Total votes		72,693	100%
Republican hold			
Democratic gain from Republican			
Republican hold			

=== Washington ===
- Elects three senators.

Incumbent Democrats Ann Cummings, who had represented the Washington district since 1997, and incumbent Progressive Minority Leader Anthony Pollina, who had represented the Washington district since 2011, were both re-elected. Incumbent Democrat Francis Brooks, who had represented the Washington district since 2017, retired. Fellow Democrat Andrew Perchlik won the open seat.

Vermont Senate Washington district Republican primary election, 2018
Party	Candidate	Votes	%
Republican	Chris Bradley	1,843	16.47
Republican	Dwayne Tucker	1,680	15.01
Republican	Ken Alger	1,645	14.70
Write-in	Total write-ins	163	1.46%
N/A	Overvotes	5	0.04%
N/A	Blank votes	5,857	52.33%
Total votes		11,193	100%

Vermont Senate Washington district Progressive primary election, 2018
Party	Candidate	Votes	%
Progressive	Anthony Pollina (incumbent) (write-in)	19	13.19%
Progressive	Andrew Perchlik (write-in)	13	9.03%
Progressive	Ann Cummings (incumbent) (write-in)	7	4.86%
Progressive	Ashley Hill (write-in)	4	2.78%
Write-in	Write-ins (other)	39	27.08%
N/A	Blank votes	62	43.06%
Total votes		144	100%

Vermont Senate Washington district Democratic primary election, 2018
Party	Candidate	Votes	%
Democratic	Anthony Pollina (incumbent)	4,793	19.48%
Democratic	Ann Cummings (incumbent)	4,632	18.82%
Democratic	Andrew Perchlik	3,872	15.74%
Democratic	Ashley Hill	2,739	11.13%
Democratic	Theo Kennedy	2,149	8.73%
Democratic	Andrew Brewer	2,033	8.26%
Write-in	Total write-ins	67	0.27%
N/A	Overvotes	10	0.04%
N/A	Blank votes	4,311	17.52%
Total votes		24,606	100%

Vermont Senate Washington district general election, 2018
Party	Candidate	Votes	%
Democratic	Ann Cummings (incumbent)	16,834	20.15%
Progressive	Anthony Pollina (incumbent)	14,547	17.42%
Democratic	Andrew Perchlik	12,614	15.10%
Republican	Chris S. Bradley	7,523	9.01%
Republican	Ken Alger	7,244	8.67%
Republican	Dwayne Tucker	7,195	8.61%
Independent	Barry Wadle	2,565	3.07%
N/A	Blanks	14,909	17.85%
N/A	Write-ins	87	0.10%
N/A	Overvotes	8	0.01%
Total votes		83,526	100%
Democratic hold			
Progressive hold			
Democratic hold			

=== Windham ===
- Elects two senators.

Incumbent Democratic Majority Leader Becca Balint, who had represented the Windham district since 2015, and incumbent Democrat Jeanette White, who had represented the Windham district since 2003, were both re-elected.

Vermont Senate Windham district Democratic primary election, 2018
Party	Candidate	Votes	%
Democratic	Becca Balint (incumbent)	4,697	37.82%
Democratic	Jeanette White (incumbent)	4,308	34.69%
Democratic	Wayne Vernon Estey	1,076	8.66%
Write-in	Total write-ins	26	0.21%
N/A	Overvotes	2	0.02%
N/A	Blank votes	2,311	18.61%
Total votes		12,420	100%

Vermont Senate Windham district general election, 2018
Party	Candidate	Votes	%
Democratic	Becca Balint (incumbent)	11,464	32.40%
Democratic	Jeanette White (incumbent)	10,644	30.08%
Republican	Tyler Colford	3,861	10.91%
Independent	Beverly Stone	1,675	4.73%
Liberty Union	Aaron Diamondstone	763	2.16%
Liberty Union	Jerry Levy	659	1.86%
N/A	Blanks	6,282	17.75%
N/A	Write-ins	35	0.10%
N/A	Overvotes	5	0.01%
Total votes		35,388	100%
Democratic hold			
Democratic hold			

=== Windsor ===
- Elects three senators.

Incumbent Democrats Alison Clarkson, who had represented the Windsor district since 2017, Richard McCormack, who had represented the Windsor district since 2007, and incumbent Democrat Alice Nitka, who had represented the Windsor district since 2007, were all re-elected.

Vermont Senate Windsor district election, 2018
Party	Candidate	Votes	%
Democratic	Alison Clarkson (incumbent)	15,091	18.62%
Democratic	Alice Nitka (incumbent)	14,276	17.61%
Democratic	Richard McCormack (incumbent)	13,591	16.76%
Republican	Randy A. Gray	7,183	8.86%
Republican	Wayne D. Townsend	6,882	8.49%
Republican	Jack Williams	6,389	7.88%
Independent	Mason Wade	2,055	2.53%
N/A	Blanks	15,518	19.14%
N/A	Write-ins	65	0.08%
N/A	Overvotes	19	0.02%
Total votes		81,069	100%
Democratic hold			
Democratic hold			
Democratic hold			

== See also ==
- 2018 United States elections
- 2018 Vermont elections
- 2018 United States Senate election in Vermont
- 2018 United States House of Representatives election in Vermont
- 2018 Vermont gubernatorial election
- 2018 Vermont House of Representatives election
