= James McNeil =

American politician (born 1958)

Member of the Vermont Senate from the Rutland district
- In office January 9, 2019 – January 6, 2021 Serving with Brian Collamore and Cheryl Hooker
- Preceded by: Peg Flory; David Soucy
- Succeeded by: Joshua Terenzini

Member of the Vermont House of Representatives from the Rutland 4 district
- In office January 1989 – January 2013
- Preceded by: David Sunderland
- Succeeded by: Thomas Terenzini

Personal details
- Born: July 24, 1958 (age 68) Rutland City, Vermont
- Party: Republican
- Spouse: Lori Ann Creaser (m. 1979)
- Children: 2
- Education: Champlain College (AS)

James McNeil (born July 24, 1958) is an American businessman and politician who served as a Republican Party member of the Vermont House of Representatives from 2008 to 2013 and the Vermont Senate from 2019 to 2021.

== Early life and education ==
James L. McNeil was born in Rutland City, Vermont on July 24, 1958, a son of James F. McNeil and Jane (Masan) McNeil. He attended St. Peter's Elementary School and graduated from Mount Saint Joseph Academy. McNeil went on to complete an associate of science degree in general business at Champlain College in 1978.

== Career ==
McNeil went into the men's clothing business, and for more than 40 years has been co-owner with his twin brother John of McNeil & Reedy, a Rutland City store that sells men's suits, shoes, and other apparel, and rents tuxedos and other formal wear. A Republican, Reedy served on the Rutland Town Selectboard for four years, in addition to serving as a justice of the peace and a notary public.

A civic activist, McNeil served on the board of the Rutland City Downtown Partnership for four years, and also served on the board of directors of the Rutland Area Visiting Nurse Association. In addition, he served on the Business Advisory Board for the Rutland High School's Stafford Technical Center and Rutland's Christ the King School Board. McNeil is also a former Boy Scouts of America troop leader.

In 2008, McNeil was appointed to the Vermont House of Representatives, filling the seat left vacant by the resignation of David Sunderland. He was elected to a full term in 2008, and reelected in 2010. McNeil served from January 1989 to January 2013, and was a member of the House Agriculture Committee.

In 2018, incumbent Republican Margaret Flory was not a candidate for reelection to the Vermont Senate from the three-member at-large Rutland County District. Incumbent Republicans Brian Collamore and David Soucy ran for reelection, and the other Republican candidates included McNeil, Ed Larson, and Terry Williams. In the August primary, the three Republican nominations were won by Collamore, McNeil, and Larson.

In the November general election, the three top finishers were Collamore, McNeil, and Democrat Cheryl Hooker. McNeil started his Senate term in January 2019, and was appointed to the Education and Transportation Committees. In addition, he was named to the Joint Legislative Justice Oversight Committee, Legislative Council Committee, and Advisory Council on Child Poverty and Strengthening Families.

== Personal life ==
In 1979, McNeil married Lori Ann Creaser of Ludlow. They have two children.

== Sources ==
- "Biography, Senator James McNeil". legislature.vermont.gov. Montpelier, VT: Vermont General Assembly. 2019.

=== Newspapers ===
- "Wedding Announcement, Lori Ann Creaser and James L. McNeil". Burlington Free Press. Burlington, VT. November 7, 1979. p. 8 – via Newspapers.com.
- "Obituary, Jane M. McNeil". Rutland Herald. Rutland, VT. August 5, 2011. p. B2 – via Newspapers.com.
- "Longtime State Lawmaker Peg Flory Announces Retirement". Burlington Free Press. Burlington, VT. Associated Press. March 29, 2018. p. A15 – via Newspapers.com.
- Dritschilo, Gordon (August 10, 2018). "GOP Senate Hopefuls Make Pitch". Rutland Herald. Rutland, VT. p. A1 – via Newspapers.com.
- Dritschilo, Gordon (August 18, 2018). "Write-Ins Put Dems On Ballot". Rutland Herald. Rutland, VT. p. A1 – via Newspapers.com.
- Dritschilo, Gordon (November 7, 2018). "Collamore, Hooker and McNeil Win". Rutland Herald. Rutland, VT. p. A1 – via Newspapers.com.
