= Terry Williams (politician) =

American politician from Vermont

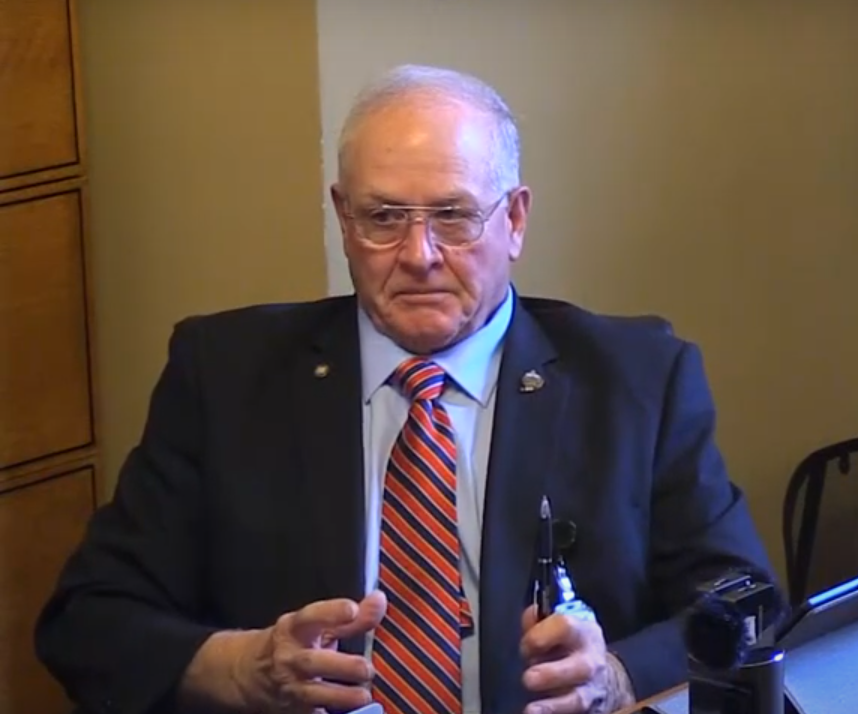
- Williams in 2023

Member of the Vermont Senate
- incumbent
- Assumed office January 4, 2023 Serving with Brian Collamore, Dave Weeks
- Preceded by: Brian Collamore, Cheryl Hooker, Joshua Terenzini
- Constituency: Rutland district

Personal details
- Born: 1952 (age 73–74) Rutland, Vermont, US
- Party: Republican
- Spouse: Serena Hewes (m. 1973)
- Children: 3
- Education: New Hampshire Technical College; Excelsior University
- Occupation: Farmer

Military service
- Service: United States Army
- Years of service: 1973–2004
- Rank: Lieutenant Colonel
- Unit: Vermont Army National Guard
- Wars: Operation Enduring Freedom
- Awards: Bronze Star Medal; Meritorious Service Medal; Army Commendation Medal; Army Achievement Medal; Vermont Commendation Medal

Terry Williams (born 1952) is an American politician from the state of Vermont who has represented the Rutland district in the Vermont Senate since January 2023.

== Early life ==
Terry K. Williams was born in Rutland, Vermont in 1952, a son of William G. Williams and Josephine (Sbardella) Williams. He was raised and educated in Poultney. He graduated from Poultney High School in 1970 and received an associate degree from New Hampshire Technical College in 1972. He later received his Bachelor of Arts degree from Regents College (now Excelsior University).

== Career ==
From 1972 through 1980, Williams worked as an automotive technician and he was a Vermont State Deputy Game Warden from 1978 to 1990. He enlisted in the Vermont Army National Guard in 1973 and served until 1979 when he was honorably discharged so he could accept his commission as a second lieutenant. He was an Armor officer from 1979 until retiring from the military in 2004, and was a member of the Active Guard Reserve program for 22 years. He retired as a lieutenant colonel, and his career included deployment to Afghanistan during Operation Enduring Freedom. Williams's awards and decorations included the Bronze Star Medal, Meritorious Service Medal, Army Commendation Medal, Army Achievement Medal, and Vermont Commendation Medal.

A Republican, Williams served on Poultney's selectboard, including appointment as the board's vice chairman. He was also a member of the Rutland Regional Planning Commission and the board of directors of the Dodge House Veterans Assistance Office. He is a member of the Veterans of Foreign Wars and American Legion, and is a life member of Disabled American Veterans.

Williams is a life member of the National Rifle Association and has served as vice president of the Vermont Federation of Sportsman's Clubs. He has also served as a director of the Federation Fund for Conservation and Training and is a member of Gun Owners of Vermont. Williams continues to live in Poultney, where he operates Slate Hill Farm, an enterprise previously owned by his grand-aunt and grand-uncle. Previously married to Serena Hewes, he is the father of three adult children and grandfather of five.

== Vermont Senate ==
Williams ran unsuccessfully for the Republican nomination for the Vermont Senate in 2018. He was nominated in 2020, but was unsuccessful in the general election. He was elected in 2022, and reelected in 2024.

In the state senate, Williams's committee assignments included Education (clerk), Natural Resources and Energy (vice chair), Canvassing, and Judicial Retention. In addition, he has been a member of the Water Quality, Lake Classification, and Antidegradation Study Group.

== Arrest ==
On October 27, 2026, Williams was arrested and jailed on a domestic assault charge after Vermont State Police received a report that he had "caused pain and injury to a household member". Williams was placed in custody and taken to the Rutland State Police barracks for processing. He was then taken to the Rutland jail on $500 bail.

Williams pleaded not guilty on October 28 and was released with no bail but with conditions, including that he not contact his daughter. Documents presented at his initial hearing indicated that Williams's adult daughter had been living with him since July, and that he struck her during an argument on October 27. According to Williams's daughter, Williams told her "I should have punched you 40 years ago" before hitting her with an open hand. According to police, her face was scratched, and Williams claimed she approached him and he pushed her, which resulted in an injury to his finger.
