= Joshua Terenzini =

American politician from Vermont

Member of the Vermont Senate from the Rutland district
- In office January 6, 2021 – January 4, 2023 Serving with Brian Collamore and Cheryl Hooker
- Preceded by: James McNeil
- Succeeded by: Terry Williams; Dave Weeks

Personal details
- Born: 1987 (age 38–39) Rutland, Vermont
- Party: Republican
- Spouse: Jessica Terenzini
- Children: 4

Joshua C. Terenzini (born 1987) is an American politician serving as a member of the Vermont Senate from the Rutland-4 district. Elected in November 2020, he assumed office on January 6, 2021.

== Background ==
Terenzini was born and raised in Rutland, Vermont. Terenzini served on the Rutland Town Selectboard for 10 years and was also a volunteer member of the Rutland Fire Department. Terenzini is a district sales manager at a Mattress Firm branch location. Terenzini was elected to the Vermont Senate in November 2020 and assumed office on January 6, 2021.
