= Senator Hooker =

Senator Hooker may refer to:

- Cheryl Hooker (born 1950), Vermont State Senate
- S. Percy Hooker (1860–1915), New York State Senate
