= Chris Mattos =

American politician

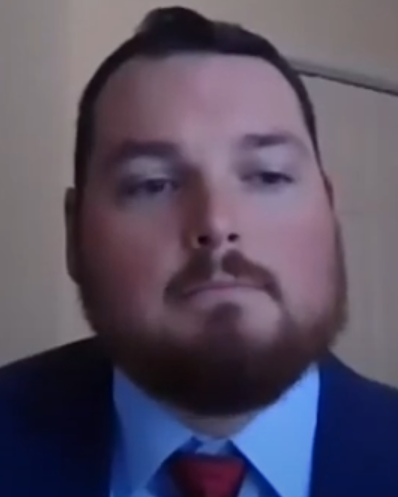
- Mattos in 2021

Member of the Vermont Senate from the Chittenden-North district
- Incumbent
- Assumed office January 8, 2025
- Preceded by: Irene Wrenner

Member of the Vermont House of Representatives from the Chittenden-10 district
- In office 2017 – January 8, 2025
- Preceded by: Ronald Hubert
- Succeeded by: Anthony Micklus

Personal details
- Born: Burlington, Vermont, U.S.
- Party: Republican
- Education: University of Vermont

Chris Mattos is an American politician who represented the Chittenden-10 district in the Vermont House of Representatives beginning in 2017.

In 2024, Mattos was elected to the Vermont Senate from the Chittenden-North Vermont Senate District.
