= Robert H. Weeks =

American politician (1930–2008)

Member of the Vermont House of Representatives from the Rutland-4 district
- In office 2001–2002

Member of the Vermont House of Representatives from the Rutland-4 district
- In office 1995–1996

Personal details
- Born: Robert Hart Weeks; April 1, 1930 Long Island, New York, US
- Died: October 5, 2008 (aged 78) Wallingford, Vermont, US
- Party: Republican
- Spouse: Geraldine 'Gerry' Weeks (Backensto)
- Children: 5
- Relatives: Mark A. Weeks (Son); Richard L. Weeks (Son); Carol A. Murphy (Daughter); Dean A. Weeks (Son); Dave Weeks (Son)
- Education: Rensselaer Polytechnic Institute (BA); University of Utah (MBA)

Military service
- Allegiance: United States
- Branch/service: United States Navy
- Years of service: 1951–1975
- Rank: Captain
- Battles/wars: Cold War
- Awards: Meritorious Service Medal; Meritorious Unit Commendation; Navy Expeditionary Medal; Navy Occupation Service Medal; National Defence Service Medal, 2 awards Submarine Warfare Insignia; SSBN Deterrent Patrol insignia, 11 awards Command at Sea insignia

Robert Hart Weeks (April 1, 1930 – October 5, 2008) was an American politician, U.S. Navy Captain, and businessman who served in the Vermont House of Representatives representing the town of Wallingford. A Republican, Weeks was originally elected to the Vermont House of Representatives in 1994 and was reelected in 2000.

== Military career ==
In 1966, Weeks commissioned and took command of the USS Henry L. Stimson (SSBN-655) Gold Crew, a nuclear fleet ballistic missile submarine. At the time, he was the youngest officer ever to command a ballistic missile submarine. He spent five years commanding the Stimson, conducting Cold War strategic deterrent patrols in the Northern Atlantic and the Mediterranean.

== Political career ==
Weeks was first elected to the Vermont House of Representatives in 1994, he served as a member and as the Clerk of the Transportation Committee in his first two-year term and as a member of the Institutions/Corrections Committee in his second two-year term. He primarily ran on a platform of lower taxes, fiscal responsibility and job creation.

== Personal life ==
Robert was born April 1, 1930 in the Village of Bayshore NY. The son of Walter W. Weeks and Laura Alberta (Hart) Weeks. He married Geraldine A. Backensto on June 8, 1952. They moved to Vermont in 1975. Together they had five children and seven grandchildren. His son Dave Weeks serves in the Vermont Senate representing Rutland County.
