= Chittenden-North (Vermont Senate district) =

The Chittenden-North Vermont Senate District is a Vermont Senate election district. It was fielded after the 2022 U.S. Census, when legislators decided to create several new districts out of the Chittenden district, which had elected six members at-large.

Chittenden-North consists of part of the town of Essex, all of Milton, and all of Westford in Chittenden County, and the town of Fairfax in Franklin County.

The Chittenden-North district elects one state senator. In 2022, the general election winner was Irene Wrenner. In 2024, Chris Mattos defeated Wrenner's reelection bid.
