= David Soucy =

American politician and golfer (born 1957)

Member of the Vermont House of Representatives from the Washington-Orange district
- Incumbent
- Assumed office April 9, 2026 Serving with Gina Galfetti
- Preceded by: Topper McFaun

Member of the Vermont Senate from the Rutland district
- In office 2017–2019
- Preceded by: Kevin J. Mullin
- Succeeded by: James McNeil

Personal details
- Born: 1957 (age 68–69) Portland, Maine, U.S.
- Party: Republican
- Education: Marist College
- Occupation: professional golfer

David Soucy (born 1957) is an American politician. He is a Republican member of the Vermont's House of Representatives representing the Washington-Orange district.

== Early life and education ==
Born in Portland, Maine, Soucy graduated from South Portland High School. He attended Marist College. Soucy has been a resident of Vermont since 1997.

== Career ==
Soucy was a Republican member of the Vermont Senate representing the Rutland District from 2017 to 2019. He was appointed to the State Senate by Governor Phil Scott.

He is a former professional golfer. Soucy serves as the head golf professional at the Country Club of Barre, in Barre, Vermont. Soucy is a member of the Barre Town Selectboard.

In 2026 he was appointed to the House of Representatives by Governor Phil Scott to fill a seat vacated by Topper McFaun.
