= Dave Weeks =

American Politician from Vermont

David H. Weeks
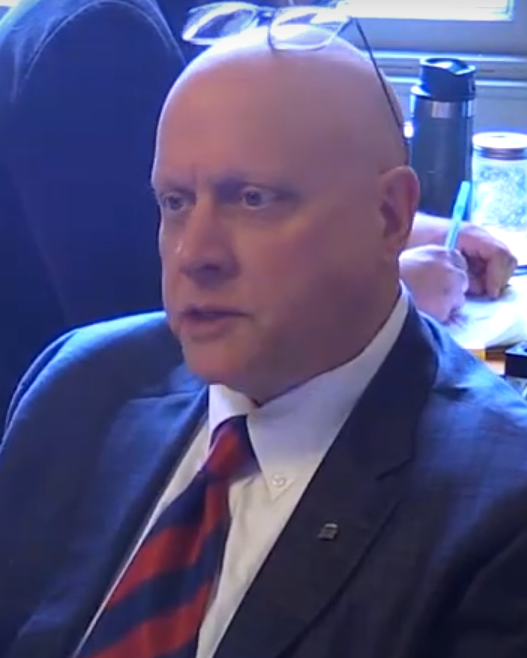
- Weeks in 2023

Member of the Vermont Senate from the Rutland district
- Incumbent
- Assumed office January 4, 2023 Serving with Brian Collamore and Terry Williams
- Preceded by: Cheryl Hooker; Joshua Terenzini

Personal details
- Born: David Hart Weeks; December 21, 1960 (age 65) Gales Ferry, Connecticut, US
- Party: Republican
- Spouse: Leeanne M. Wootten
- Children: Jacob B. Weeks; Sarah A. Weeks
- Relatives: Robert H. Weeks (Father); Gerry Weeks (Mother)
- Education: University of Vermont (BA); University of San Diego (MBA); Villanova University (MPA); Army War College (MA)
- Website: Campaign website Official website

Military service
- Allegiance: United States
- Branch/service: United States Navy
- Years of service: 1982-1985 (US Marines Enlisted); 1985–1997 (US Navy Active Officer); 1997–2013 (US Navy Reserve Officer)
- Rank: US Navy Captain; USMC Corporal
- Battles/wars: Iraq War; Cold War
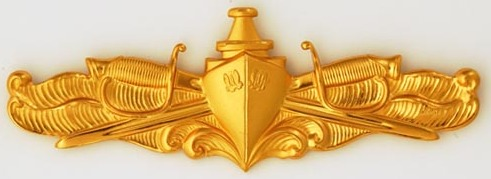
- Awards: Legion of Merit; Meritorious Service Medal, 4 awards Navy Commendation Medal, 7 awards Navy Achievement Medal, 3 awards Presidential Unit Citation; Navy Unit Commendation; Coast Guard Unit Commendation, with Operational device Meritorious Unit Commendation, 2 awards Navy E Ribbon, 4 awards USMC Selected Reserve Medal; National Defense Service Medal, 2 awards Armed Forces Expeditionary Medal; Southwest Asia Service Medal, 2 awards Iraq Campaign Medal, 3 awards Global War on Terrorism Expeditionary Medal; Global War on Terrorism Service Medal; Korean Defense Service Medal; Humanitarian Service Medal; Outstanding Volunteer Service Medal; Sea Service Ribbon, 7 awards Overseas Service Ribbon, 5 awards Coast Guard Special Operations Service Ribbon; Armed Forces Reserve Medal, 3 Mobilization devices Marksmanship Medal, for pistol and rifle Marine Expert Rifleman Insignia; Marine Expert Pistol Insignia Surface Warfare Officer Insignia Surface Warfare Insignia; Command Ashore Insignia; Combat Craft Insignia; Vermont Distinguished Service Medal; Vermont Veterans Medal

David Hart Weeks (born December 21, 1960) is an American politician, retired U.S. Navy Captain, and businessman who serves as the Vermont state senator from Rutland. A Republican, Weeks was elected to the Vermont Senate in 2022 and 2024, as one of three at-large senators representing the Rutland County Senate district.

== Early life and education ==
The youngest of five siblings, Weeks was born on December 21, 1960, on the US Submarine Base near Gales Ferry, Connecticut, the son of Geraldine A. Backensto and Robert H. Weeks. His father was a U.S. Navy Captain, submariner, and businessman who served two terms in the Vermont House of Representatives from Wallingford.

David graduated from Mill River Union High School and is a graduate of the University of Vermont, where he received a Bachelor of Arts degree in Computer Science. He later received an MBA in Project Management from University of San Diego as a Teplitz fellow, a Master of Strategic Studies from the Army War College, and a Master of Public Administration from Villanova University. David initiated PhD studies at King's College London focusing on a national security question.

== Military career ==
Weeks first enlisted in the U.S. Marines Company B, 1st BN, 25th Marines. After graduation, he joined the U.S. Navy where his service included the Chief Engineer on the USS Mobile Bay. In 1997 he transitioned to the United States Navy Reserve. In the wake of the September 11 attacks, he was mobilized and deployed overseas three times, including to the Iraq/Kuwait border, where he took part in the 2003 invasion of Iraq. He retired from the U.S. Navy in 2013 as a Captain.

== Business career ==
Weeks transitioned from the active duty Navy in 1997 to pursue a career in business. He has held various high-level program management positions in the defense and security sectors within the United States, Europe, East Asia, and Middle East. He specialized in leading commercial high-tech, internationally sensitive projects valued in the billions.

== Political career ==
Weeks won the Vermont Senate Primary election on August 11, 2026. He was elected to the Vermont Senate in 2022 and 2024, as one of three at-large senators representing the Rutland County Senate district. He ran on an economic platform focusing on economic and infrastructure development.

He is the Vice Chair of the Senate Education Committee, Senate Economic Development and Housing Committee, Legislative Committee on Rules (LCAR), School Construction Task Force, State Aid to School Construction Working Group, VT Webportal Board, Veterans Affairs and National Guard Caucus, New England Legislative Delegation to Taiwan, Former Vice Chair of the Senate Health/Welfare Committee, and the Education Committee of Conference.

== Personal life ==
Weeks lives in Proctor, Vermont with his wife, Leeanne Wootten. He has two adult children, Jacob and Sarah Weeks.
