= Irene Wrenner =

American politician

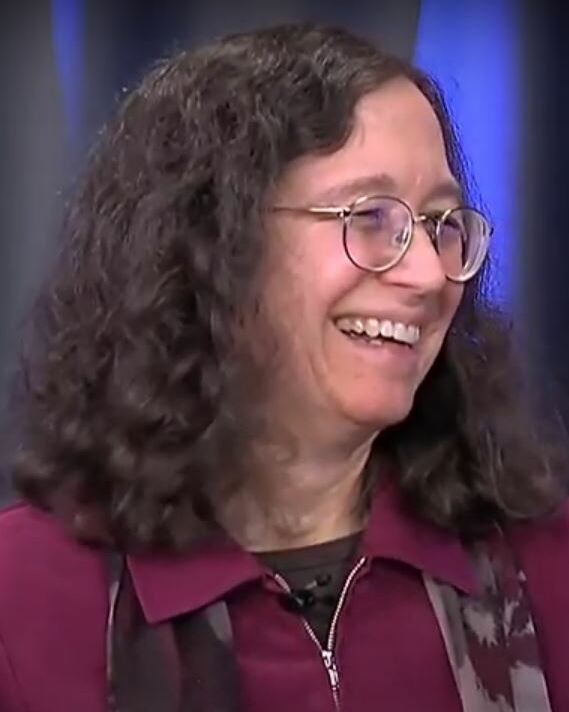
- Wrenner in 2022

Member of the Vermont Senate from the Chittenden-North Vermont Senate District district
- In office January 2023 – January 8, 2025
- Preceded by: Constituency established
- Succeeded by: Chris Mattos

Personal details
- Party: Democratic
- Irene Wrenner's voice Irene Wrenner introducing herself in a meeting of the Senate Agricultural committee Recorded February 21, 2024

Irene Wrenner is an American journalist and politician from the state of Vermont who represented the Chittenden-North Vermont Senate District for one term in the Vermont Senate, from January 2023 until January 2025. In November 2026, she was re-elected to the same seat. A member of the Democratic Party, she previously served on the Essex Board of Selectmen. She founded an online newspaper, the Essex ReTorter, in 2020.
