= Richard A. Westman =

American politician

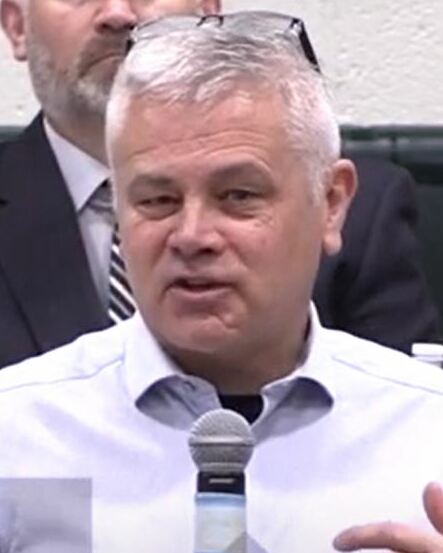
Westman in 2020

Richard A. Westman (born 1959) is a Republican politician who was elected and currently serves in the Vermont Senate. He previously served in the Vermont House of Representatives from 1982 until his election to the State Senate. He was a Representative of the Lamoille-4 Representative District. Since 2011, he has served as state senator for Lamoille district.

Vermont Senate
Preceded by Susan Bartlett	Member of the Vermont Senate from the Lamoille district 2011–present	Incumbent
