= Margaret Flory =

American politician (born 1948)

Member of the Vermont Senate from the Rutland district
- In office 2011–2019

Member of the Vermont House of Representatives from the Rutland-6 district
- In office 1999–2010

Personal details
- Born: August 2, 1948 (age 77) Colchester, Vermont, U.S.
- Party: Republican
- Occupation: Attorney

Margaret "Peg" Flory (born August 2, 1948) is a Republican politician who served in the Vermont Senate from 2011 until 2019, representing the Rutland District. From 1999 to 2010, she served in the Vermont House of Representatives, where she represented the Rutland-6 Representative District.

She did not seek reelection in 2018.
