= Cheryl Hooker =

American politician

Member of the Vermont Senate from the Rutland district
- In office January 9, 2019 – January 4, 2023
- Preceded by: Peg Flory; David Soucy
- Succeeded by: Terry Williams; Dave Weeks
- In office January 8, 1997 – January 6, 1999
- Preceded by: Betty M. Ferraro
- Succeeded by: John P. Crowley

Member of the Vermont House of Representatives from the Rutland 6-3 district
- In office January 3, 2001 – January 8, 2003
- Preceded by: Karen J. Moore
- In office January 6, 1993 – January 4, 1995
- Preceded by: Robert A. Stafford
- Succeeded by: Karen J. Moore

Personal details
- Born: Cheryl Mazzariello; February 15, 1950 (age 76) Rutland, Vermont
- Party: Democratic
- Spouse: George Hooker
- Children: 4
- Education: Castleton State College

Cheryl Mazzariello Hooker (born February 15, 1950) is an American politician. She has served in the Vermont Senate from the Rutland district since 2019. She previously served in the Vermont Senate from 1997 to 1999 and several terms in the Vermont House of Representatives.

== Biography ==
Cheryl Mazzariello Hooker is a lifelong resident of Rutland. She graduated from Mount Saint Joseph Academy and Castleton State College. She and her husband George have four children (Sam, Molly, Emily and T.J) and six grandchildren.

Hooker is a retired middle school and high schoolteacher and spends her time with family and friends and volunteers at the Rutland Free Library, The Rutland Community Cupboard, Rutland Dismas House and her church.

== Political career ==
From 1999 to 2002, Hooker served on the Rutland City Board of Aldermen. She also served in the Vermont House of Representatives (1990-1991, 1993–1995, 2000, 2001–2003) and Vermont Senate (1997-1999). In 2018, she was again elected to the Vermont Senate, and she was reelected in 2020.

Hooker serves as the Clerk of the Senate Committee on Economic Development, Housing, and General Affairs and as the Clerk of the Senate Committee on Institutions. She is a member of the Senate Sexual Harassment Panel. Hooker is one of three state senators serving on the Judicial Nominating Board.

In December 2020, Hooker was selected to serve as Majority Whip for the 2021-2022 session.
