= Rutland (Vermont Senate district) =

Coordinates: 43°35′N 73°00′W

The Rutland district is one of 16 districts of the Vermont Senate. The current district plan is included in the redistricting and reapportionment plan developed by the Vermont General Assembly following the 2020 U.S. census, which applies to legislatures elected in 2022, 2024, 2026, 2028, and 2030.

The Rutland district includes all of Rutland County except the town of Mount Holly, which is in the Windsor district.

== District senators ==
As of 2022

- Brian Collamore, Republican
- Dave Weeks, Republican
- Terry Williams, Republican

2005-2006

- Hull P. Maynard, Jr., Republican
- Kevin J. Mullin, Republican
- Wendy L. Wilton, Republican

2007-2008

- Bill Carris, Democrat
- Hull P. Maynard, Jr., Republican
- Kevin J. Mullin, Republican

As of 2017

- Brian Collamore, Republican
- Peg Flory, Republican
- Kevin J. Mullin, Republican

== Candidates for 2022 ==
The following information was obtained from the Vermont Secretary of State website.

| Democratic | Republican |
|---|---|
| Anna Tadio | Brian "BC" Collamore |
| Bridgette Remington | Dave Weeks |
| Joshua Fergusan | Terry Williams |

== Towns and cities in the Rutland district, 2012–2022 elections ==
=== Rutland County ===
- Benson
- Brandon
- Castleton
- Chittenden
- Clarendon
- Danby
- Fair Haven
- Hubbardton
- Ira
- Killington
- Mendon
- Middletown Springs
- Mount Tabor
- Pawlet
- Pittsfield
- Pittsford
- Poultney
- Proctor
- Rutland
- Rutland Town
- Shrewsbury
- Sudbury
- Tinmouth
- Wallingford
- Wells
- West Haven
- West Rutland

== Towns and cities in the Rutland district, 2002–2012 elections ==
=== Rutland County ===
- Benson
- Castleton
- Chittenden
- Clarendon
- Danby
- Fair Haven
- Hubbardton
- Ira
- Killington
- Mendon
- Middletown Springs
- Mount Holly
- Mount Tabor
- Pawlet
- Pittsfield
- Pittsford
- Poultney
- Proctor
- Rutland
- Rutland Town
- Shrewsbury
- Sudbury
- Tinmouth
- Wallingford
- Wells
- West Haven
- West Rutland

== See also ==
- Vermont Senate
