= Brian Collamore =

American politician

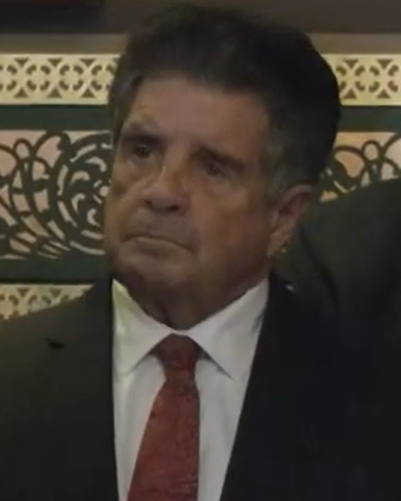
- Collamore in 2025

Member of the Vermont Senate from the Rutland district
- Incumbent
- Assumed office January 7, 2015 Serving with Terry Williams and Dave Weeks
- Preceded by: Eldred French

Personal details
- Born: November 28, 1950 (age 75) Detroit, Michigan, U.S.
- Party: Republican

Brian Collamore (born November 28, 1950) is an American politician who has served in the Vermont Senate from the Rutland district since 2015.
