= Choate =

Choate may refer to:

== Places ==
=== Canada ===
- Choate, British Columbia, a locality in the Fraser Canyon of British Columbia, Canada

=== United States ===
- Choate Mental Health and Development Center, a psychiatric hospital in Anna, Illinois
- Choate Rosemary Hall, a prep school in Wallingford, Connecticut
- Choate House (Massachusetts), a historic house on Choate Island in the Crane Wildlife Refuge, Essex, Massachusetts
- Choate Creek, a creek in Michigan
- Choate House (Pleasantville, New York), 1867 house converted into a private sanitarium
- Choate, Texas, a town
- Choate, Wisconsin, an unincorporated community
- Choateville, Kentucky, an unincorporated community

== Other uses ==
- Choate (law), a legal term
- Choate (surname)

== See also ==
- Choate, Hall & Stewart, Boston law firm
- Choate House (disambiguation)
