= Choate (surname) =

Choate is a surname. Notable people with the surname include:

- Anne Hyde Choate (1886–1967), early Girl Scout leader
- Charles Edward Choate (1865–1929), American architect
- Clyde L. Choate (1920–2001), American politician
- Don Choate (1938–2018), American professional baseball player
- Emett Clay Choate (1891–1974), American lawyer
- George Cheyne Shattuck Choate (1827–1896), American physician
- Helen Ashurst Choate (1882–1957), American botanist
- I. W. Choate (1882–1953), associate justice of the Montana Supreme Court
- Jeff Choate (born 1970), American football head coach for the Montana State Bobcats
- Joseph Hodges Choate (1832–1917), American lawyer and politician
- Joseph H. Choate Jr. (1876–1968), American lawyer
- Mark Choate, history professor at Brigham Young University
- Matthew Choate (born 1971), legislator in the Vermont senate
- Nathaniel Choate (1899–1965), American painter and sculptor
- Pat Choate (born 1941), American economist and politician
- Putt Choate (born 1956), American football linebacker
- Randy Choate (born 1975), American baseball pitcher
- Robert B. Choate Jr. (1924–2009), American businessman and political activist
- Rufus Choate (1799–1859), American lawyer and orator
- Tim Choate (1954–2004), American actor
- William Gardner Choate (1830–1920), United States federal judge
