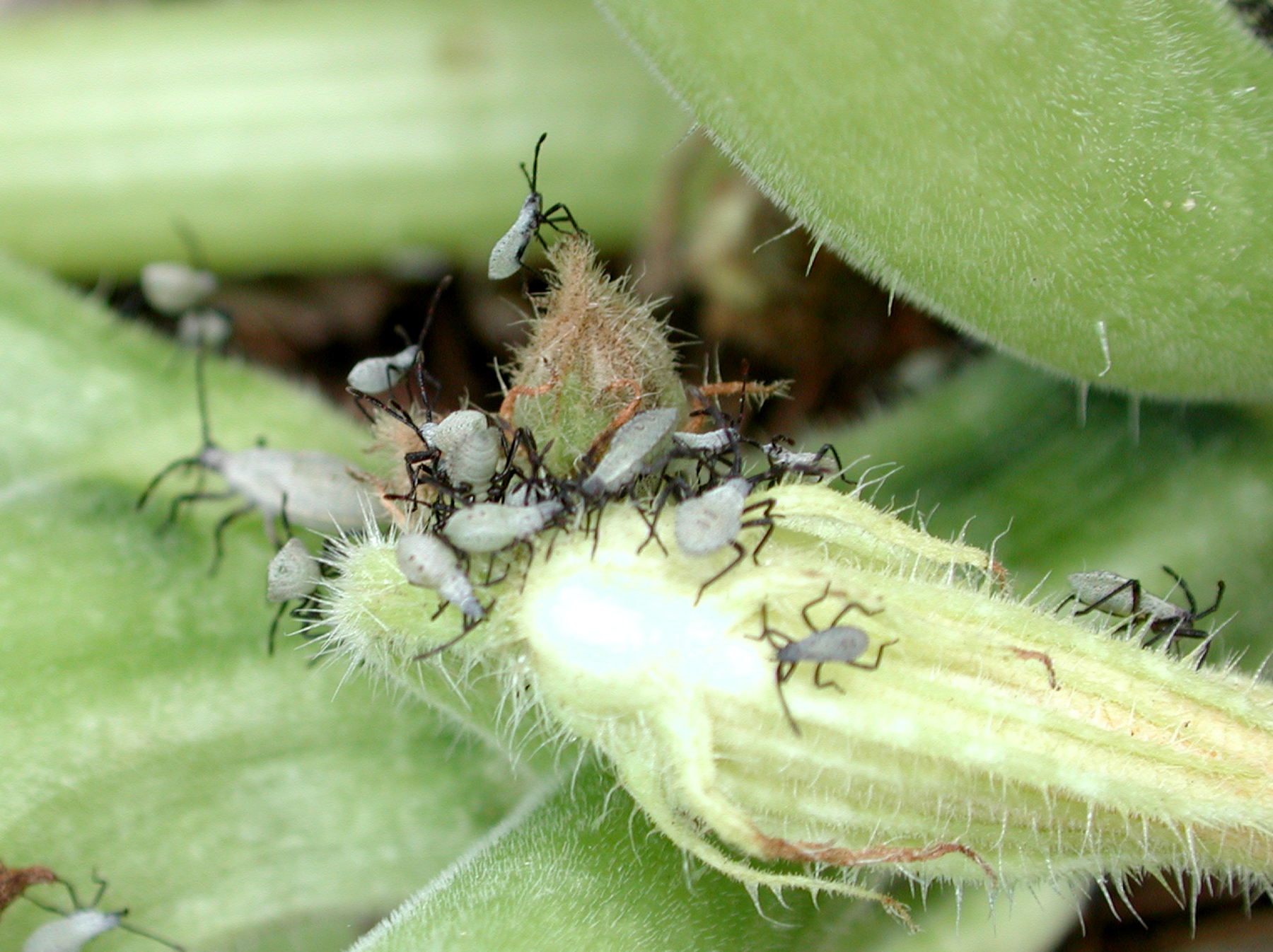
- Anasa tristis on a yellow summer squash plant

Scientific classification
- Domain: Eukaryota
- Kingdom: Animalia
- Phylum: Arthropoda
- Class: Insecta
- Order: Hemiptera
- Suborder: Heteroptera
- Family: Coreidae
- Subfamily: Coreinae
- Tribe: Coreini
- Genus: Anasa; Amyot & Serville, 1843

Synonyms
- Lagaria Dallas, 1852; Oriterus Hahn, 1831

= Anasa =

Genus of true bugs

Anasa is a genus of squash bugs in the family Coreidae. There are more than 70 described species in Anasa, found in North, Central, and South America.

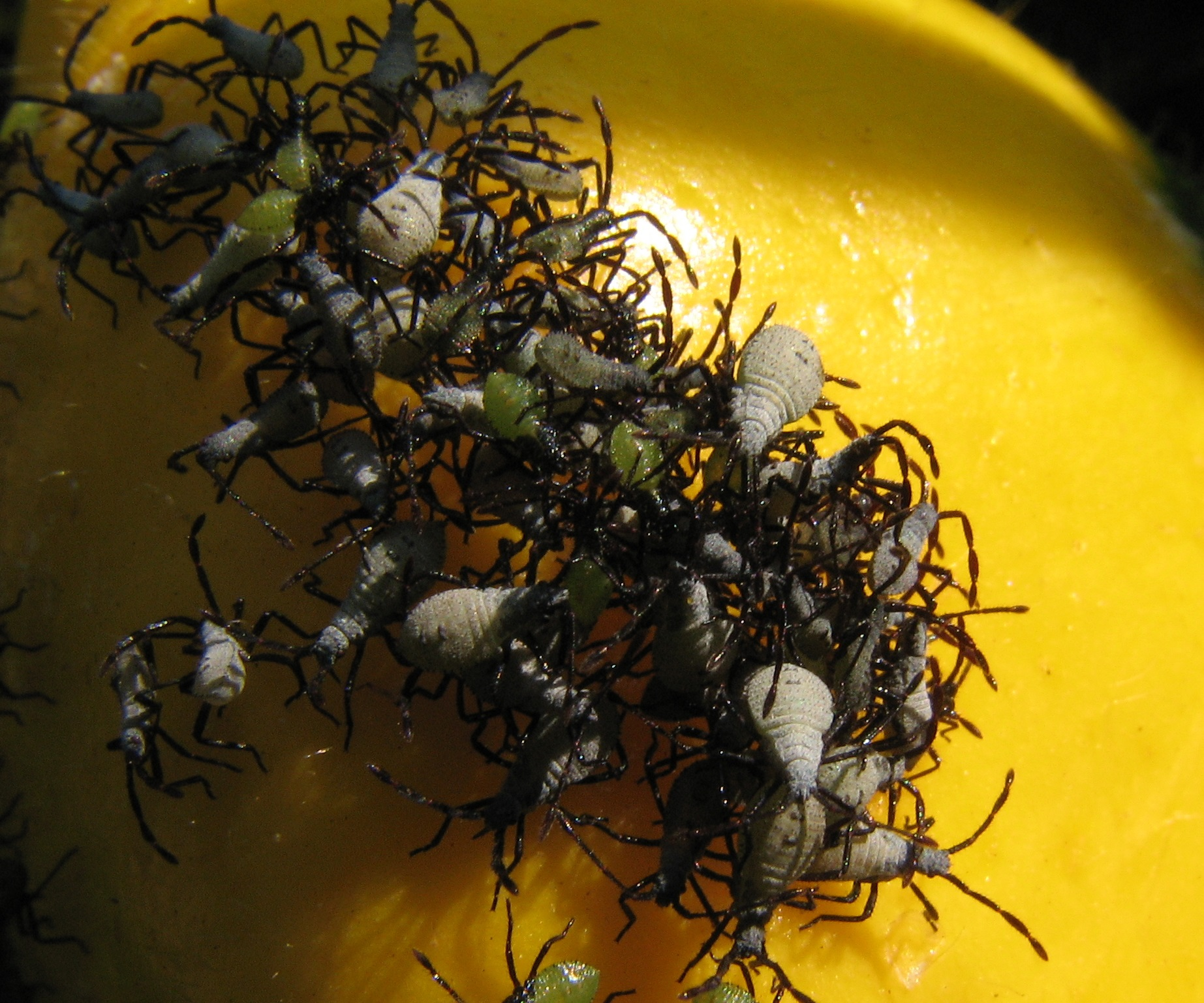
Anasa tristis nymphs of several instars, on squash

== Species ==
These 77 species belong to the genus Anasa:

- Anasa abdicata Brailovsky, 1985
- Anasa acutangula Stål, 1870
- Anasa albicans Brailovsky & Barrera, 2020
- Anasa alfaroi Brailovsky, 1982
- Anasa amazonica Brailovsky, 1985
- Anasa andresii (Guérin-Méneville, 1857)
- Anasa apicalis (Westwood, 1842)
- Anasa armigera (Say, 1825)
- Anasa auricularia Brailovsky, 1985
- Anasa bellator (Fabricius, 1787)
- Anasa byssoidecerus Brailovsky & Barrera, 2009
- Anasa capaneodes Stål, 1862
- Anasa cognatobellator Brailovsky, 1985
- Anasa conspersa Stål, 1862
- Anasa cornuta Amyot & Serville, 1843
- Anasa costalis Stål, 1870
- Anasa cotopaxiana Brailovsky, 2017
- Anasa crinita Brailovsky, 2017
- Anasa decretoria Distant, 1892
- Anasa delibata Distant, 1892
- Anasa denticulata Stål, 1870
- Anasa discifera Stål, 1870
- Anasa erratica Brailovsky, 1990
- Anasa flavovittata Distant, 1881
- Anasa fusca Stål, 1870
- Anasa fuscopunctata Brailovsky, 1985
- Anasa guayaquila Brailovsky, 1985
- Anasa guttifera Berg, 1879
- Anasa haglundi Stål, 1870
- Anasa hesperia Brailovsky, 1985
- Anasa humerata Brailovsky, 2017
- Anasa hylata Brailovsky, 1985
- Anasa impictipes Stål, 1870
- Anasa incompta Brailovsky, 1985
- Anasa intrusa Brailovsky, 1990
- Anasa jamaicensis Brailovsky, 2008
- Anasa jucunda Breddin, 1904
- Anasa kenti Brailovsky, 1985
- Anasa linnavuorii Brailovsky, 2016
- Anasa lita Distant, 1881
- Anasa litigiosa Stål, 1862
- Anasa lunicollis Stål, 1855
- Anasa maculipes Stål, 1862
- Anasa maculiventris Stål, 1854
- Anasa madida Distant, 1881
- Anasa marginella Blöte, 1935
- Anasa micans Brailovsky, 1985
- Anasa mimetica Brailovsky, 1985
- Anasa montevidensis Berg, 1883
- Anasa nigricollis Stål, 1870
- Anasa nigripes Stål, 1868
- Anasa notatipennis Stål, 1862
- Anasa onorei Brailovsky & Barrera, 2009
- Anasa paveli Brailovsky & Barrera, 2008
- Anasa pelaezi Brailovsky, 1982
- Anasa peregrina Distant, 1881
- Anasa permutata Brailovsky, 1985
- Anasa perplexa Brailovsky, 1985
- Anasa pisina Brailovsky, 2001
- Anasa pseudonigripes Brailovsky, 1990
- Anasa rapax Brailovsky & Barrera, 2009
- Anasa rectanguliformis Brailovsky, 1985
- Anasa repetita Heidemann, 1905
- Anasa ruficornis Stål, 1870
- Anasa rufolimbata Brailovsky, 1985
- Anasa scitula Brailovsky & Barrera, 2000
- Anasa scorbutica (Fabricius, 1775)
- Anasa siblica Brailovsky, 1985
- Anasa sinuaticollis Blöte, 1935
- Anasa stysi Brailovsky & Barrera, 2008
- Anasa subobscura Distant, 1881
- Anasa tauriformis Distant, 1881
- Anasa tenebricosa Distant, 1881
- Anasa trilineata Stål, 1870
- Anasa tristis (De Geer, 1773)
- Anasa uhleri Stål, 1868
- Anasa umbrina Brailovsky, 1985
- Anasa varicornis (Westwood, 1842)
- Anasa versicolor Distant, 1892
- Anasa vittiventris Stål, 1870
- †Anasa priscoputida Scudder, 1890
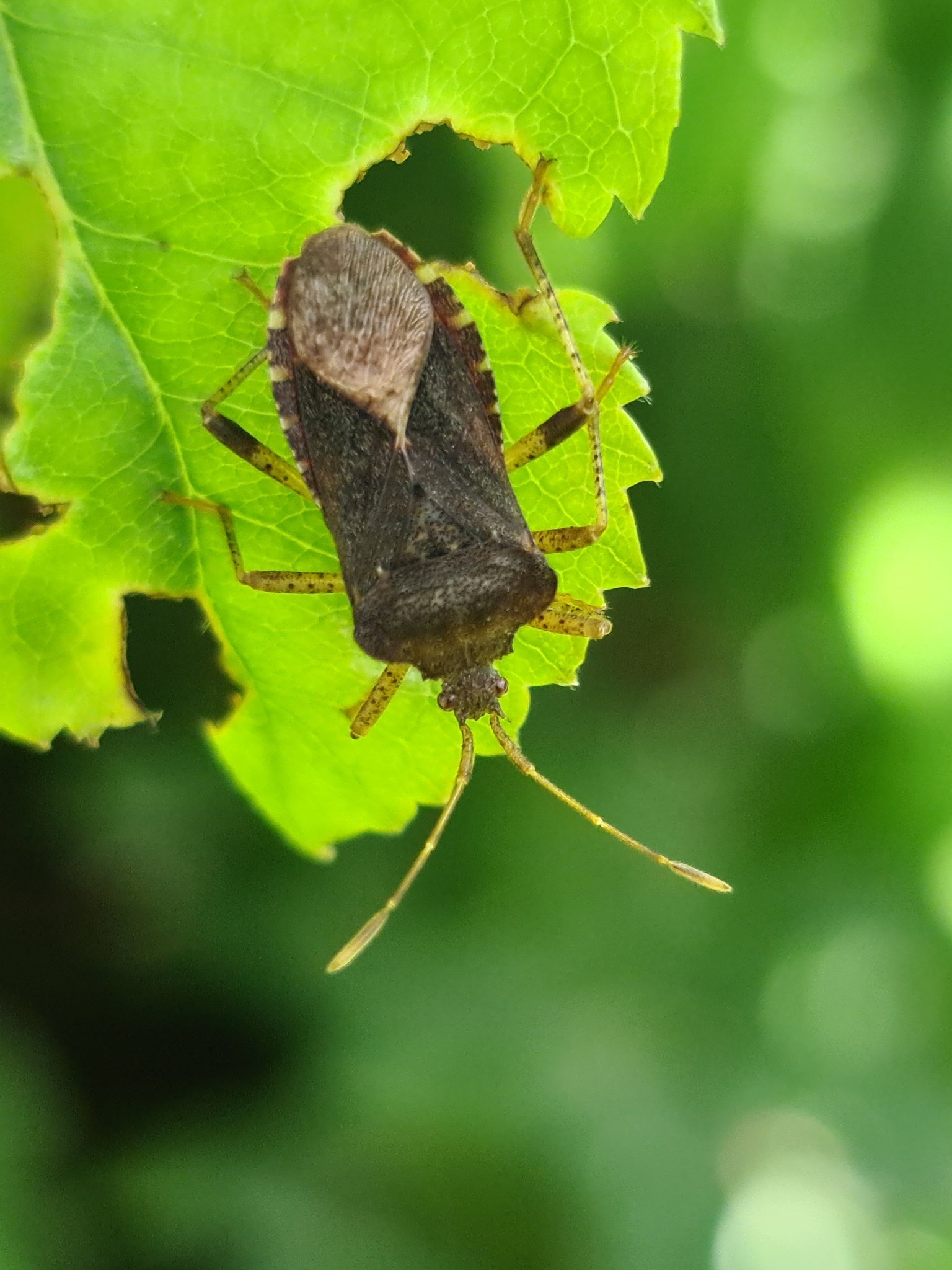
Anasa albicans, Argentina

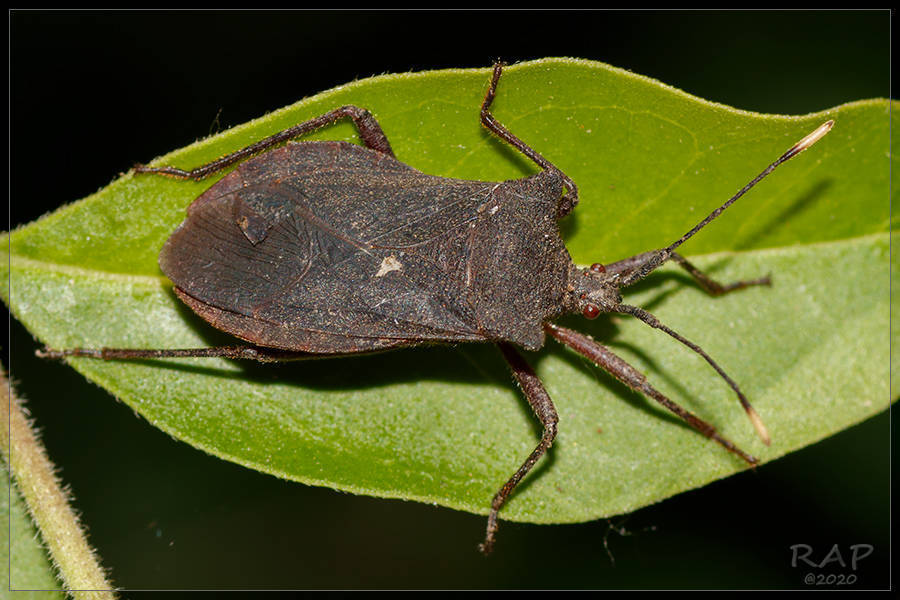
Anasa apicalis, Argentina

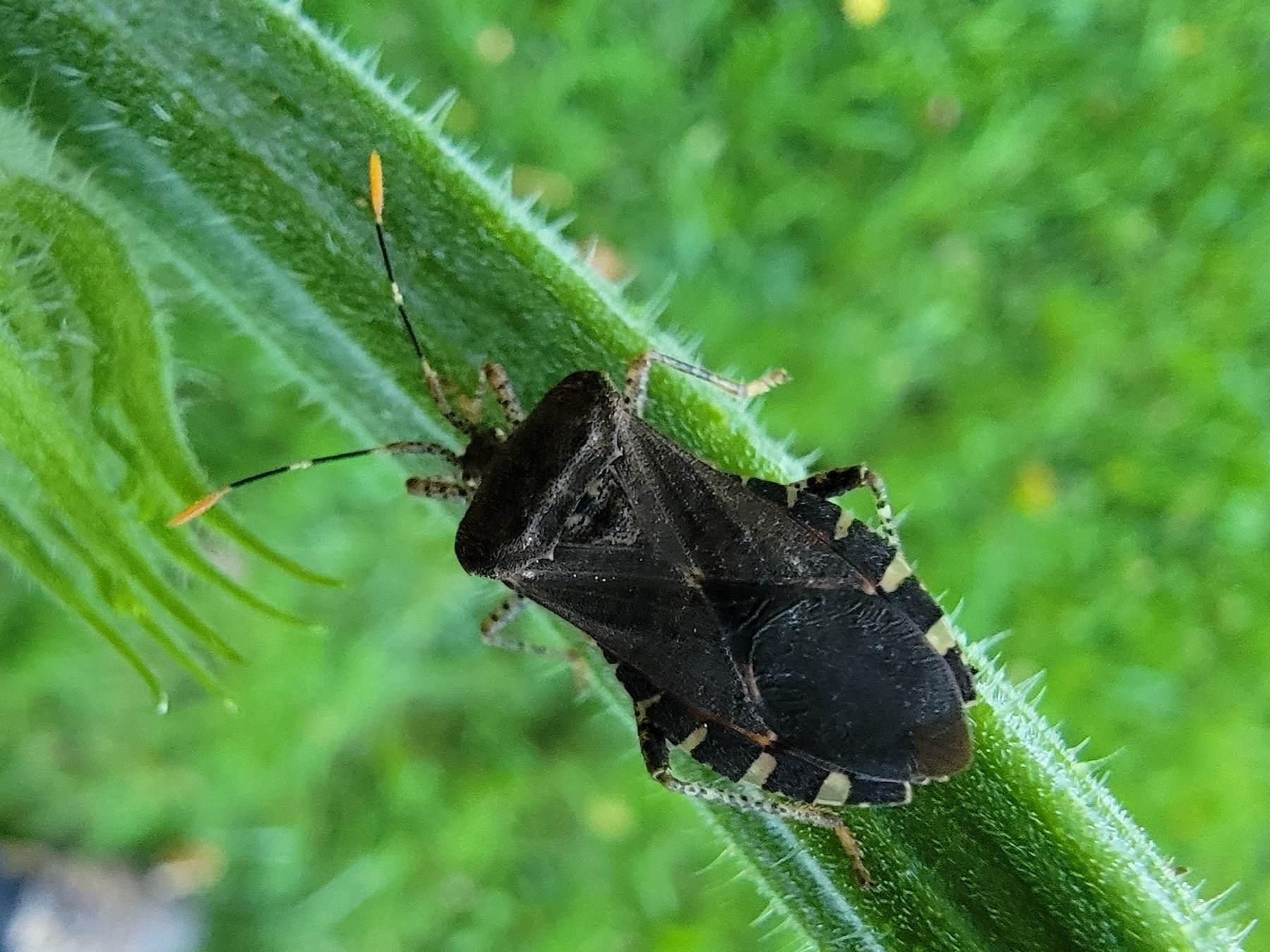
Anasa armigera, Maryland

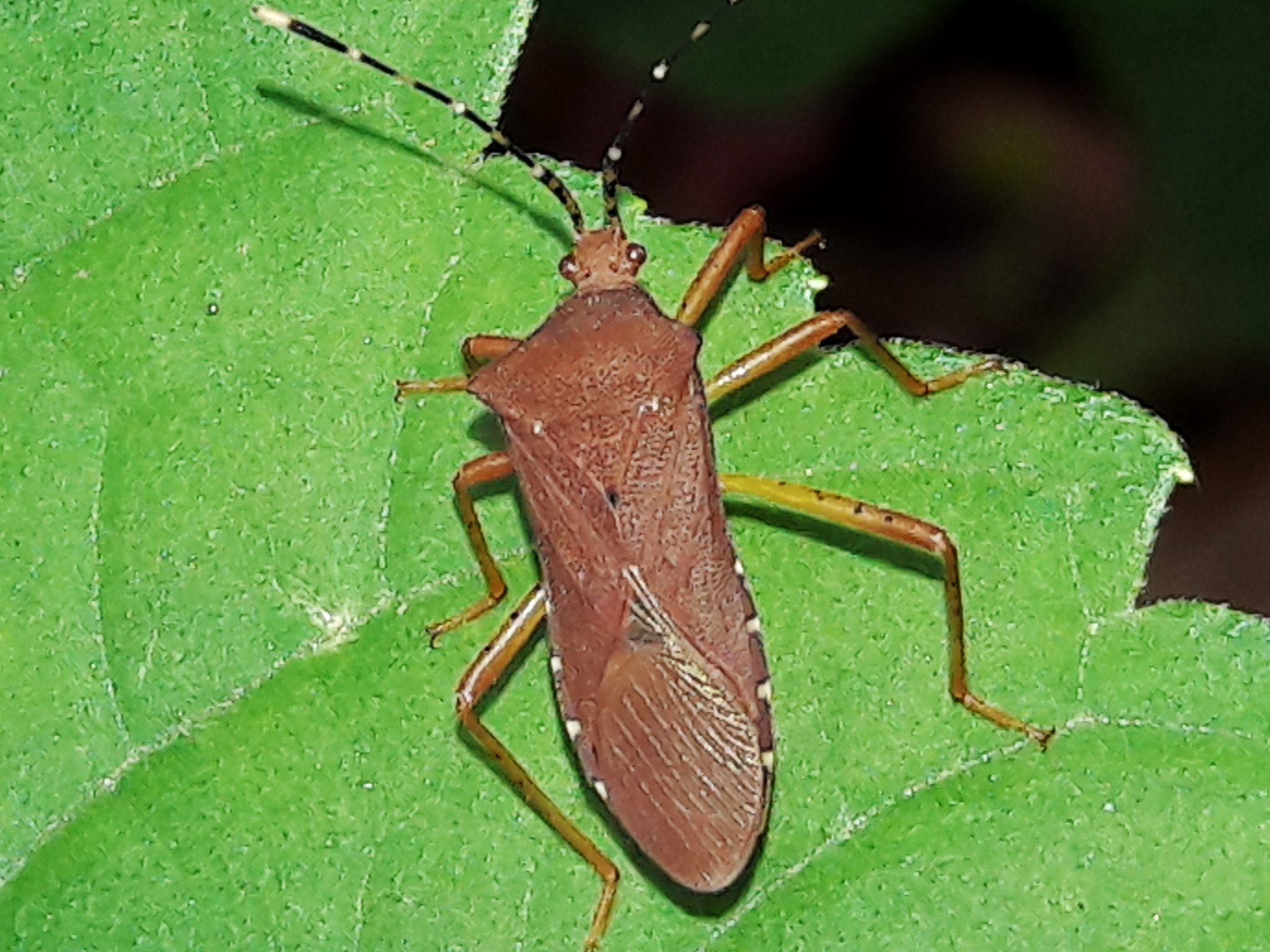
Anasa bellator, Brasil

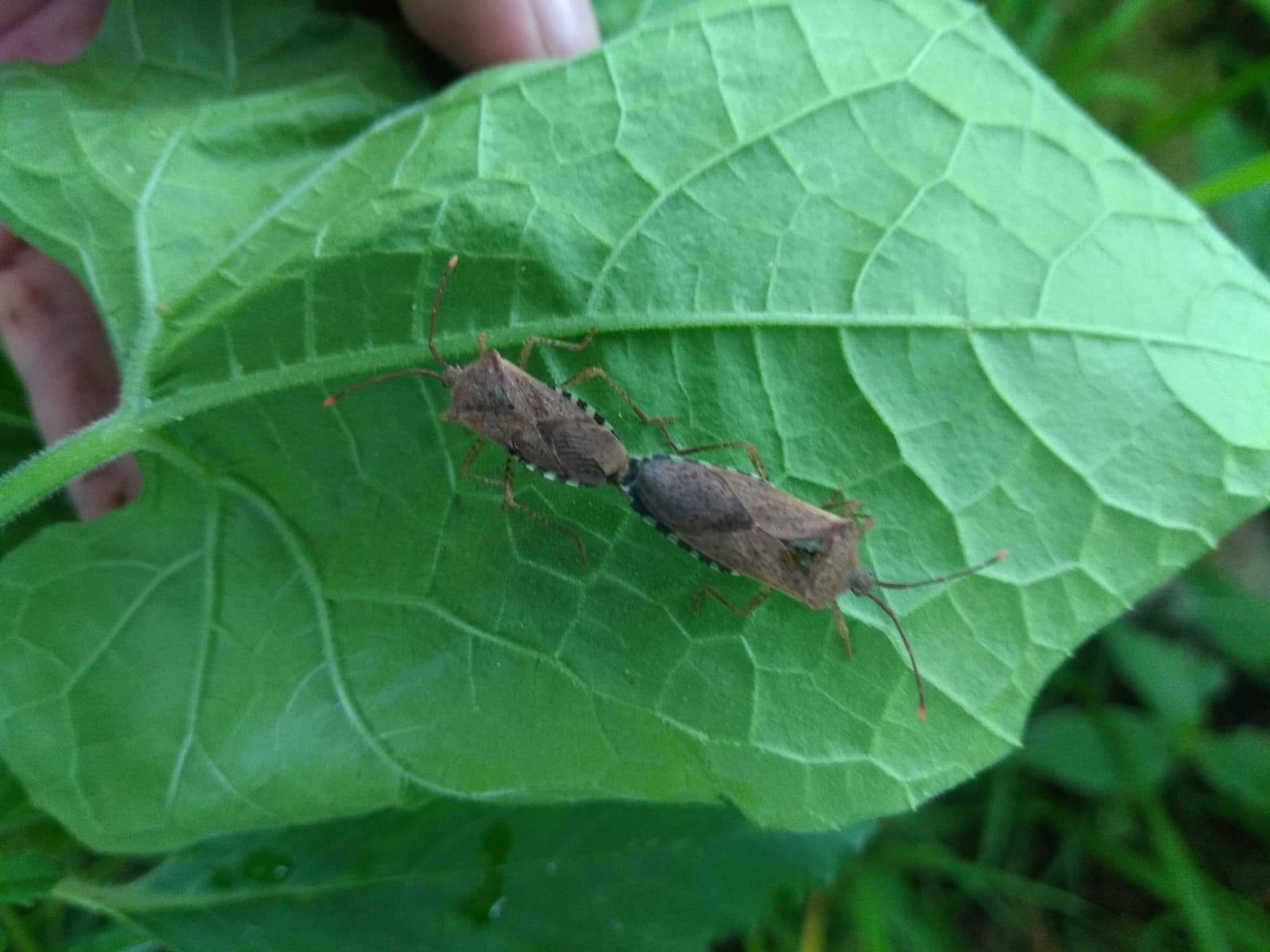
Anasa conspersa, México

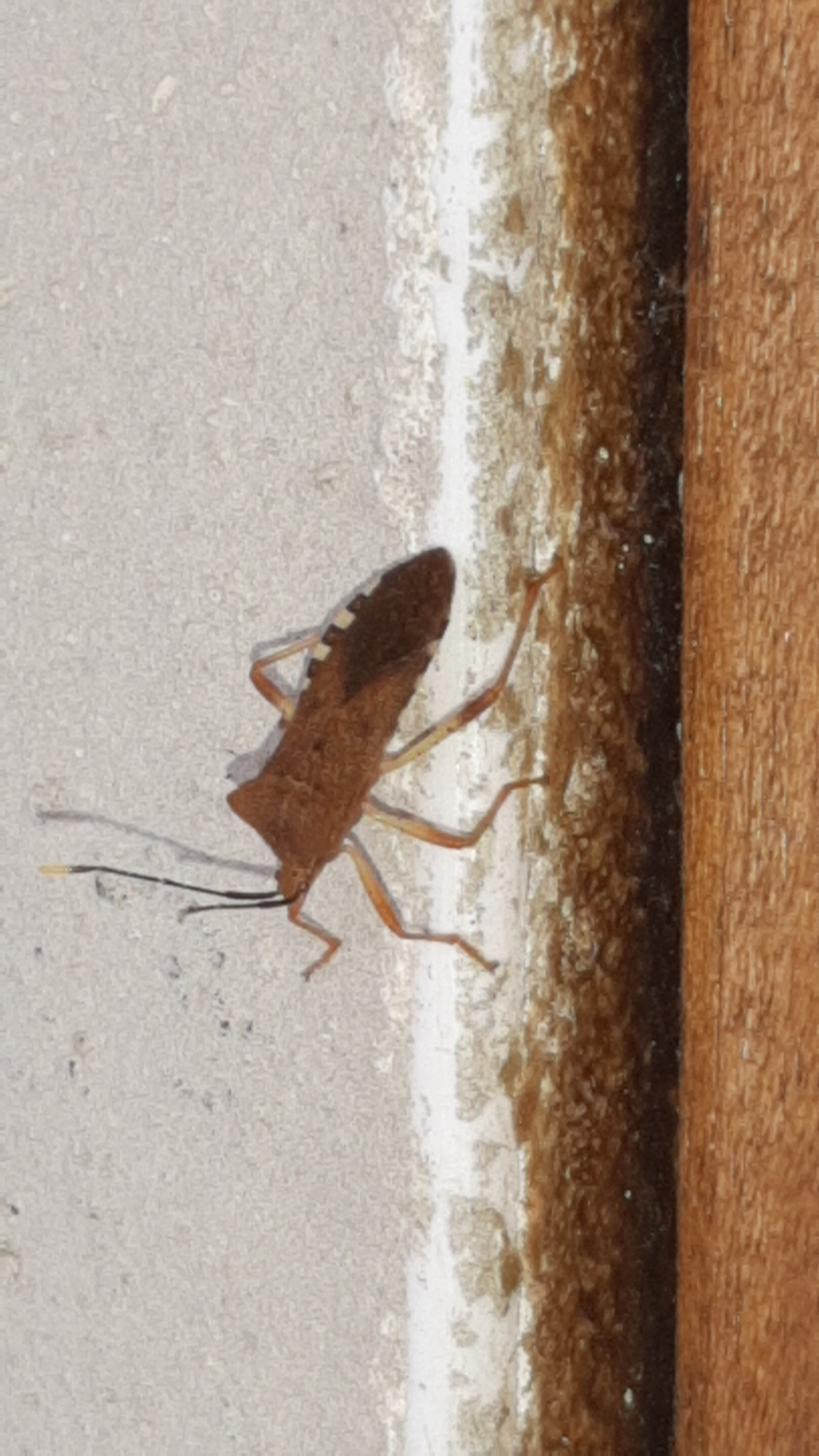
Anasa delibata, Costa Rica

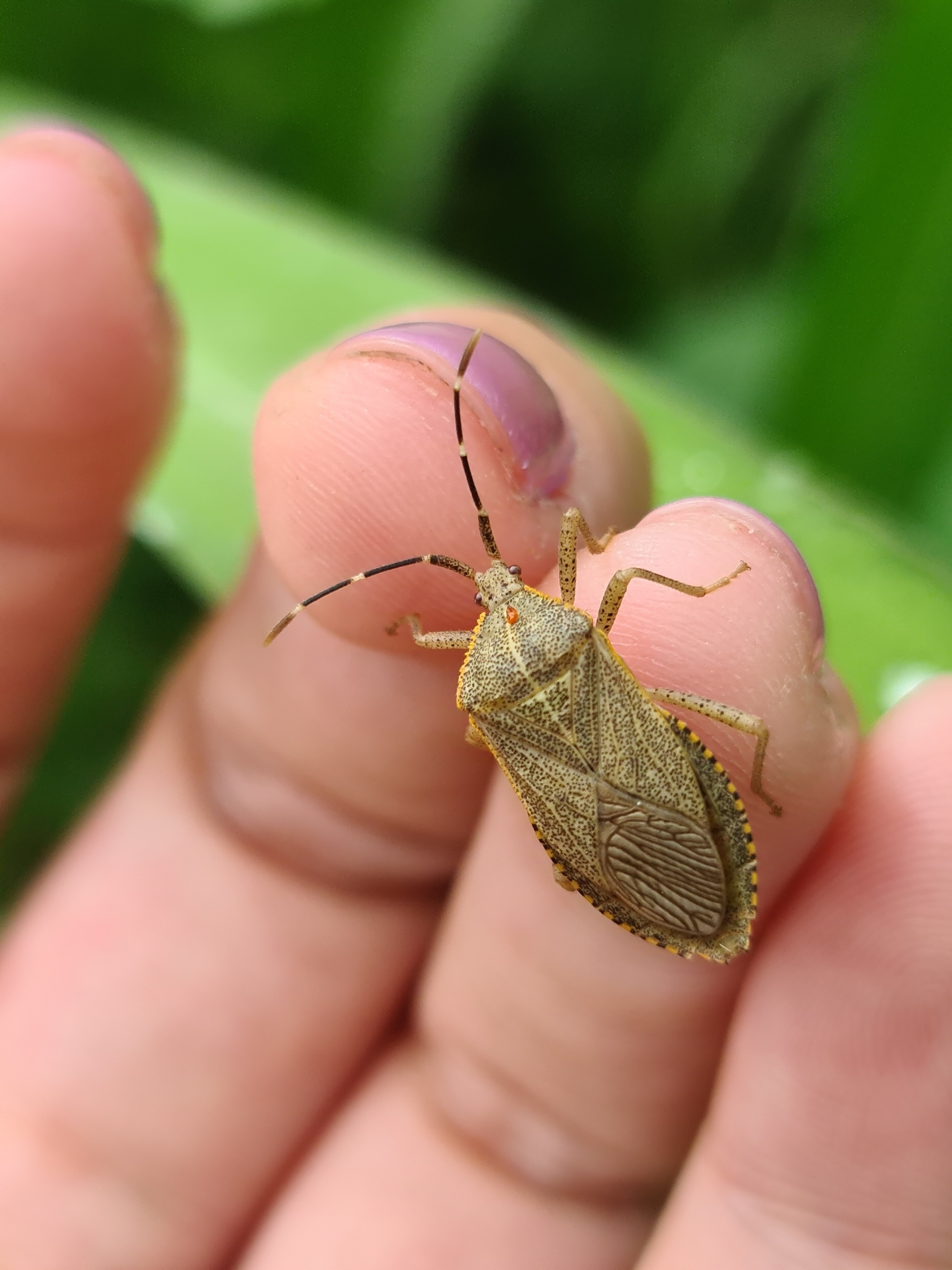
Anasa fuscopunctata, Argentina

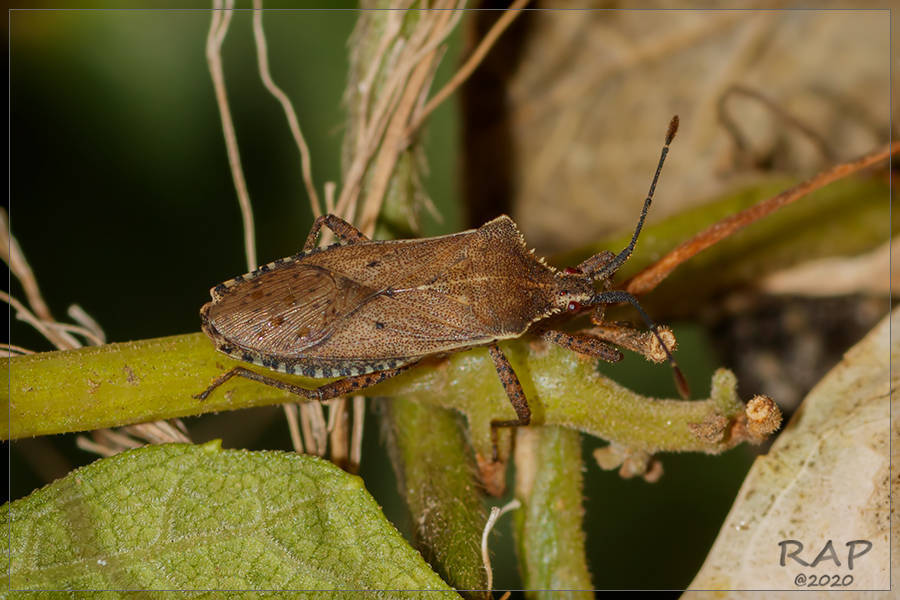
Anasa guttifera, Argentina

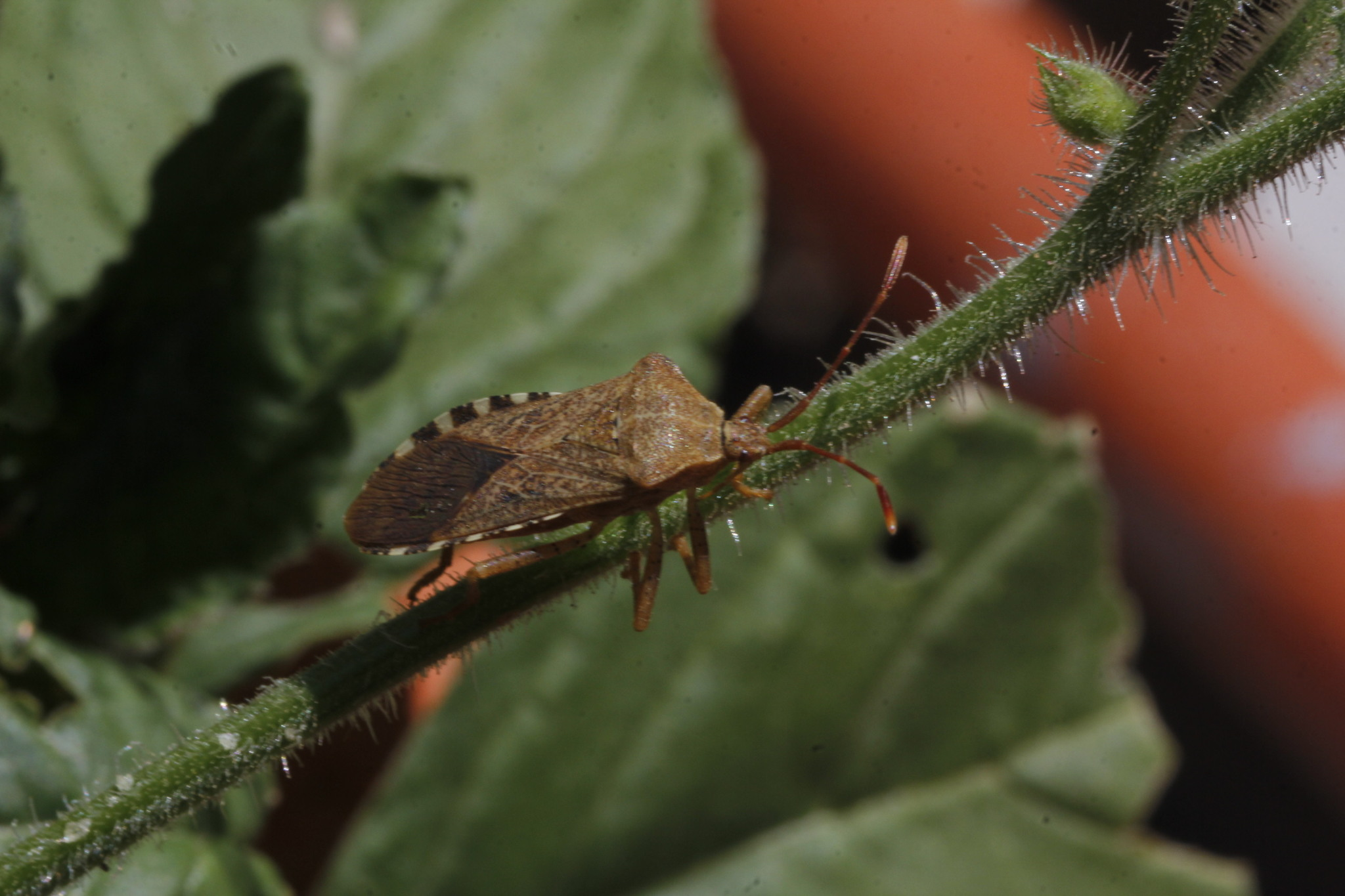
Anasa maculipes, México

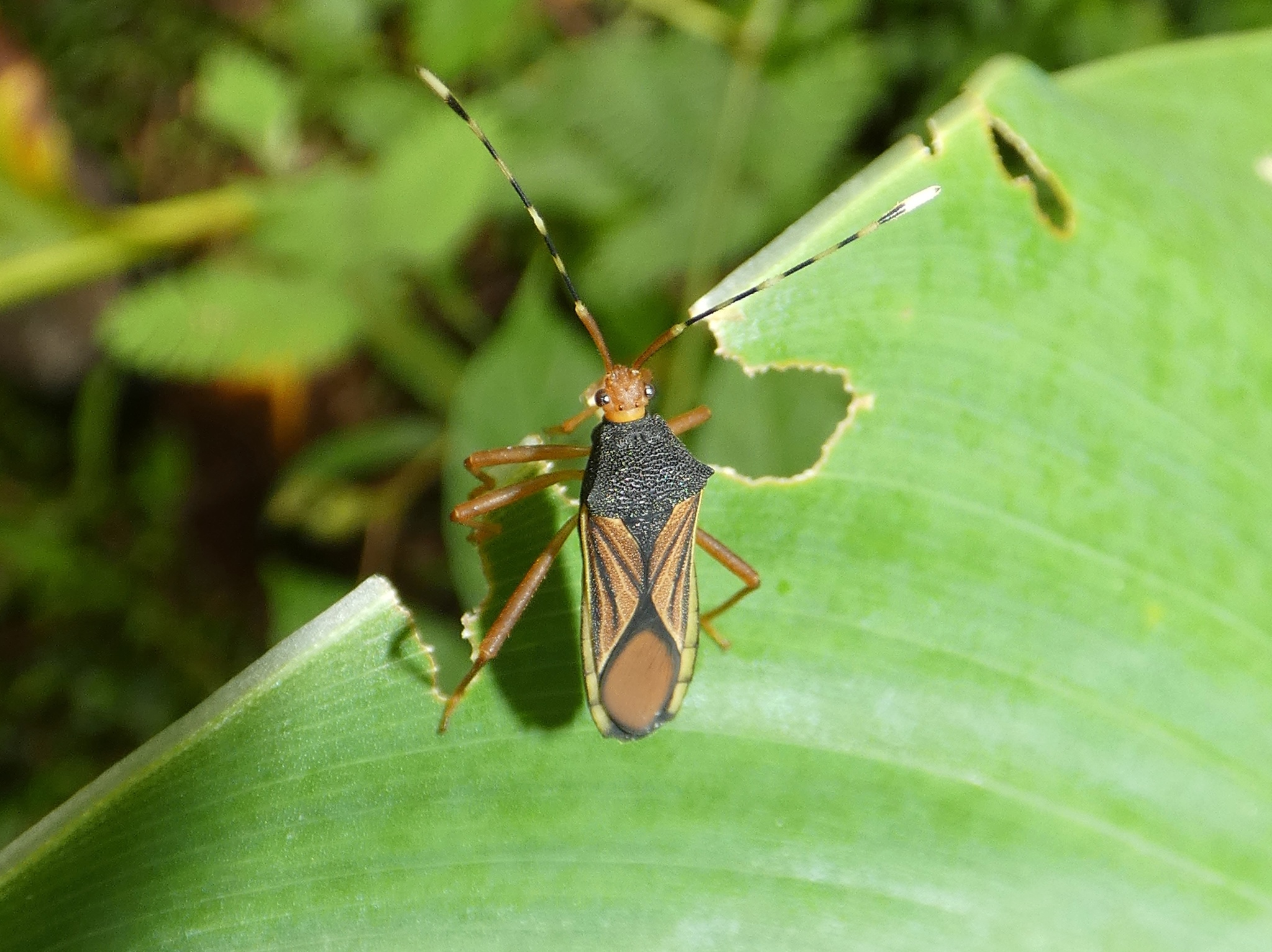
Anasa nigricollis, Panamá

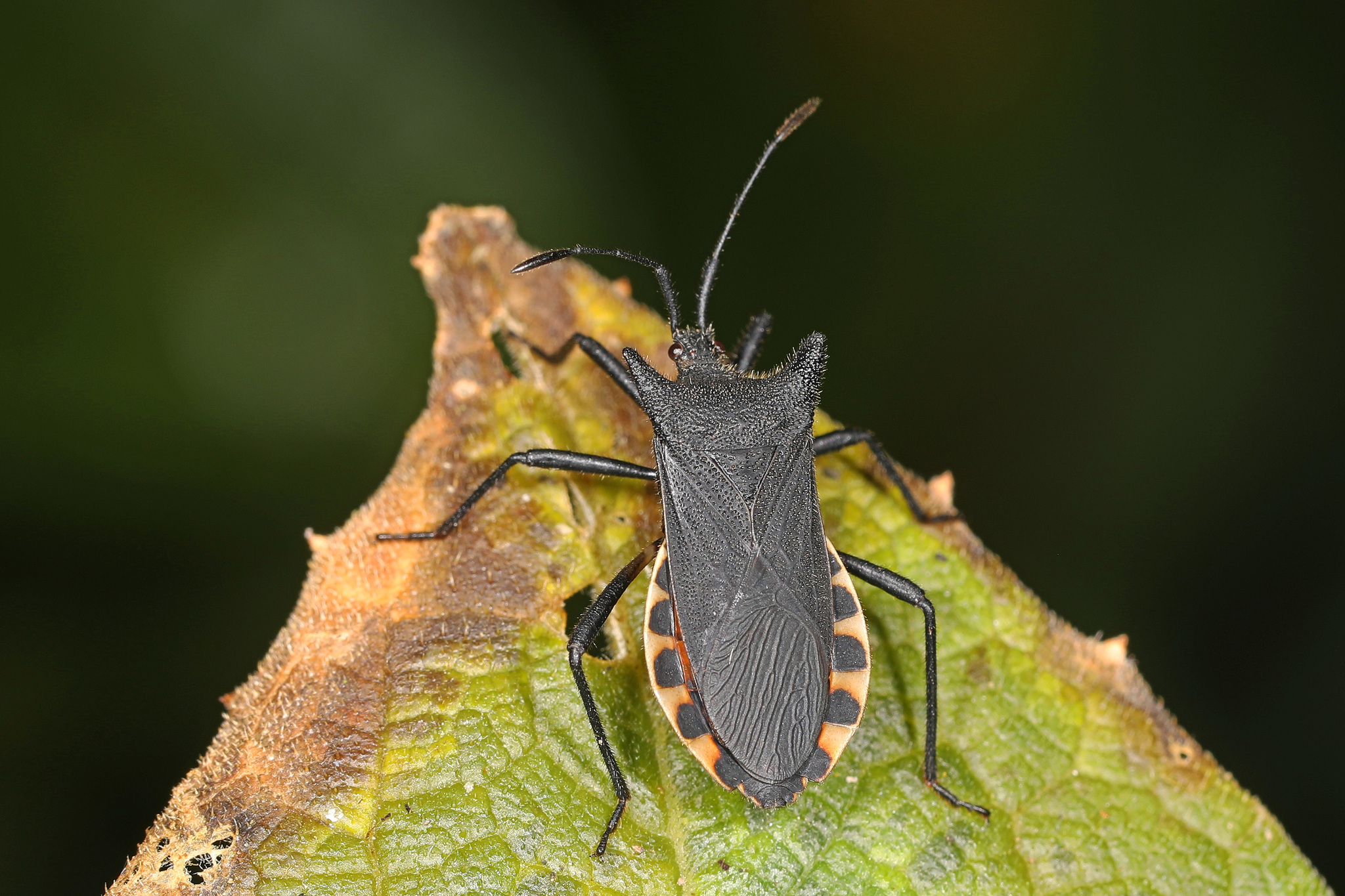
Anasa onorei, Ecuador

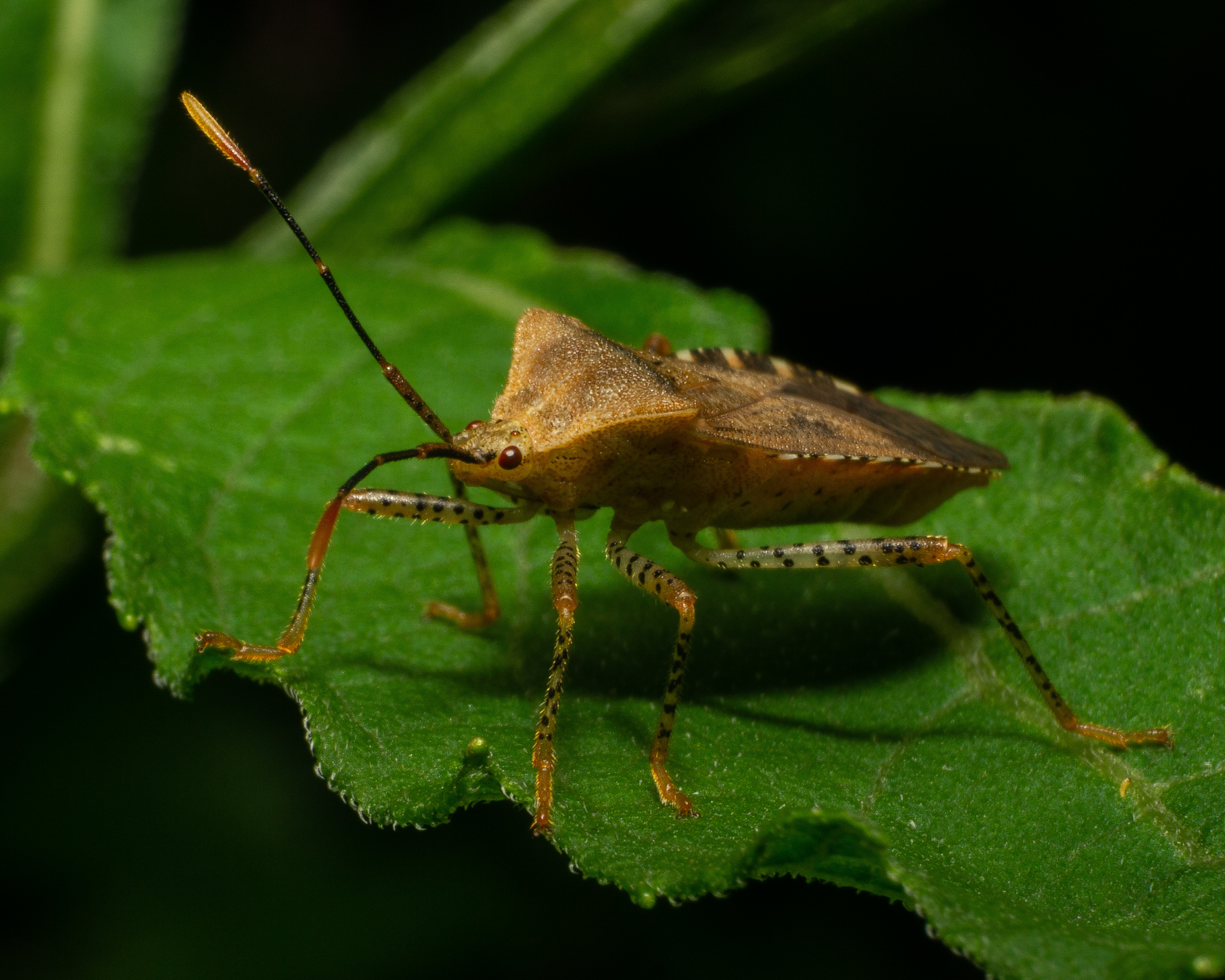
Anasa repetita, Pennsylvania

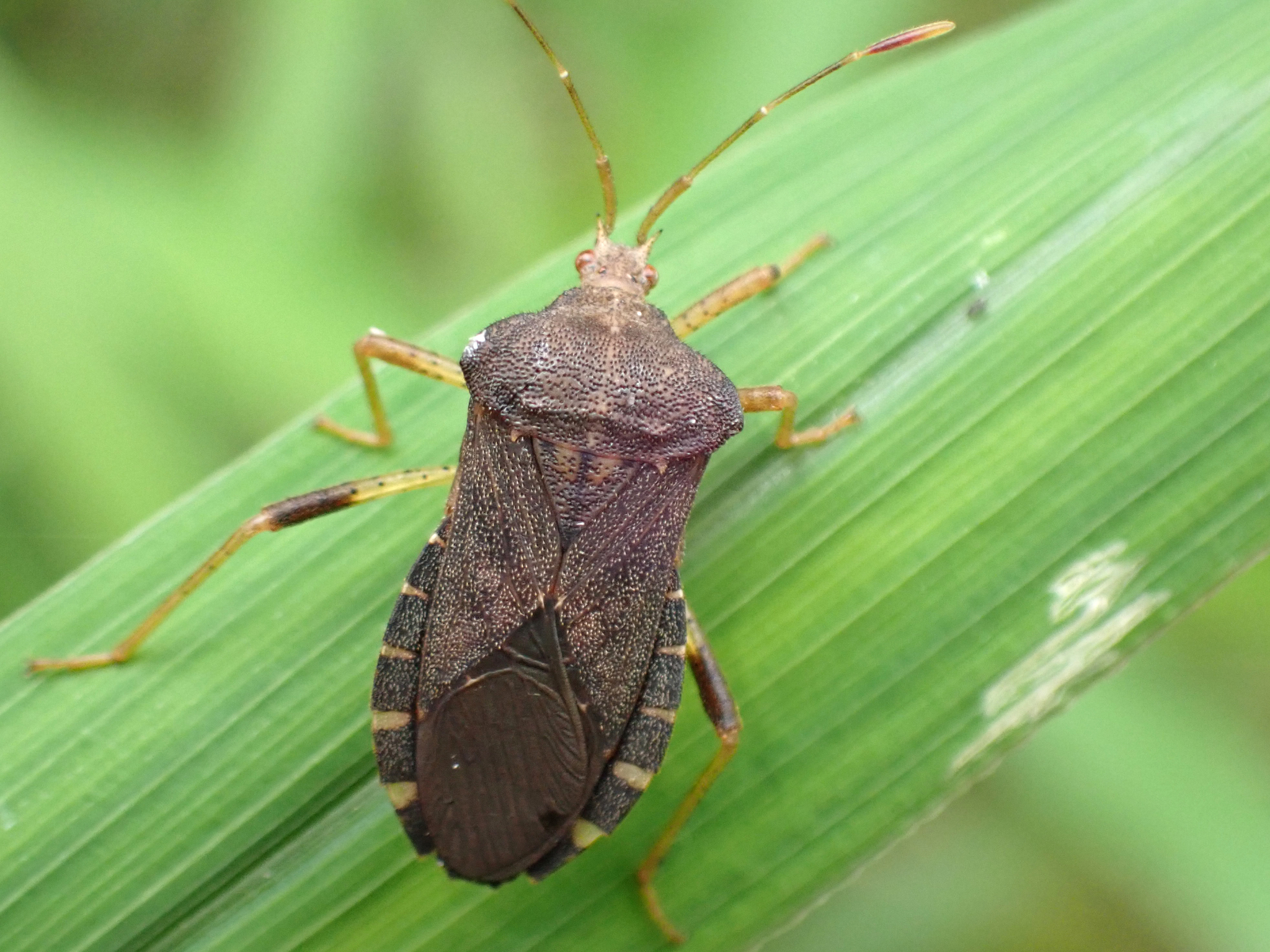
Anasa scorbutica, Florida

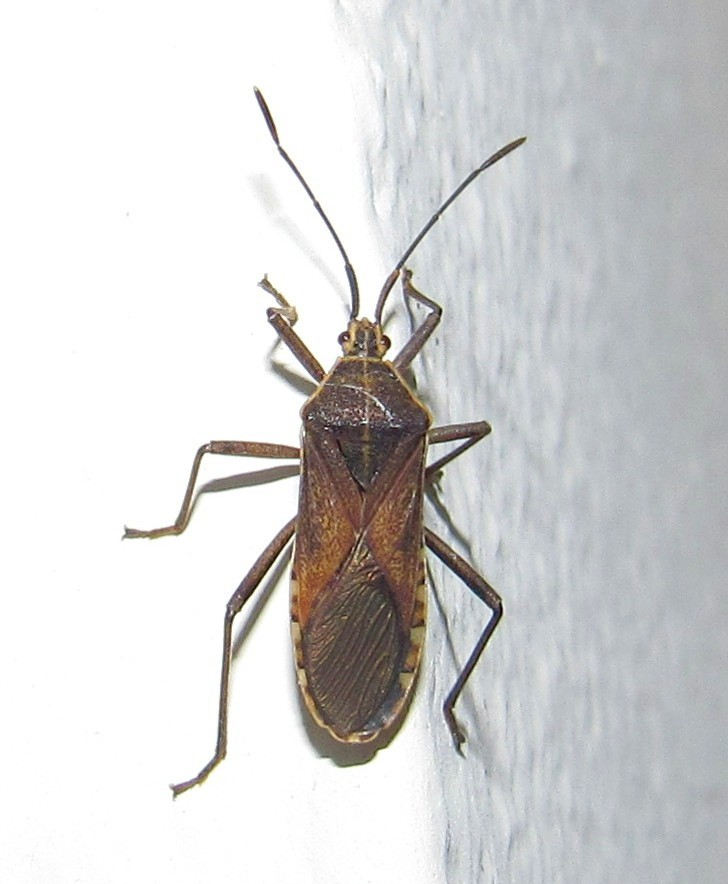
Anasa trilineata, Brasil

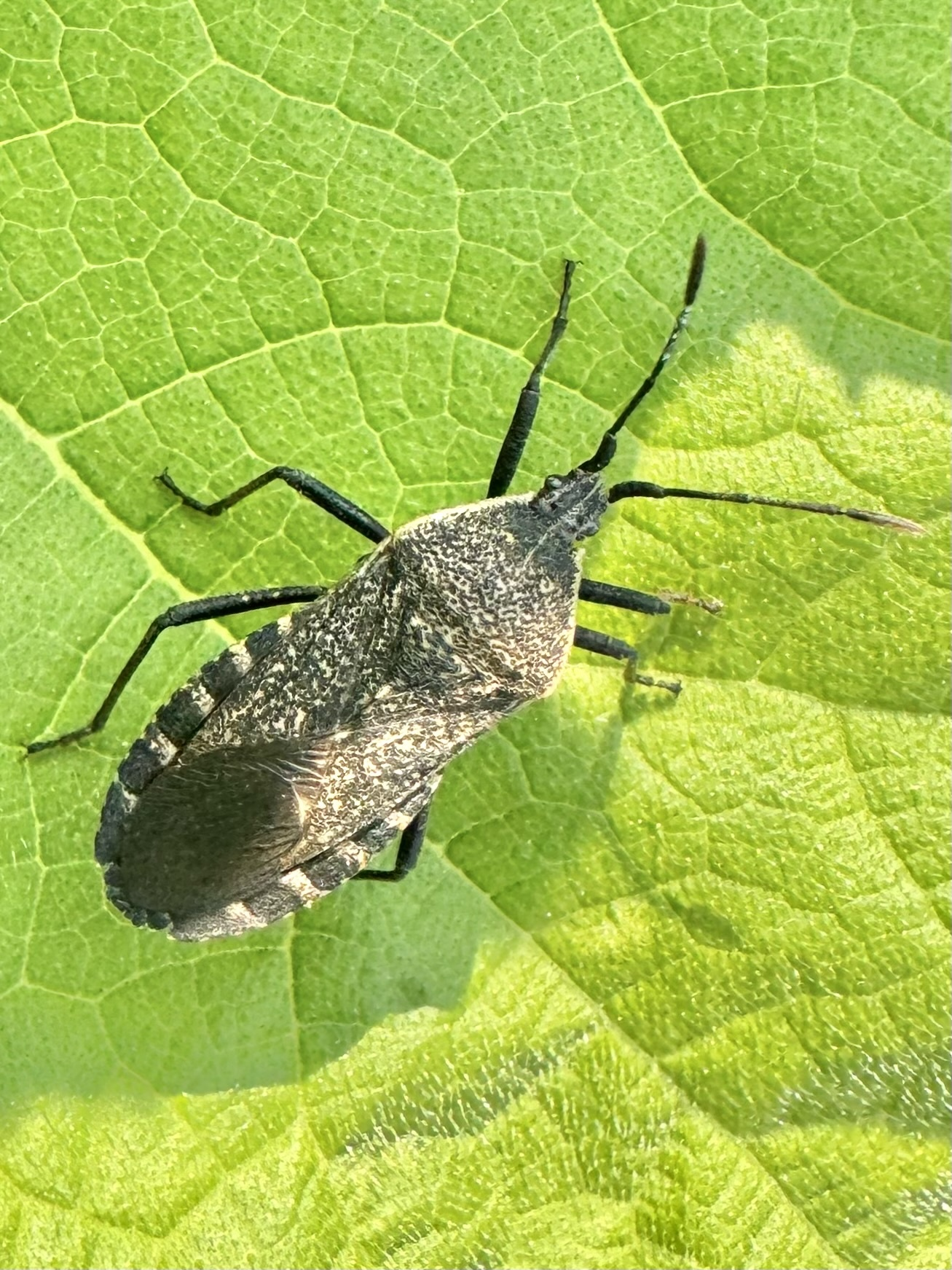
Anasa tristis, Illinois

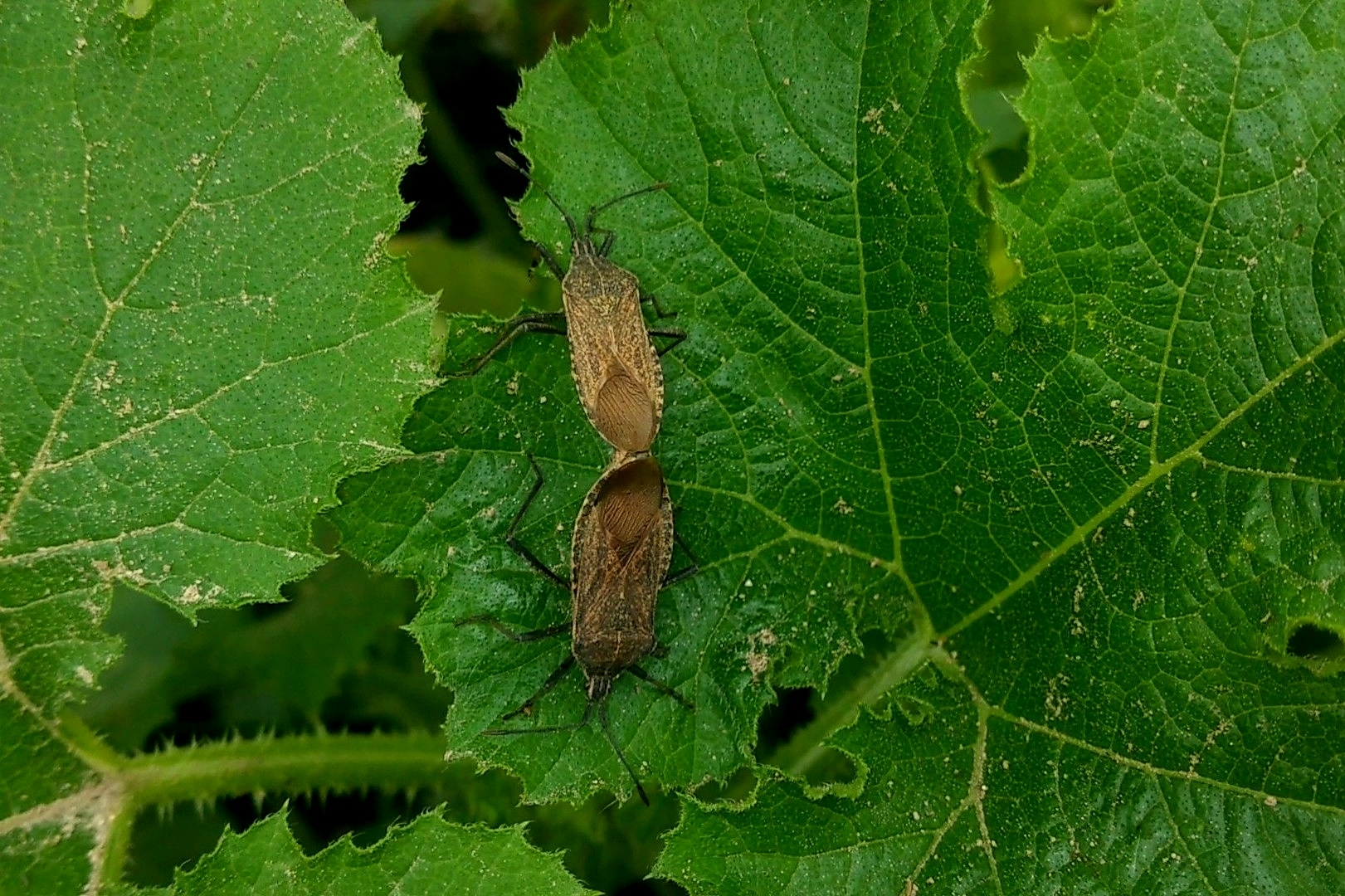
Anasa uhleri, México

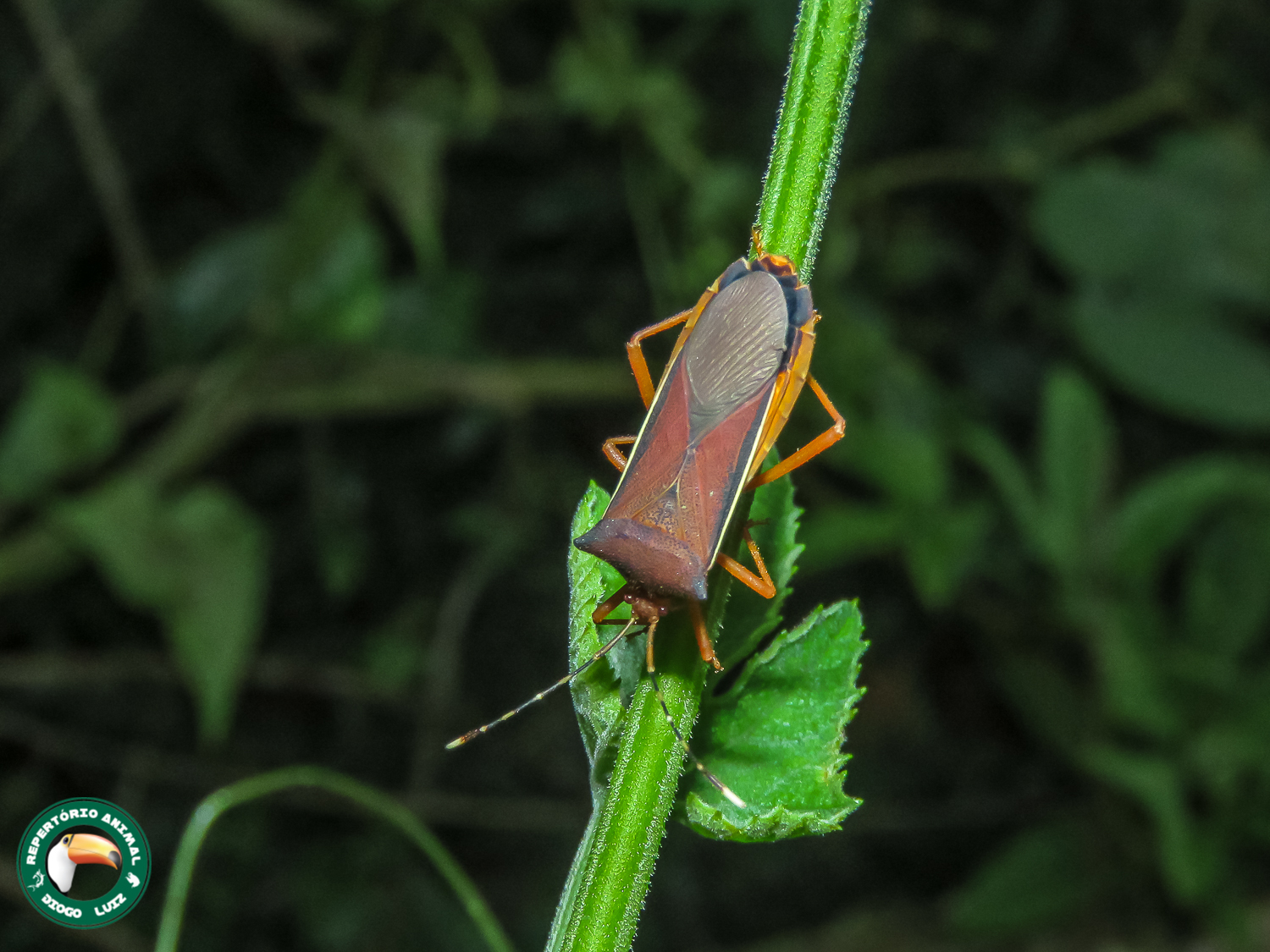
Anasa varicornis, Brasil
