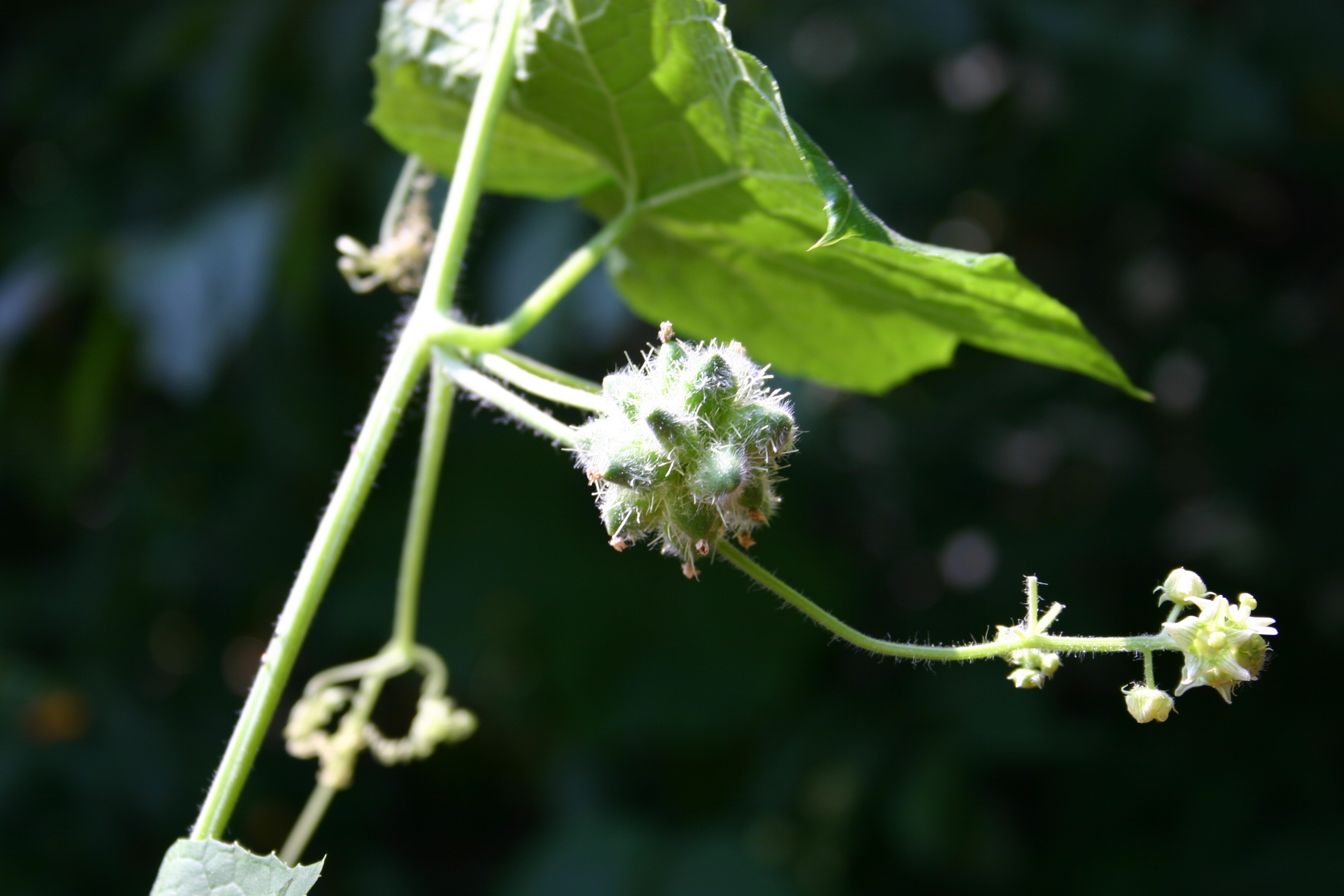
- Fruit and flowers

Scientific classification
- Kingdom: Plantae
- Clade: Tracheophytes
- Clade: Angiosperms
- Clade: Eudicots
- Clade: Rosids
- Order: Cucurbitales
- Family: Cucurbitaceae
- Genus: Sicyos
- Species: S. angulatus

Binomial name
- Sicyos angulatus L.

= Sicyos angulatus =

Species of flowering plant

Sicyos angulatus, the oneseed bur cucumber or star-cucumber is an annual vine in the gourd family, Cucurbitaceae, native to eastern North America. The plant forms mats or climbs using tendrils. The leaves are palmately veined and lobed, the flowers are green to yellowish green, and the fruits form clusters of very small pepos.

== Description ==
The vine produces long branching annual stems that climb over shrubs and fences or trail across the ground. The stems are hairy, pale green and furrowed. The alternate leaves have three to five palmate lobes and can be 8 in (20 cm) across. The margin is slightly toothed, the upper surface of the blade is usually hairless and the under side has fine hairs, especially on the veins. The petiole is thick and hairy, and about 5 in (13 cm) long. The leaf is deeply indented where it is attached to the petiole. Opposite some of the junctions formed by the petiole and stem, grow branched tendrils, and at others there are flower shoots. The plant is monoecious, with separate male and female blooms. The male flowers are in long-stemmed racemes. Each flower is about 0.3 in (0.8 cm) wide, with a calyx with five pointed teeth, a whitish, green-veined corolla with five lobes, and a central boss of stamens. The small female flowers are bunched together on a short stalk, each having its ovary enclosed in a spiny, hairy fruit; one seed is produced by each flower. The fruit, seen in small clusters, is about 0.5 in (1.3 cm) long, green at first but becomes brown with age; it is dispersed by animals which come into contact with its bristly surface.

== Distribution and habitat ==
S. angulatus is native to Ontario and Quebec in Canada, and the eastern and southern parts of the United States as far west as North Dakota and Texas. It grows in fertile, moist habitats such as floodplain areas, damp grassland, thickets, bushy places, river banks, ditches and field verges. It appreciates disturbed ground.

=== Invasive species ===
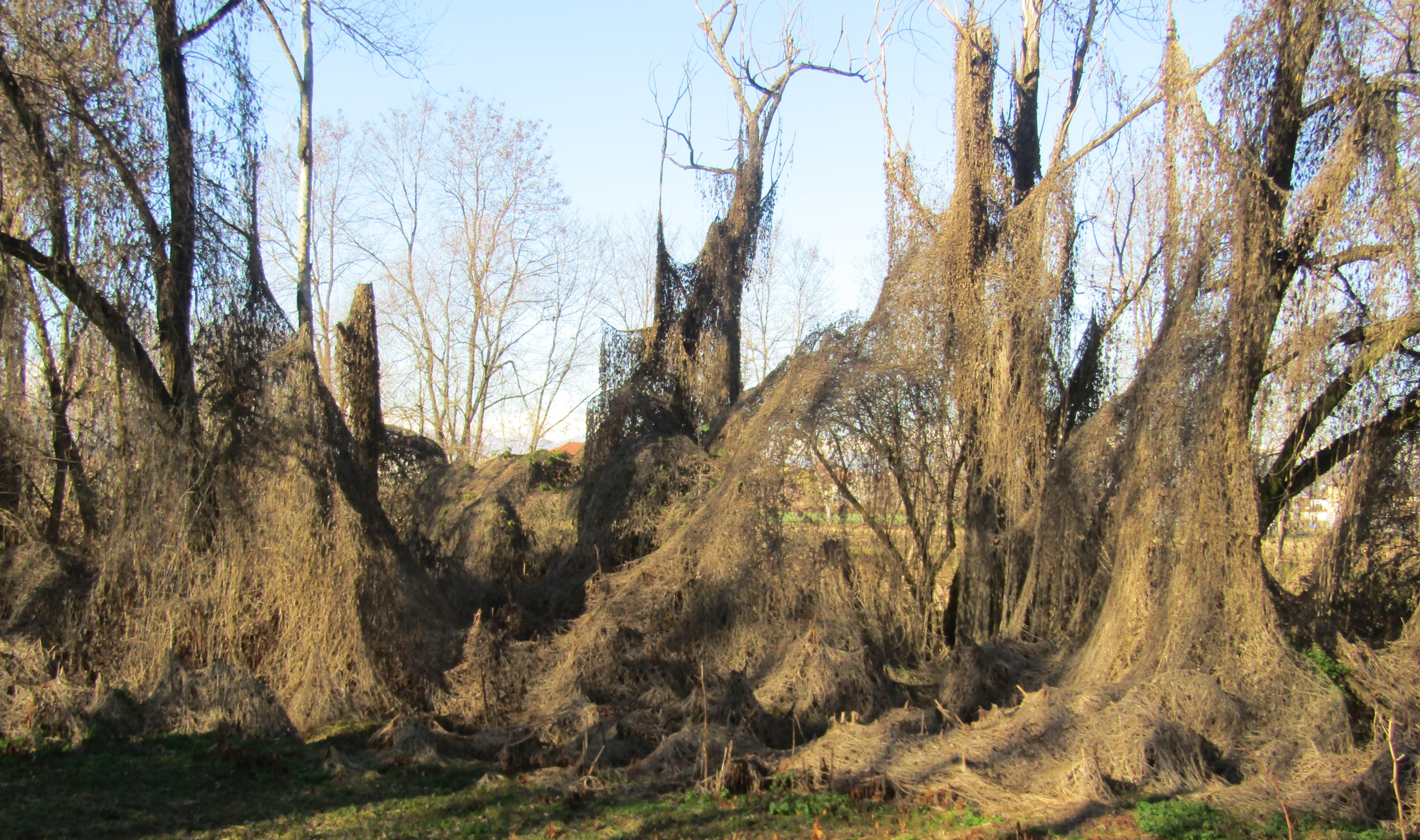
Infestation on the River Po banks

In Europe the oneseed bur cucumber was introduced as an ornamental plant during the 18th century; the first report of its naturalization in Germany dates back to 1835. In Italy, it was reported in Trentino since 1853. Nowadays Sicyos angulatus is considered an invasive species, quite difficult to control because its seed bank can last in the ground for at least three years after the destruction of the aerial part of the plant. Its infestation can be impressive, covering the pre-existing vegetation with thick and heavy mats. The species tend to spread along river banks, where it finds the better ecological conditions for its growth, but recently it can also be found alongside road and field edges.

== Ecology ==
Bumblebees and honey bees, as well as various flies, sphecid wasps and vespid wasps are attracted to the nectar produced by the flowers. Some bees also collect pollen from the male flowers. Anasa armigera (horned squash bug) and A. repetita feed on the plant, as do the spotted cucumber beetle, the striped cucumber beetle and the leaf beetle Acalymma gouldi. Herbivorous mammals seem to avoid the plant.

== Uses ==
The foliage of Sicyos angulatus can be cooked and eaten as a green vegetable. A decoction of the plant is reputed to be used in traditional Native American medicine to treat venereal disease.

== Gallery ==
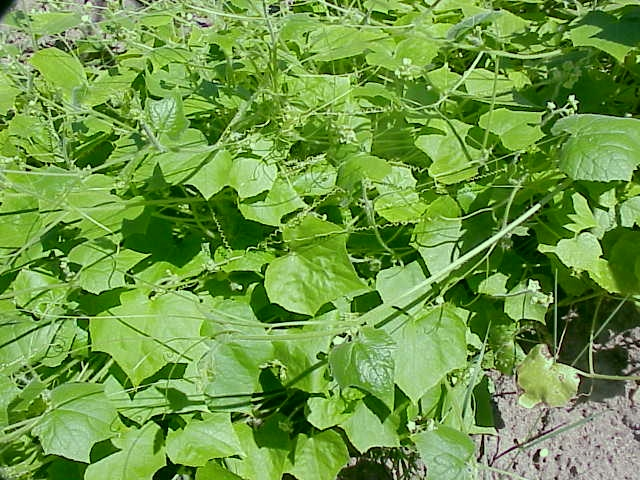
Leaves and tendrils

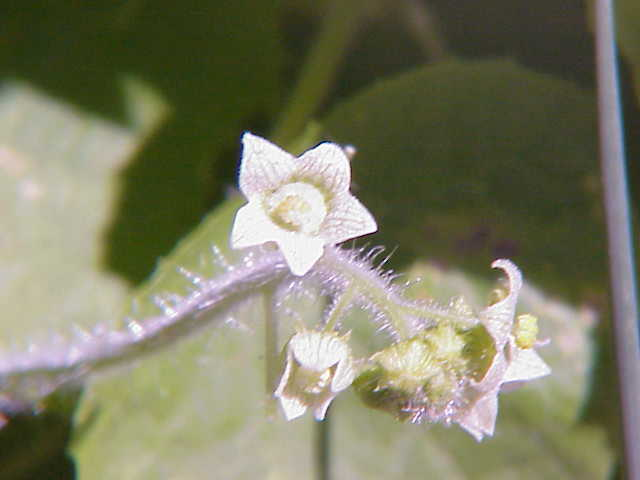
Male flower

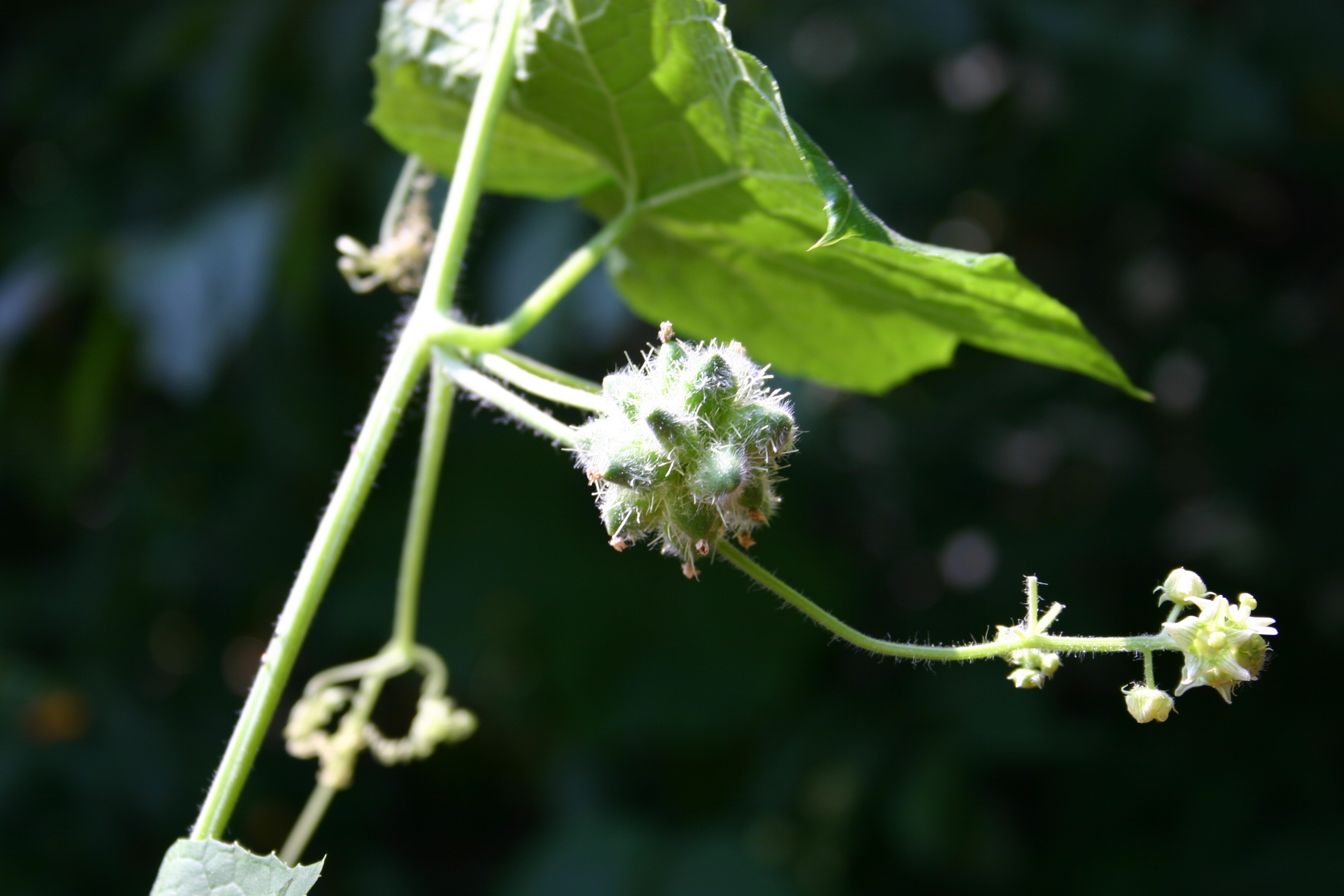
Fruit cluster

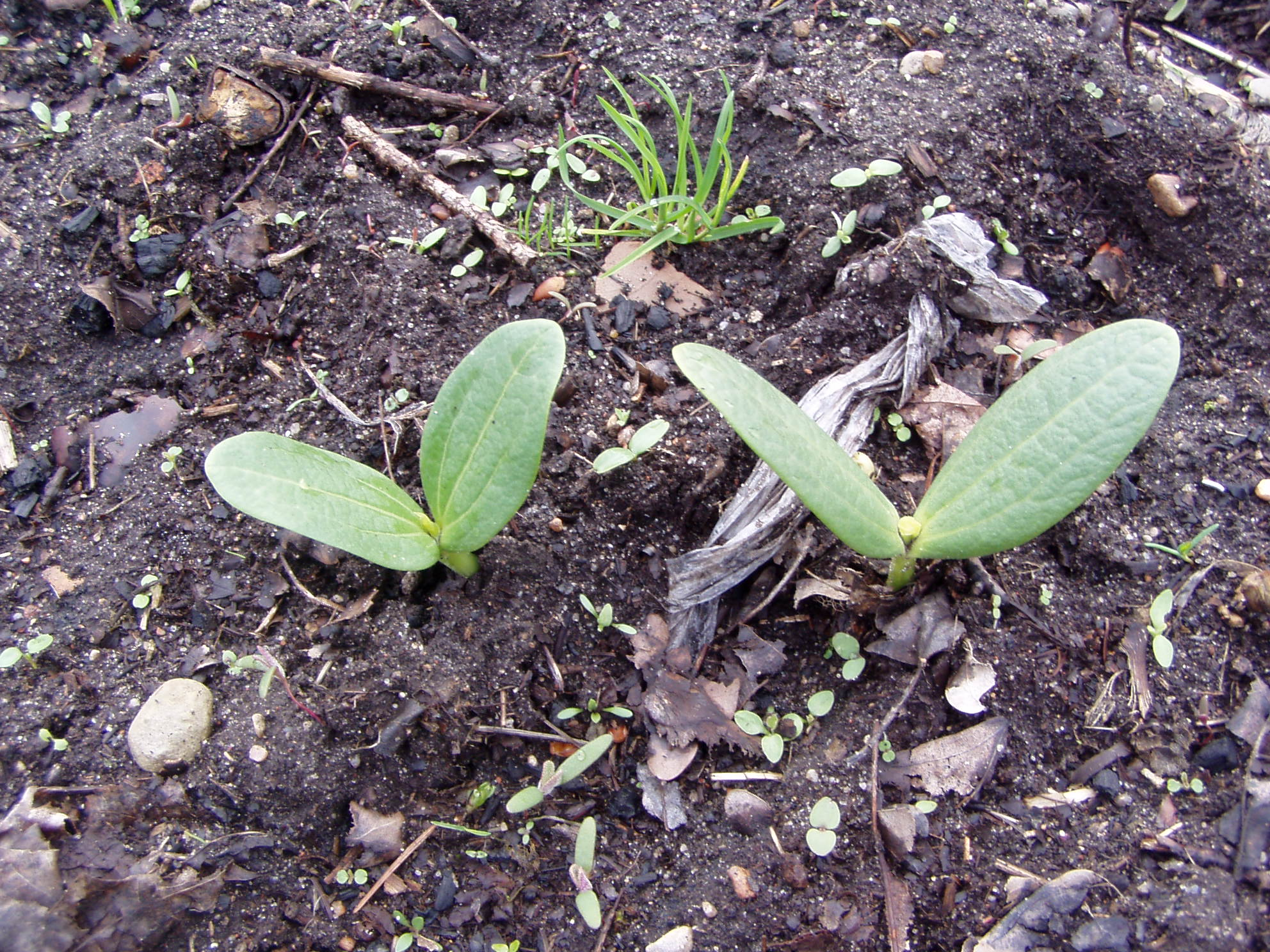
Seedlings
