= Squash bug =

Squash bug is a common name for several insects in the family Coreidae and may refer to:

- Acanthocoris scabrator
- Anasa tristis, native to North America
- Euthochtha galeator, common throughout the eastern United States
