= Helen Ashurst Choate =

American botanist

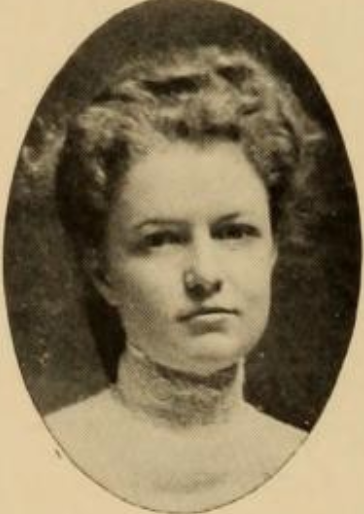
- Helen Ashurst Choate, from the 1904 yearbook of Smith College
- Born: August 29, 1882; Irvington, New York, U.S.
- Died: December 12, 1957 (aged 75); Northampton, Massachusetts, U.S.
- Other name: Helen Ashhurst Choate
- Occupations: Botanist, plant physiologist, college professor
- Relatives: James Morris Whiton (uncle)

Helen Ashurst Choate (August 29, 1882 – December 12, 1957) was an American plant physiologist and historian of science who taught botany at Smith College from 1909 to 1947. (Her middle name is spelled "Ashhurst" in many records, but Smith College Archives uses the one-h spelling.)

== Early life and education ==
Choate was born in Irvington, New York, the daughter of Washington Choate and Grace Richards Whiton Choate. Her father was an ordained Presbyterian minister. Linguist and educator James Morris Whiton was her uncle.

She graduated from Smith College in 1904, and earned a master's degree there in 1909, working with William Francis Ganong. She completed a Ph.D. from the University of Chicago in 1920, with a dissertation titled "Chemical Changes in Wheat During Germination" (1921). She was a member of Phi Beta Kappa.

== Career ==
Choate taught at Greenwich Academy after college. She taught botany at Smith College from 1909 until she retired in 1947, and was department head for several years. She was a member of Sigma Xi, Sigma Delta Epsilon, The American Association for the Advancement of Science, the History of Science Society, and the Botanical Society of America.

== Publications ==
Choate's work was published in scholarly journals including The Plant World, School Science and Mathematics, Torreya, Botanical Gazette, American Journal of Botany, and Science.

- "The Origin and Development of the Binomial System of Nomenclature" (1912)
- "A Standardization of Floral Diagrams for Educational Use" (1914)
- "An Unpublished Letter by Gronovius" (1916)
- "The Earliest Glossary of Botanical Terms: Fuchs 1542" (1917)
- "Chemical Changes in Wheat During Germination" (1921)
- "Dormancy and Germination in Seeds of Echinocystis lobata" (1940)
- "William Francis Ganong " (1941, with Frances Grace Smith)

== Personal life ==
Choate lived with her older sister Miriam Choate Hobart in their later years. Choate died in 1957, at the age of 75, at a hospital in Northampton, Massachusetts. Smith College Archives holds a box of her papers.
