= Anasa andresii =

Scientific classification
- Kingdom: Animalia
- Phylum: Arthropoda
- Clade: Pancrustacea
- Class: Insecta
- Order: Hemiptera
- Suborder: Heteroptera
- Family: Coreidae
- Tribe: Coreini
- Genus: Anasa
- Species: A. andresii

Binomial name
- Anasa andresii (Guérin-Méneville, 1857)

Species of true bug

Anasa andresii is a species of leaf-footed bug in the family Coreidae. It is found in the Caribbean Sea, Central America, North America, and South America.
