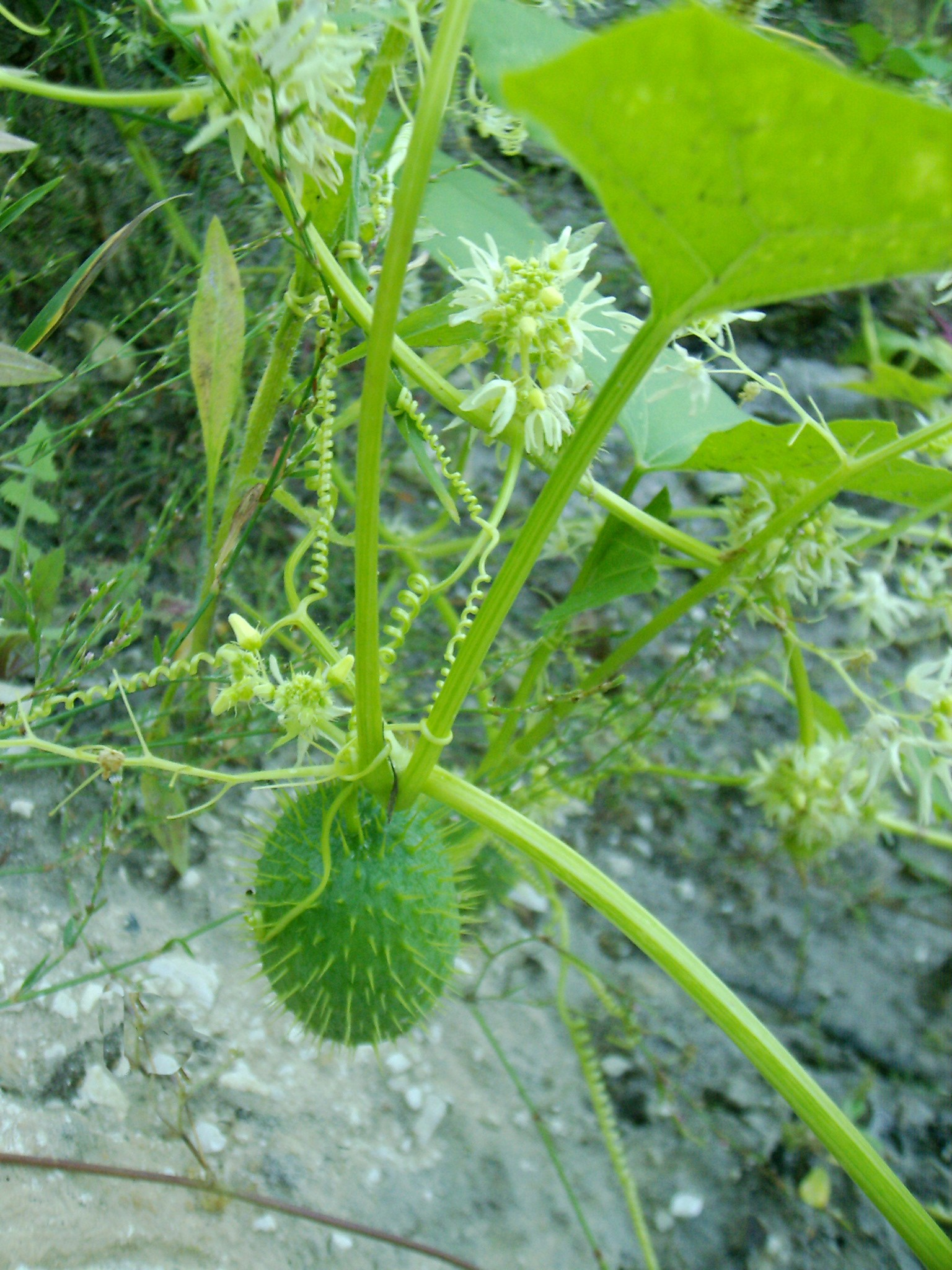

Conservation status
- Secure (NatureServe)

Scientific classification
- Kingdom: Plantae
- Clade: Embryophytes
- Clade: Tracheophytes
- Clade: Spermatophytes
- Clade: Angiosperms
- Clade: Eudicots
- Clade: Rosids
- Order: Cucurbitales
- Family: Cucurbitaceae
- Subfamily: Cucurbitoideae
- Tribe: Sicyoeae
- Genus: Echinocystis; Torr. & A.Gray
- Species: E. lobata

Binomial name
- Echinocystis lobata (Michx.) Torr. & A. Gray

= Echinocystis =

Genus of flowering plants

Echinocystis is a monotypic genus in the gourd family, Cucurbitaceae. The sole species is E. lobata, commonly called wild cucumber and prickly cucumber. It is an annual, sprawling plant that is native to North America. Sicyos angulatus, common name "bur cucumber", is an annual plant with a similar clinging vine growth but different-appearing flowers and seed pods.

== Description ==
Echinocystis lobata is an annual vine that produces stems that can be as long as 8 m (26 ft) and which climb, with the help of coiling, branched tendrils, over shrubs and fences or trail across the ground. The stems are angular and furrowed. The leaves are alternate with long petioles, five palmate lobes and no stipules. The plants are monoecious, with separate male and female blooms on the same plant. The male flowers are in long-stemmed, upright panicles. Each flower has a white, or greenish-yellow, corolla with six slender lobes. The male flower has a single central stamen with a yellow anther. The female flower has a single stigma and is borne on a short stalk at the base of the flower panicle, with the spiky globular inferior ovary being immediately beneath. The fruit is a prickly, inflated capsule up to 5 cm (2 in) long with two pores and four seeds. It resembles a tiny spiny water melon, or cucumber, but is inedible. It persists all winter and then opens at the bottom, liberating the seeds.

This species can be distinguished from the oneseed bur cucumber (Sicyos angulatus) by the six-lobed corolla and the lack of the clustered fruits that that plant bears. It also appears similar to Marah macrocarpa (also known as wild cucumber), a large-rooted perennial plant which has a six-lobed corolla as well and is found in Southern California chaparral where E. lobata is not.

== Distribution ==
The native range across North America includes forty U.S. states (excluding Nevada, Hawaii, Alaska, and most of the far Southeastern states); and nine Canadian provinces. It has also been reported as an uncommon invasive species in the Örség Landscape Protection Area of Hungary near the Austrian-Slovenian border. Similarly it is reported as an adventive alien species that grew in wetland, grassland and human-affected areas of the Carei Plain natural protected area, western Romania.

== Insect interactions ==
This vine has been reported as a food source and host plant for the leaf-footed bug Anasa repetita, which feeds along the entire length of the stem and at the developing roots. Specimens collected in September 2006 from a E. lobata in Grant County, Wisconsin were the first recording of the bug in that state. Additionally, the pentatomid species Euschistus servus euschistoides is recorded as feeding on developing E. lobata fruit. Robertson in 1928 reported that 2 different species of parasitoid hymenopterans had been collected from E. lobata flowers in central Illinois. Both the scoliid wasp Scolia bicincta and the tiphiid wasp Myzinum quinquecinctum nectared on the flowers, along with a number of other flower species. The beetle species Chauliognathus pensylvanicus is listed as visiting the wild flowers growing in Wisconsin.

== Bacterial infection ==
E. lobata has been shown to be susceptible to bacterial wilt, a disease caused by infection of the plants with the bacterium Erwinia tracheiphila. Bacteria are transmitted between plants by the Striped cucumber beetle Acalymma vittatum. As the adult beetles feed they also drop frass on fresh areas of feeding which results in infection of the plant. The susceptibility of E. lobata, Cucurbita foetidissima, Cucurbita californica and Sicyos angulatus to bacterial wilt was identified via experiments by E. M. Smith in 1911.

== Uses ==
The plant has been used medicinally by native Americans. The Taos Pueblo of New Mexico used it to treat rheumatism, while the Menominee of Wisconsin made a bitter extract from the roots for use as a love potion and as an analgesic. The powdered root has been used to prepare a poultice to relieve headaches and the seeds have been used as beads.
