= Yale First Nation =

First Nation government in British Columbia, Canada

Yale First Nation (Halkomelem: X̱wóx̱welá꞉lhp) is a First Nations government located at Yale, British Columbia. Yale has 16 distinct reserves stretching from near Sawmill Creek to American Creek, with the most southern reserve situated at Ruby Creek in the District of Kent.

== Indian reserves ==
Indian reserves under the administration of the Yale First Nation are:

- 4 1/2 Mile Indian Reserve No. 2, on the right bank of the Fraser River 3 miles northeast of Yale, 4.30 ha. 49°36′00″N 121°25′00″W
- Albert Flat Indian Reserve No. 5, on the right bank of the Fraser River, 3 miles south of Yale, 52.30 ha. 49°31′00″N 121°25′00″W
- Kaykaip Indian Reserve No. 7, on the left bank of the Fraser River at the mouth of Keikum Creek, 10.0 ha. 49°29′00″N 121°25′00″W
- Lukseetsissum Indian Reserve No. 9, on the right bank of the Fraser River at Ruby Creek CPR station, 53.90 ha. 49°21′00″N 121°37′00″W
- Qualark Indian Reserve No. 4, on the left bank of the Fraser River at the mouth of Qualark Creek, 10.0 ha. 49°32′00″N 121°25′00″W
- Squeah Indian Reserve No. 6, on the left bank of the Fraser River, at the mouth of Suka Creek, 16.80 ha. 49°30′00″N 121°25′00″W
- Stullawheets Indian Reserve No. 8, on the right bank of the Fraser River, at Choate CPR station, 52.60 ha. 49°28′00″N 121°25′00″W
- Yale Indian Reserve No. 18, an island in the Fraser River offshore from Kuthlalth Indian Reserve No. 3, 1.5 miles east of Yale, 0.70 ha. 49°34′00″N 121°24′00″W
- Yale Indian Reserve No. 19, on the left bank of the Fraser River, north of and adjoining Kuthlalth IR No. 3, 0.70 ha. 49°34′00″N 121°24′00″W
- Yale Indian Reserve No. 20 on the left bank of the Fraser River, at the mouth of a creek 2 miles above Yale, 5.60 ha. 49°34′00″N 121°24′00″W
- Yale Indian Reserve No. 21, on the left bank of the Fraser River, north of Siwash Creek, 1.30 ha. 49°35′00″N 121°24′00″W
- Yale Indian Reserve No. 22, on the right bank of the Fraser River, 3 miles north of Yale, including a Graveyard and rocks claimed by Billy Swallsea, 3.40 ha. 49°35′00″N 121°24′00″W
- Yale Indian Reserve No. 23, on the right bank of the Fraser River, 3 miles north of Yale, 5.60 ha. 49°36′00″N 121°25′00″W
- Yale Indian Reserve No. 24, on the right bank of the Fraser River, 3 miles north of Yale, 0.20 ha. 49°36′00″N 121°25′00″W
- Yale Indian Reserve No. 25, on the left bank of the Fraser River, 3 miles north of Yale, 0.30 ha. 49°36′00″N 121°25′00″W
- Yale Town Indian Reserve No. 1, 6.40 ha. 49°34′00″N 121°26′00″W

== Treaty Process ==
Yale has reached Stage 6 in the BC Treaty Process, but the current Chief and Council recently announced that they have halted implementation of their final agreement that was negotiated by former leadership, and do not intend to bring the agreement into full force and effect. Compared to other modern treaty agreements, the land offer was 1.92% of their traditional land base by area, much lower than the 5% benchmark set by other agreements. In addition to the land concerns, there were many other factors that have stirred much controversy over the ability of the final agreement to achieve the desired objectives. For example, the agreement references the Puchil dialect of the Nlaka'pamux Nation, but many members of the community speak Halq'emeylem which is a Coast Salish language.

== Chief and Council ==
Chief: Troy Peters

Council: Judith Moreno

Council: Janita Peters

Green House Manager: Sarah Bélair

Housing Manager: Katherine Giroux

Social Development: Paul Keller

Fisheries: Dominic Hope

Finance: Cathy Speth

Nurse: Maggi-lyn Peters

== Demographics ==
Number of Band Members: 177

On reserve: 60

Off reserve: 117

Members aged 16 and older (age required to vote): 125.
