= Joe Benning =

American politician

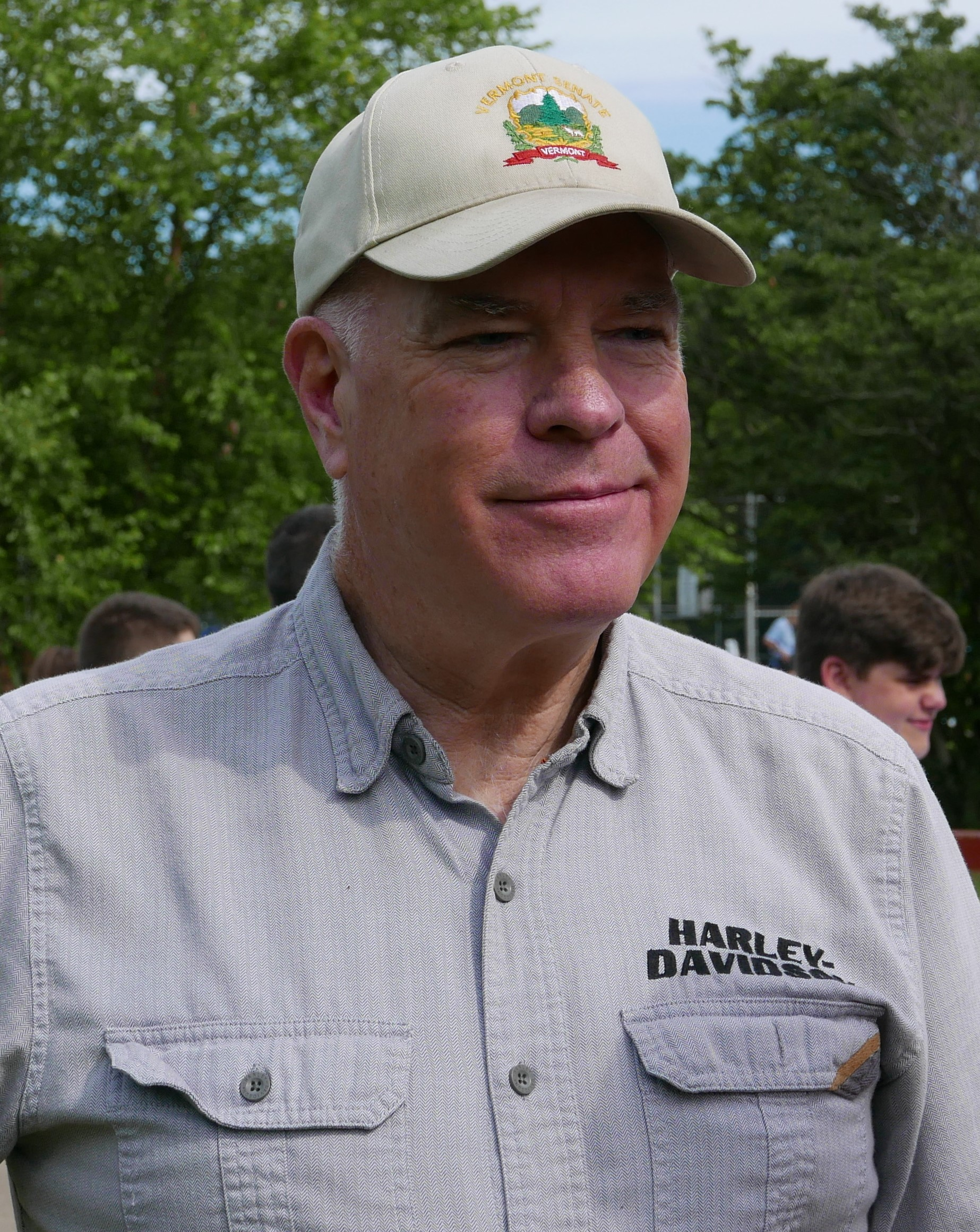

Minority Leader of the Vermont Senate
- In office January 4, 2018 – January 6, 2021
- Preceded by: Dustin Degree
- Succeeded by: Randy Brock
- In office January 2013 – January 2017
- Preceded by: Bill Doyle
- Succeeded by: Dustin Degree

Member of the Vermont Senate from the Caledonia district
- In office January 2011 – January 4, 2023
- Preceded by: Matthew Choate
- Succeeded by: Seat abolished

Personal details
- Born: Joseph Charles Benning; December 7, 1956 (age 69) Long Branch, New Jersey, U.S.
- Party: Republican
- Spouse: Debbie
- Children: 2
- Education: Lyndon State College (BA); Vermont Law School (JD)
- Website: www.joebenning.com

Joseph Charles Benning (born December 7, 1956) is an American politician and a Republican who served as a member of the Vermont Senate representing Caledonia District from 2011 to 2023. He served as the Senate's Minority leader from January 2013 to January 2017, when he was succeeded by Dustin Allard Degree. In late 2017, Degree resigned from the Senate, and Benning was again chosen by the Senate's Republicans to serve as Minority Leader.

Born in Long Branch, New Jersey, Benning graduated from Mater Dei High School in 1975. He earned a B.A. in Social Science from Lyndon State College in 1979 and a J.D. from the Vermont Law School in 1983.

Benning is former Chair of Vermont's Human Rights Commission and former member of the Board of Trustees for the Vermont State Colleges. He was elected to the Vermont Senate in 2010.

Vermont Senate
| Preceded by Matthew Choate | Member of the Vermont Senate from the Caledonia district 2011–2023 | Succeeded by Seat abolished |
| Preceded by Bill Doyle | Minority Leader of the Vermont Senate; 2013–2017 | Succeeded by Dustin Degree |
| Preceded by Dustin Degree | Minority Leader of the Vermont Senate; 2018–2021 | Succeeded by Randy Brock |
Party political offices
| Preceded by Scott Milne | Republican nominee for Lieutenant Governor of Vermont; 2022 | Succeeded by John S. Rodgers |
