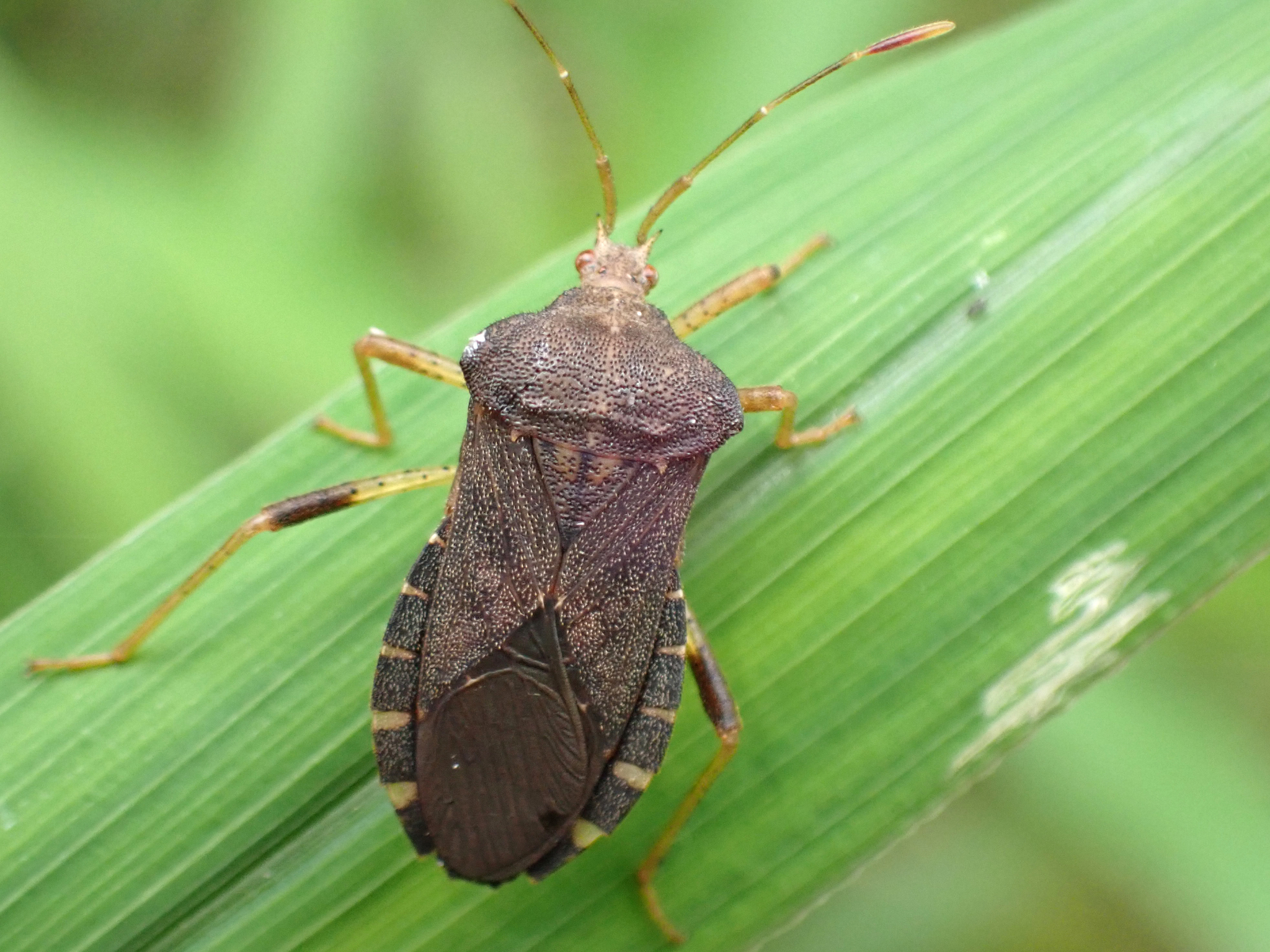

Scientific classification
- Domain: Eukaryota
- Kingdom: Animalia
- Phylum: Arthropoda
- Class: Insecta
- Order: Hemiptera
- Suborder: Heteroptera
- Family: Coreidae
- Genus: Anasa
- Species: A. scorbutica

Binomial name
- Anasa scorbutica (Fabricius, 1775)

= Anasa scorbutica =

Species of true bug

Anasa scorbutica is a species of leaf-footed bug in the family Coreidae. It is found in the Caribbean, Central America, North America, South America, and the Caribbean.
