= Squeah =

Locality in British Columbia, Canada

Squeah is a locality in the lower Fraser Canyon of British Columbia, Canada, located between the unincorporated town of Yale (N) and the district municipality of Hope on the Fraser River. Squeah Indian Reserve No. 6 of the Yale First Nation, is located here, at the mouth of Suka Creek. Tiny Squeah Lake is on the south side of the locality at 49°28′51″N 121°24′21″W. The mountain above the community on the east side of the canyon, at 49°31′18″N 121°23′14″W is called Squeah Mountain by the members of the Yale First Nation.

== See also ==
- List of communities in British Columbia
