= Dustin Allard Degree =

American politician

Dustin Degree
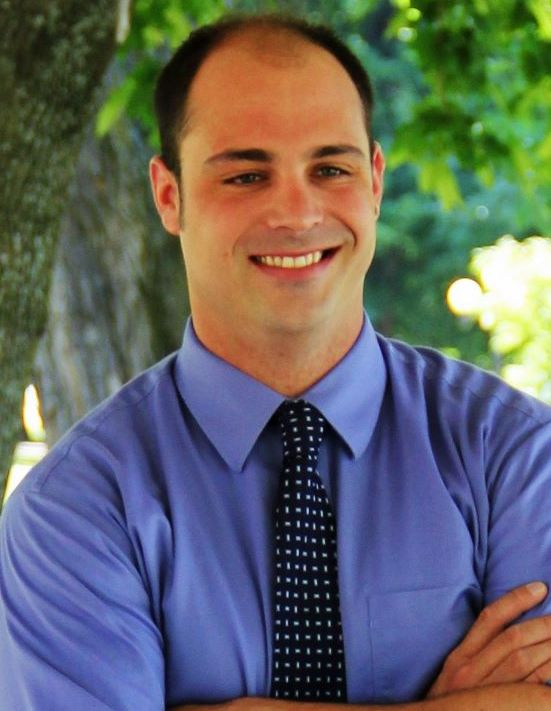

Minority Leader of the Vermont Senate
- In office January 6, 2017 – November 15, 2017
- Preceded by: Joe Benning
- Succeeded by: Joe Benning

Member of the Vermont Senate from the Franklin district
- In office January 7, 2015 – November 15, 2017
- Preceded by: Donald Collins
- Succeeded by: Randy Brock

Member of the Vermont House of Representatives from the St. Albans City district
- In office January 5, 2011 – January 3, 2013
- Preceded by: Jeff Young
- Succeeded by: Mike McCarthy

Personal details
- Born: February 12, 1985 (age 41)
- Party: Republican
- Education: Tilton School; Norwich University; University of Vermont
- Website: www.dustindegree.com

Dustin Allard Degree (born February 12, 1985) is a politician from the city of St. Albans in the U.S. state of Vermont. A Republican, he represented St. Albans in the Vermont General Assembly during the 2011-2012 biennial session. Degree graduated from Bellows Free Academy, St. Albans in 2003, attended the Tilton School in 2004, and attended Norwich University and the University of Vermont. He worked in the office of Governor Jim Douglas.

In June 2010, Degree left his job in the governor's office to run for the Vermont House of Representatives, seeking the Franklin-3 District seat in the General Assembly to represent St. Albans City. He cited fiscal responsibility and the need to provide more opportunities to young Vermonters as his top priorities during the campaign.

On November 2, 2010, Degree defeated one-term incumbent State Representative Jeff Young by 243 votes to secure one of the two seats in the district. When he took office on January 5, 2011, at 25 years old, he was the second youngest member of the Vermont General Assembly and the youngest Republican serving in the Legislature. Degree was also the principal in the St. Albans consulting company Champlain Strategies, LLC.

In 2012, Degree ran for the State Senate; he won a nomination for one of Franklin County's two seats. In the general election, he was defeated by only 34 votes, a result which was confirmed by a recount.

Degree ran again in 2014; in November, he won election to one of Franklin County's two seats.

In 2016, Degree was reelected to a second term. In January 2017, the Republican members of the State Senate chose him to serve as minority leader.

Degree resigned from the Senate in November 2017 in order to join the administration of Governor Phil Scott as special assistant to the governor and executive director of workforce expansion.

In December 2017, Scott announced that he had appointed Randy Brock to fill the Senate vacancy caused by Degree's resignation.

== Electoral history ==
Vermont General Assembly Election 2010
Party	Candidate	Votes	%	±%
Democratic	Kathleen Keenan (incumbent)	1025	30.11	
Republican	Dustin Allard Degree	968	28.44	
Democratic	Jeff Young (incumbent)	725	21.30	
Republican	Newell Decker	686	20.15	

Vermont General Assembly Election 2014
Party	Candidate	Votes	%	±%
Democratic	Sara Branon Kittell	4972	21.5	
Republican	Dustin Allard Degree	6862	29.7	
Democratic	William Alan Roberts	3925	17	
Republican	Norm McAllister	6554	28.3	
	Michael Malone	823	3.6	
