= Anasa armigera =

Scientific classification
- Domain: Eukaryota
- Kingdom: Animalia
- Phylum: Arthropoda
- Class: Insecta
- Order: Hemiptera
- Suborder: Heteroptera
- Family: Coreidae
- Genus: Anasa
- Species: A. armigera

Binomial name
- Anasa armigera (Say, 1825)

Species of true bug

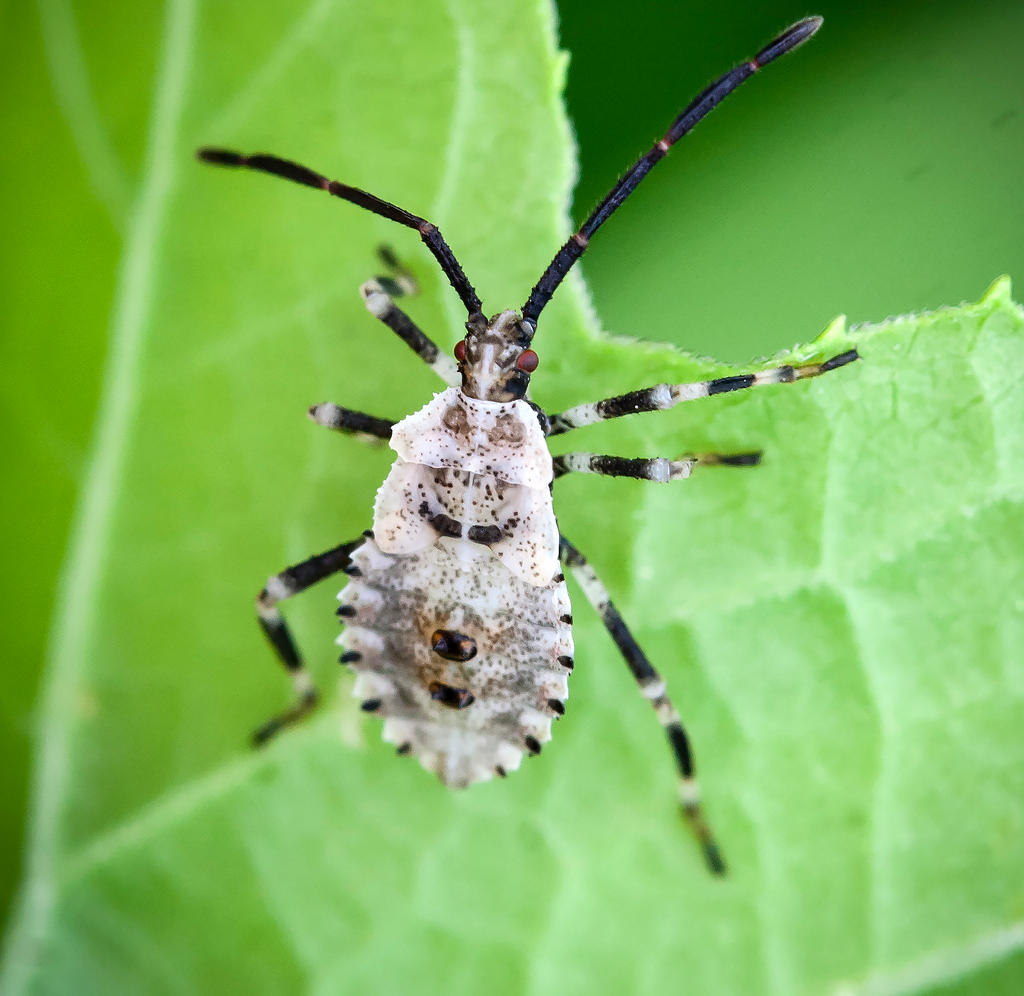
Horned Squash Bug (Anasa armigera) nymph

Anasa armigera, the horned squash bug, is a species of leaf-footed bug in the family Coreidae. It is found in North America.
