= Choate House =

Choate House may refer to:

- Choate House (New York), the former residence of Dr. George C. S. Choate at Pace University
- Choate House (Randallstown, Maryland), listed on the NRHP in Maryland
- Choate House (Massachusetts), a historic house in Essex, Massachusetts, birthplace of lawyer and public citizen Rufus Choate.
