= Matthew Choate =

American politician

Member of the Vermont Senate from the Caledonia Vermont Senate District, 2002–2012 district
- In office 2009–2011
- Preceded by: George R. Coppenrath
- Succeeded by: Joe Benning

Personal details
- Born: May 6, 1971 (age 55) St. Johnsbury, Vermont, U.S.
- Party: Democratic
- Profession: Nurse

Matthew Choate (born May 6, 1971) is a former legislator in the Vermont Senate. He was elected in 2008. He was one of two senators in the Caledonia Vermont Senate District, 2002–2012. He resides in St. Johnsbury, Vermont. He is a Democrat.

== Biography ==
Choate was born in St. Johnsbury, Vermont May 6, 1971. He was the eldest son of Jonathan and Wanda Rexford Choate.

He graduated from the University of Vermont with a Bachelor of Science in biochemistry in 1992 and a Bachelor of Science in nursing in 1997. He was a nurse manager, Dartmouth Hitchcock Medical Center, Emergency Clinical Coordinator, Central Vermont Hospital Center. He was a nurse at the Vermont Poison Center, Fletcher Allen Health Care. He currently manages the pediatric ICU at Dartmouth Hitchcock.

== See also ==
- Members of the Vermont Senate, 2009-2010 session

== Footnotes ==
Political offices
Preceded by George R. Coppenrath	Vermont State Senator from Caledonia County (St. Johnsbury); 2009–2011	Succeeded by Joe Benning
