= Choate, British Columbia =

Locality in British Columbia, Canada

Choate (/tʃoʊt/ CHOHT) is a locality in the lower Fraser Canyon of British Columbia, Canada, approximately midway between the unincorporated town of Yale (N) and the district municipality of Hope. A post office operated at Choate from 1923 to 1939. The designation of "flagstop" was changed to "locality" in 1984.

Stullawheets Indian Reserve No. 8 of the Yale First Nation is located at Choate, around its Canadian Pacific Railway "station" (flagstop). Stulkawhits Creek, the namesake of the reserve, is at 49°28′18″N 121°25′07″W, flowing east out of the southern Lillooet Ranges.

== Name origin ==
Choate was named for CPR bridge construction foreman James Zacchaeus Choate, 1863–1930, who began work with the railway in 1888. He was born in Wentworth County, Ontario and educated in that county and in Haldiman County. He had previously worked for the Grand Trunk Pacific from 1880. His specialty was wooden bridge construction and resided in Vancouver, marrying a Miss Alice Crick in 1893 and had six children by her.

== See also ==
- List of communities in British Columbia
