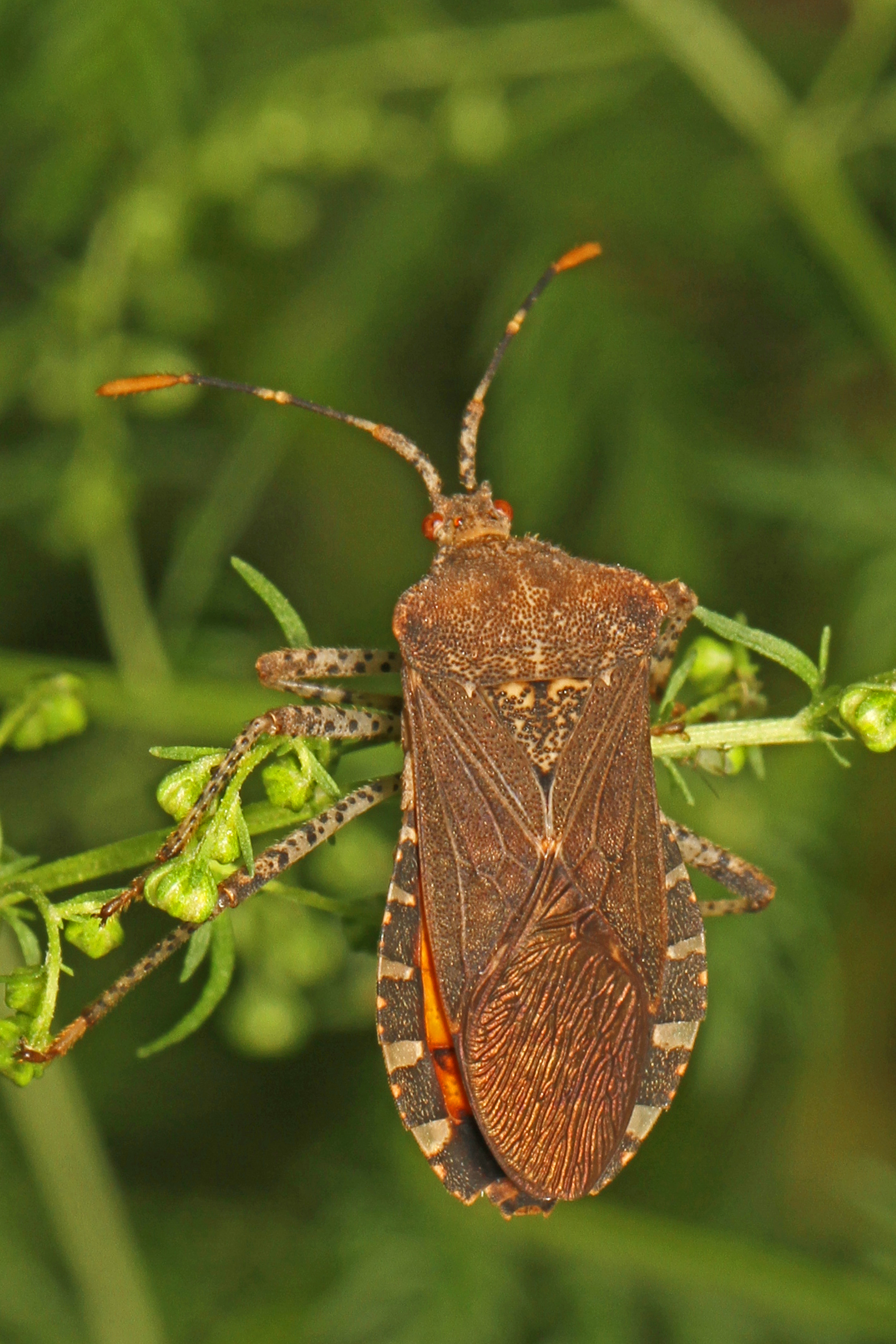

Scientific classification
- Kingdom: Animalia
- Phylum: Arthropoda
- Clade: Pancrustacea
- Class: Insecta
- Order: Hemiptera
- Suborder: Heteroptera
- Family: Coreidae
- Tribe: Coreini
- Genus: Anasa
- Species: A. repetita

Binomial name
- Anasa repetita Heidemann, 1905

= Anasa repetita =

Species of true bug

Anasa repetita is a species of leaf-footed bug in the family Coreidae. It is found in North America.

== Ecology ==
The annual vine Echinocystis lobata, known as wild cucumber or prickly cucumber, has been reported as a food source and host plant for Anasa repetita, which feeds along the stem and developing roots. A. repetita specimens collected in 2006 from an E. lobata in Wisconsin were the first recording of the bug in that state.
