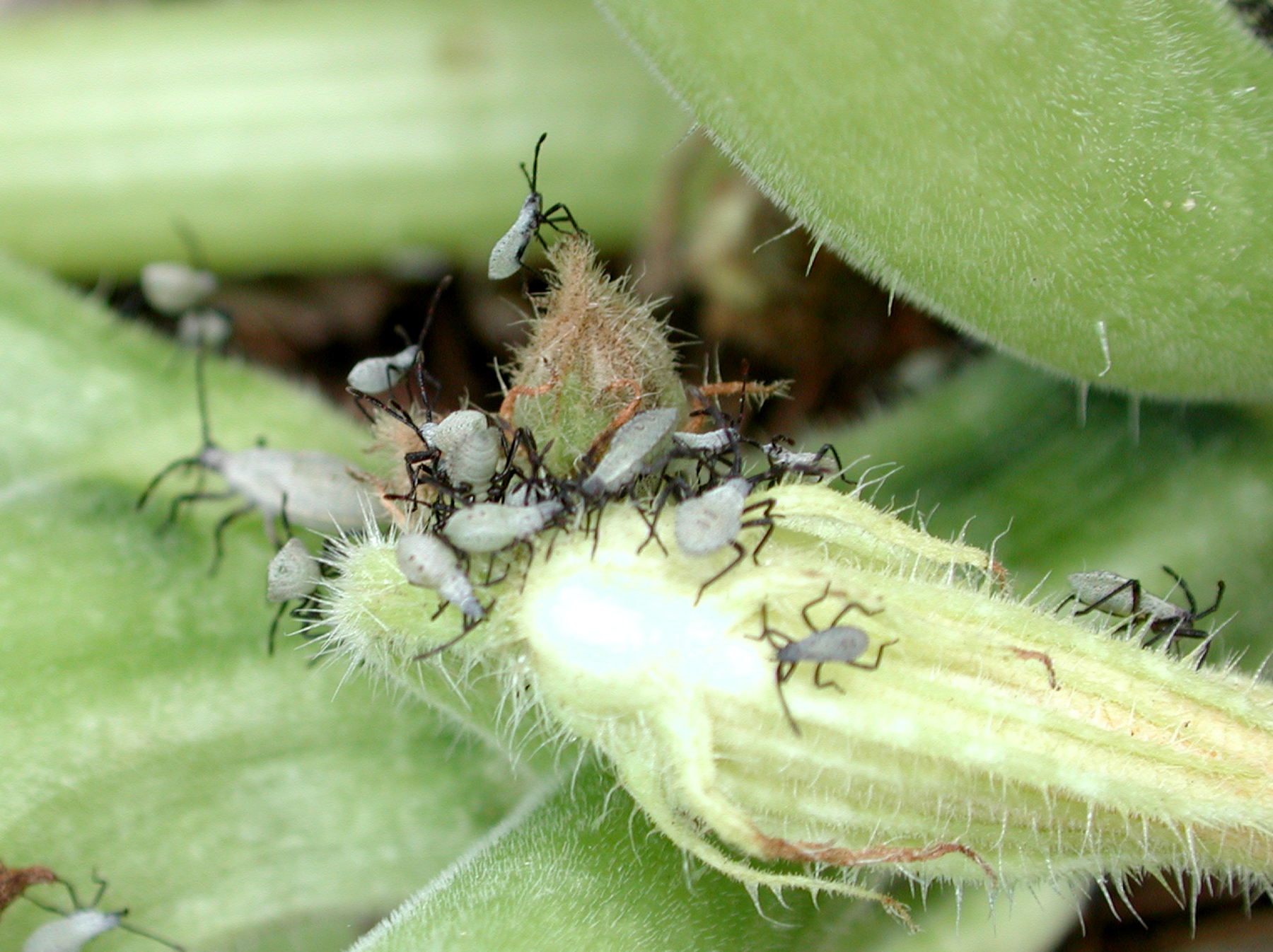
- Nymphs on a squash plant

Scientific classification
- Kingdom: Animalia
- Phylum: Arthropoda
- Clade: Pancrustacea
- Class: Insecta
- Order: Hemiptera
- Suborder: Heteroptera
- Family: Coreidae
- Genus: Anasa
- Species: A. tristis

Binomial name
- Anasa tristis (De Geer), 1773

= Anasa tristis =

Species of true bug

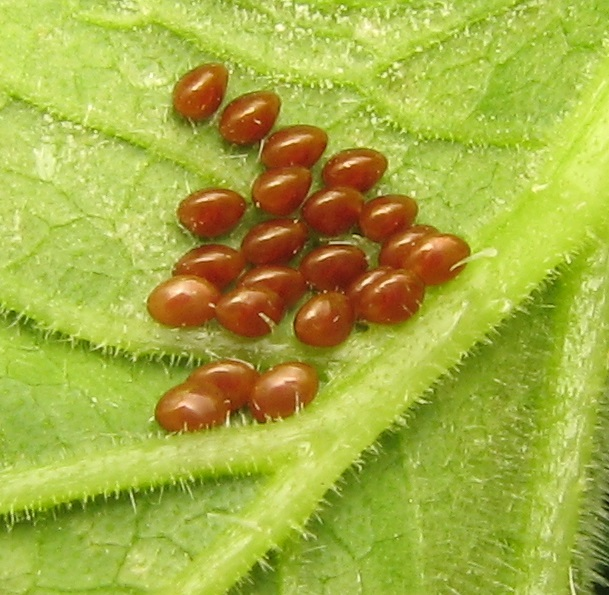
Eggs on underside of squash plant's leaf

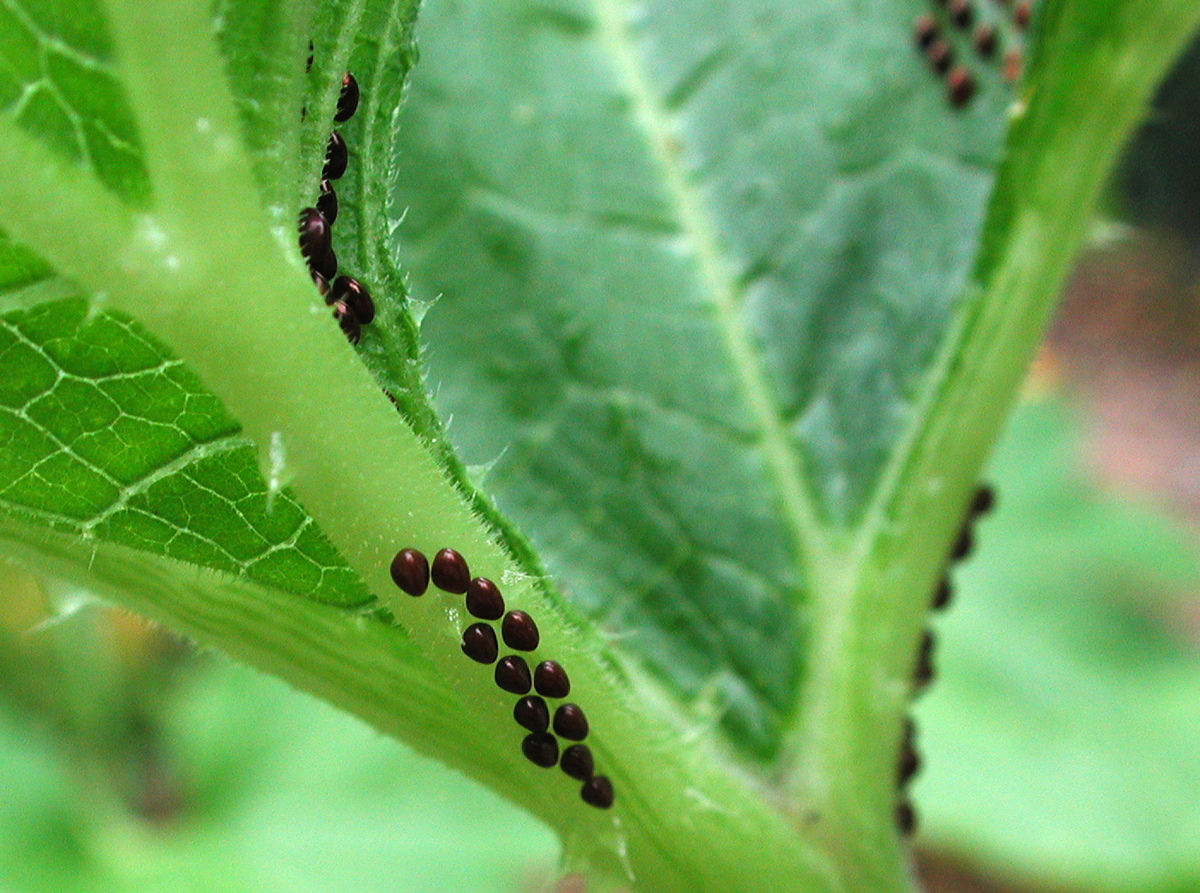
Squash bug eggs on the underside of yellow crookneck squash leaves

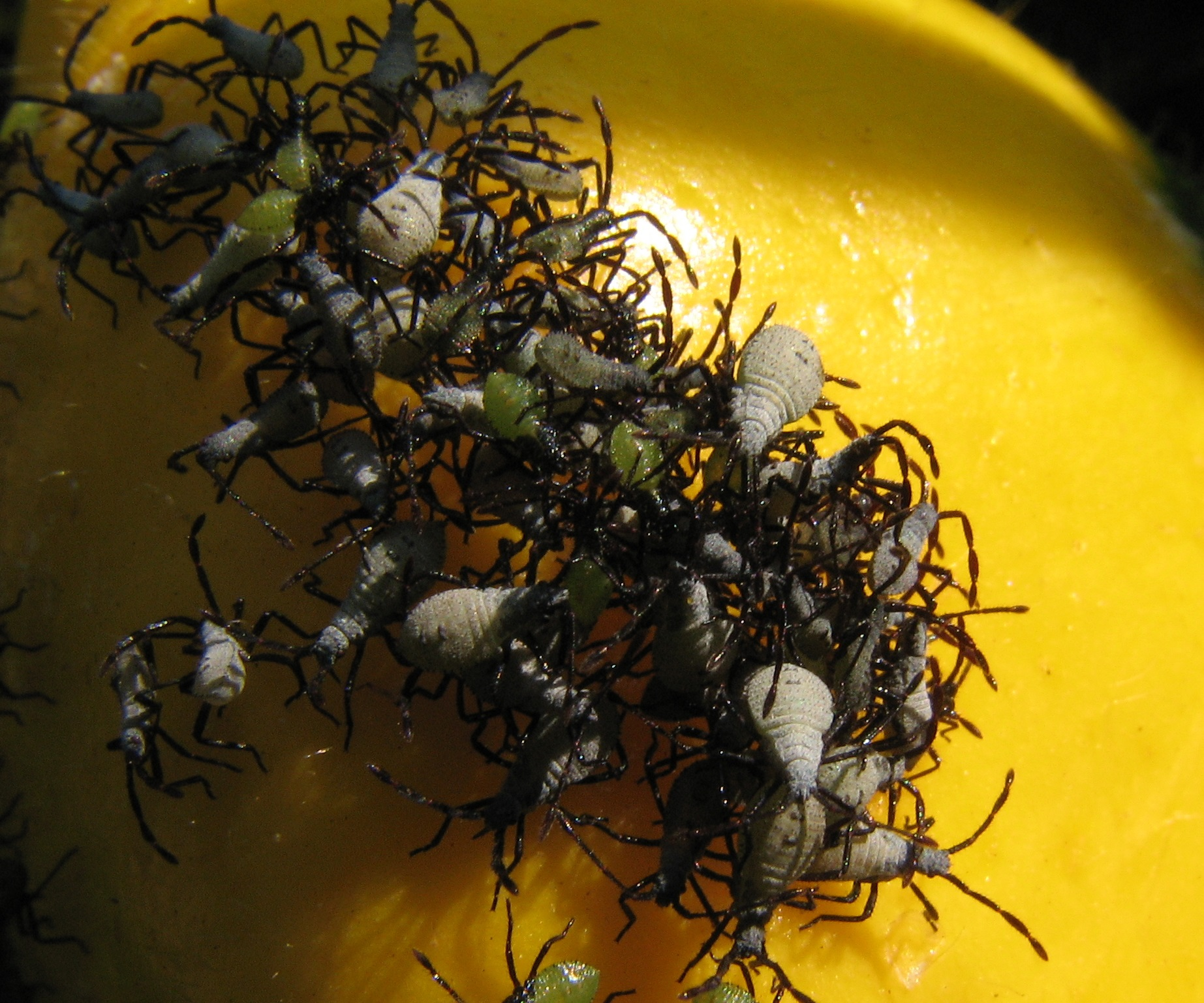
Nymphs of several instars, on squash

Squash bugs including a Sphecidae wasp investigating them and a feather-legged tachinid fly quickly depositing another egg on one of them.

Mating pair of squash bugs.

Anasa tristis is a species of bug in the family Coreidae. It is a major pest of squash and pumpkins, found throughout North America, and is a vector of the cucurbit yellow vine disease bacterium. These bugs can emit an unpleasant odor when disturbed. It is commonly known as the squash bug but shares this name with certain other species.

== Description ==
The adult A. tristis is a greyish-brown, somewhat flattened insect reaching a length of about 1.5 cm (0.6 in) and a width of 0.75 cm (0.3 in). There is often a row of alternate brown and gold spots along the margin of the abdomen. Adults survive for three or four months.

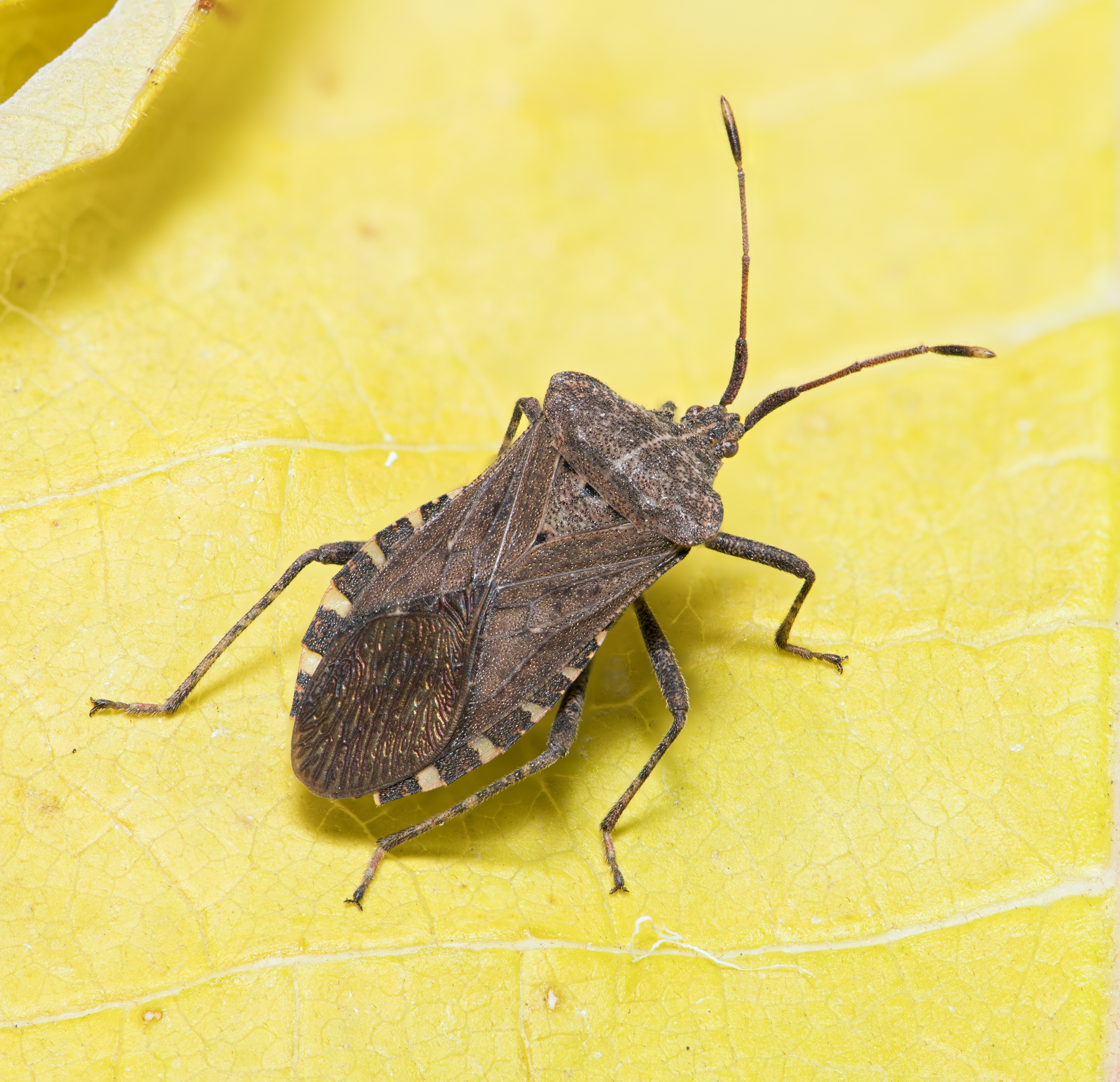
Adult

== Host plants ==
Anasa tristis can be found on various members of the gourd family Cucurbitaceae, but most often occurs on pumpkins and squashes. Some varieties and cultivars are more susceptible to attack than others. Research has shown that nymphs can grow to adulthood with varying degrees of success on different host plants; 70%, 49%, 14%, 0.3% and 0% survived to maturity on pumpkin, squash, watermelon, cucumber and cantaloupe melon respectively. Nymphs can develop from the first instar to the second instar when fed on pumpkin, cucumber, or even water alone, but only pumpkin allows development to the third instar. Nymphs fed on cucumbers live longer than those who fed on water alone.

== Life cycle ==
In the southern part of its range, the adult female A. tristis lays two or three batches of about 18 eggs, but in the northern part of the range it just lays a single batch. The eggs are oval, somewhat flattened and bronze in colour, and are deposited on the underside of the leaves of the host plant. They may be clustered close together or more widely dispersed but are often regularly arranged. The eggs hatch after 7-9 days into nymphs which have five instars. The first instar nymphs are green and about 2.5 mm (0.1 in) in length. Each successive instar is larger and less hairy and grey. The fifth instar is grey, with developing wing pads and about 10 mm (0.4 in) in length. The complete nymphal stage lasts about 33 days.

== Damage ==
Anasa tristis is a true bug that feeds by sucking sap, mainly from the leaves, but sometimes also the fruit. Historically, at least as far back as 1902, some gardeners believed that A. tristis had toxic saliva, however more recent research from 1993 suggests the process of harming plants does not involve any toxins. What happens is that the insects physically damage the xylem and leaves of the plant, which causes them to wilt, darken in colour and die. The heavier the infestation, the greater the damage to the plant. Sometimes one plant or part of a plant can be heavily attacked while surrounding plants are untouched. Besides the direct damage their feeding causes to the plant, these insects can act as vectors for cucurbit yellow vine disease caused by the bacterium Serratia marcescens. This disease can kill the plants.
