= 2024 Vermont Senate election =

Political event in the United States

- November 5, 2024

All 30 seats in the Vermont Senate 16 seats needed for a majority
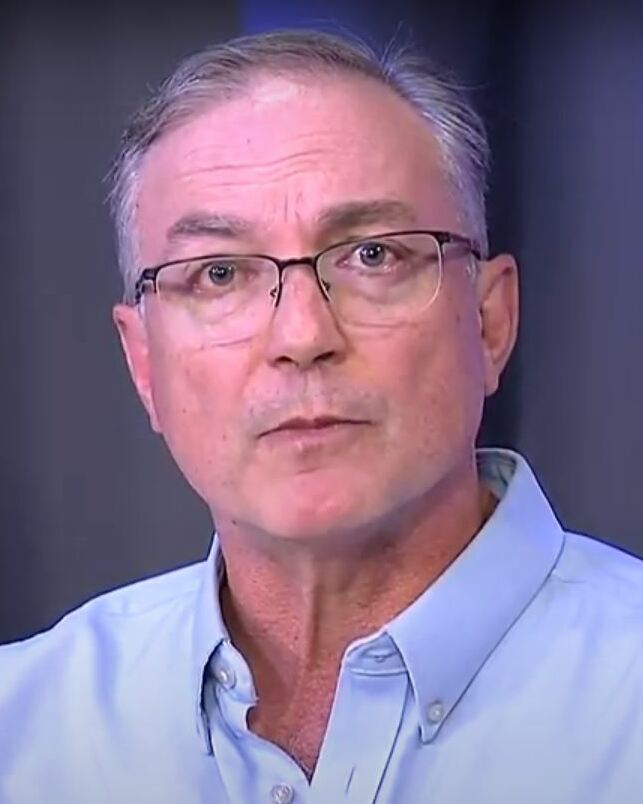

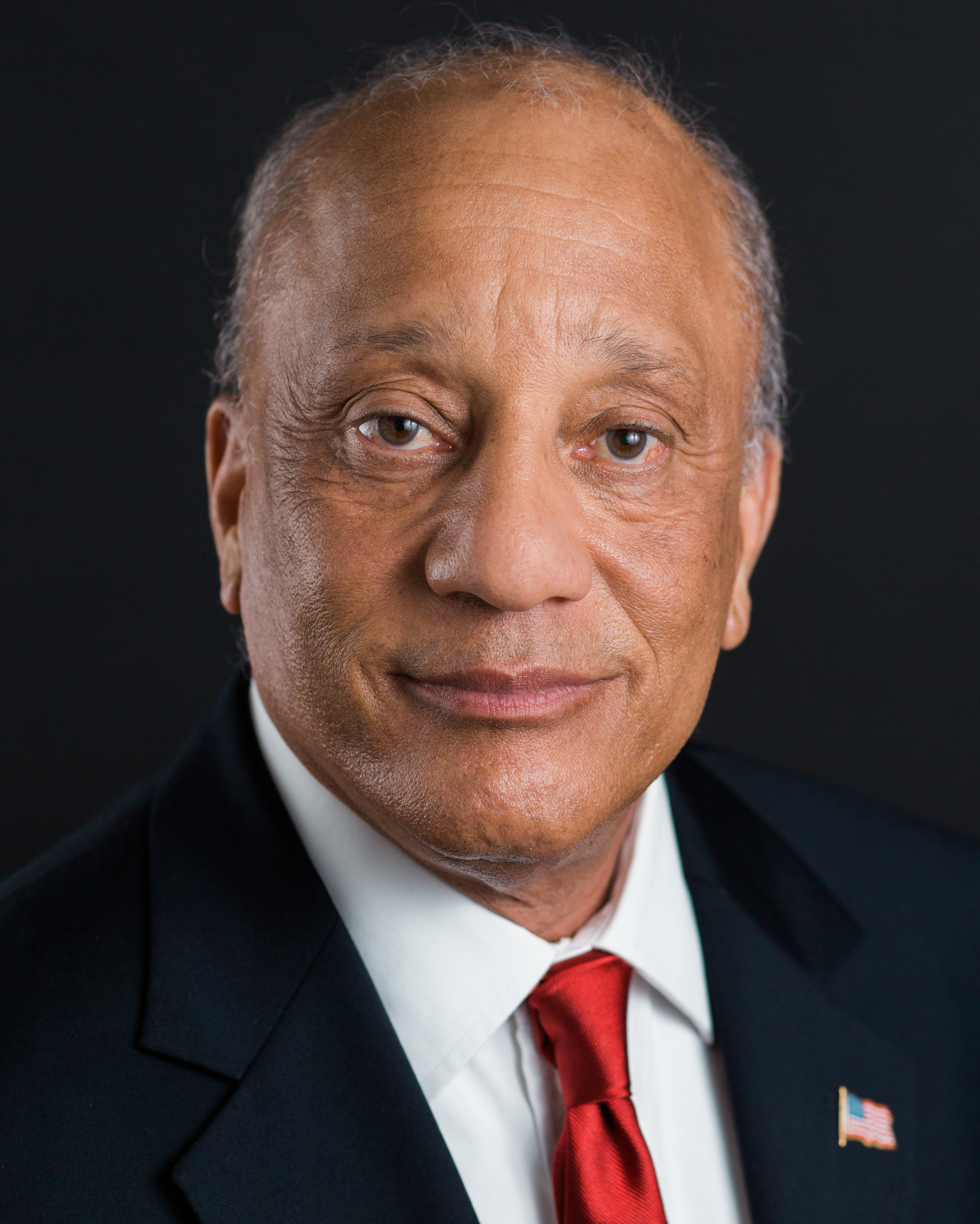

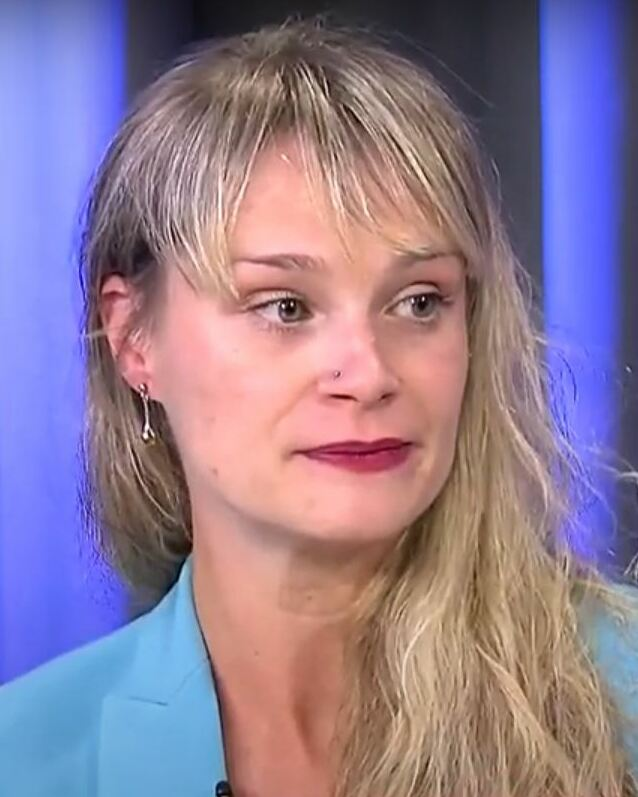
	Majority party	Minority party	Third party
Leader	Philip Baruth	Randy Brock	Tanya Vyhovsky (de facto)
Party	Democratic	Republican	Progressive
Leader since	November 13, 2022	January 6, 2021	January 6, 2023
Leader's seat	Chittenden Central	Franklin	Chittenden Central
Last election	22 seats	7 seats	1 seat
Seats before	22	7	1
Seats won	16	13	1
Seat change	▼6	▲6	Steady
Popular vote	341,868	264,791	15,936
Percentage	52.6%	40.7%	2.5%
Swing	▼12.5%	▲11.2%	▲0.3%
- Results: Republican gain Democratic hold Republican hold Progressive hold
President pro tempore before election
Philip Baruth
Democratic/Progressive
Elected President pro tempore
Philip Baruth
Democratic/Progressive

The 2024 Vermont Senate election took place on November 5, 2024, as part of the biennial United States elections. The election coincided with elections for other offices including the U.S. President, U.S. Senate, U.S. House, Governor, and State House. State senators serve two-year terms in the Vermont Senate. Primary elections were held on August 13, 2024.

Vermont voters elected all 30 state senators from 16 districts, with each district electing between one and three senators. Districts that elect more than one senator use plurality block voting; in districts that elect two senators, each voter can select up to two candidates on their ballot, and in districts that elect three senators, voters can select up to three candidates. Under Vermont's electoral fusion system, candidates can receive the nomination of more than one party, with all their nominations being listed on the ballot.

Prior to the election, the Democrat–Progressive coalition held a 23-seat supermajority in the senate. In order to gain control of the chamber, Republicans either needed to flip nine seats in the senate, or flip eight seats and the office of lieutenant governor, which presides over the senate and acts as the tiebreaking vote. However, they only needed to flip four seats to end their opponents' supermajority. Ultimately, Republicans, aided by popular GOP governor Phil Scott campaigning for downballot Republican candidates harder than he had in previous years, flipped six seats in the state senate, thus successfully breaking the Democrats' supermajority, and requiring Republican support to overturn Phil Scott's vetoes. The decline in Democratic showing was notable as they received fewer votes collectively in 2024, than the 2022 midterms.

== Members not seeing reelection ==
Four incumbents did not seek re-election.

=== Democrats ===
1. Bennington: Brian Campion retired.
2. Caledonia: Jane Kitchel retired.
3. Orleans: Robert Starr retired to run for Justice of the Peace in Troy.
4. Windsor: Richard McCormack retired.

== Predictions ==
Source	Ranking	As of
Sabato's Crystal Ball	Safe D	October 23, 2024

== Results ==
Party	Candidates		Votes	%	Primary seats			Secondary seats		
Party	Primary	Secondary	Votes	%	Before	After	+/−	Before	After	+/−
Democratic	25	4	341,868	52.6	22 (Note: In the 2022 election, 22 of the elected senators were primarily Democrats. However, 3 of the elected senators were primarily affiliated with a different party but were also nominated by the Democratic Party and listed "Democratic" on the ballot as a secondary nomination.)	16	▼6	3	4	▲1
Republican	25	0	264,791	40.7	7 (Note: In the 2022 election, 7 of the elected senators were primarily Republicans. However, 1 of the elected senators was primarily affiliated with a different party but was also nominated by the Republican Party and listed "Republican" on the ballot as a secondary nomination.)	13	▲6	1	0	▼1
Progressive	1	3	15,936	2.5	1 (Note: In the 2022 election, 1 of the elected senators was primarily a Progressive. However, 4 of the elected senators were primarily affiliated with a different party but were also nominated by the Progressive Party and listed "Progressive" on the ballot as a secondary nomination. Additionally, the elected senator that is primarily a Progressive was listed "Democratic" on the ballot as a secondary nomination.)	1	Steady	4	3	▼1
Independent	7	–	24,486	3.8	0	0	Steady	0	0	Steady
Write-ins	N/A		2,865	0.4	N/A					
Total	58	7	649,946	100.0	30	30	Steady	8	7	▼1

District	Incumbent	Party	Elected Senator	Party
Addison	Ruth Hardy	Dem	Ruth Hardy	Dem
Addison	Christopher Bray	Dem	Steven Heffernan	Rep
Bennington	Vacant	n/a	Seth Bongartz	Dem
Bennington	Brian Campion	Dem	Rob Plunkett	Dem
Caledonia	Jane Kitchel	Dem	Scott Beck	Rep
Chittenden Central	Philip Baruth	Dem/Prog	Philip Baruth	Dem/Prog
Chittenden Central	Martine Gulick	Dem	Martine Gulick	Dem
Chittenden Central	Tanya Vyhovsky	Prog/Dem	Tanya Vyhovsky	Prog/Dem
Chittenden North	Irene Wrenner	Dem	Chris Mattos	Rep
Chittenden Southeast	Thomas Chittenden	Dem	Thomas Chittenden	Dem
Chittenden Southeast	Ginny Lyons	Dem	Ginny Lyons	Dem
Chittenden Southeast	Kesha Ram Hinsdale	Dem/Prog	Kesha Ram Hinsdale	Dem/Prog
Essex	Russ Ingalls	Rep/Dem	Russ Ingalls	Rep
Franklin	Randy Brock	Rep	Randy Brock	Rep
Franklin	Robert Norris	Rep	Robert Norris	Rep
Grand Isle	Andy Julow	Dem	Patrick Brennan	Rep
Lamoille	Richard Westman	Rep/Dem	Richard Westman	Rep/Dem
Orange	Mark MacDonald	Dem	Larry Hart	Rep
Orleans	Robert Starr	Dem	Sam Douglass	Rep
Rutland	Brian Collamore	Rep	Brian Collamore	Rep
Rutland	Dave Weeks	Rep	Dave Weeks	Rep
Rutland	Terry Williams	Rep	Terry Williams	Rep
Washington	Ann Cummings	Dem	Ann Cummings	Dem
Washington	Andrew Perchlik	Dem/Prog	Andrew Perchlik	Dem/Prog
Washington	Anne Watson	Dem/Prog	Anne Watson	Dem/Prog
Windham	Wendy Harrison	Dem	Wendy Harrison	Dem
Windham	Nader Hashim	Dem	Nader Hashim	Dem
Windsor	Alison Clarkson	Dem	Alison Clarkson	Dem
Windsor	Richard McCormack	Dem	Joe Major	Dem
Windsor	Rebecca White	Dem	Rebecca White	Dem

== Addison ==
2024 Vermont Senate Addison district election
- November 5, 2024
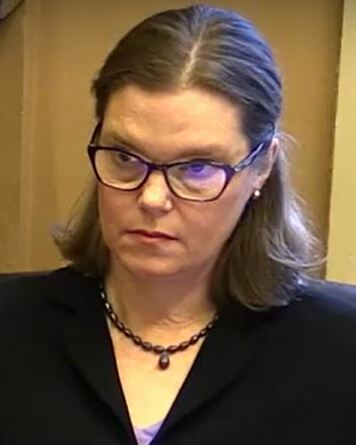

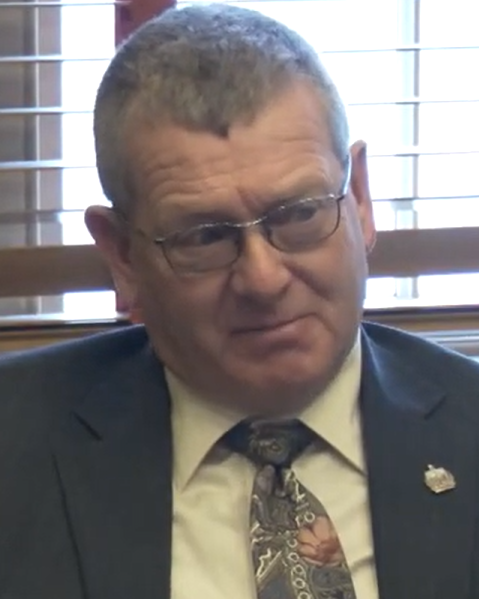

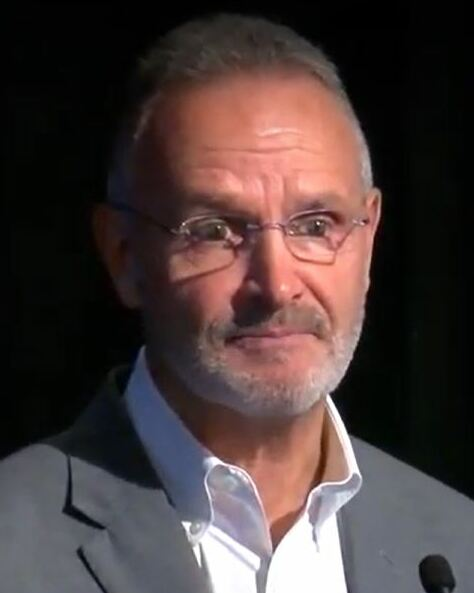
Nominee	Ruth Hardy	Steven Heffernan
Party	Democratic	Republican
Popular vote	11,715	11,645
Percentage	27.48%	27.31%
Nominee	Christopher Bray	Landel Cochran
Party	Democratic	Republican
Popular vote	10,998	8,211
Percentage	25.80%	19.26%
Senators before election
Christopher Bray (Dem)
Ruth Hardy (Dem)
Elected Senators
Ruth Hardy (Dem)
Steven Heffernan (Rep)

- Elects two senators.

The incumbents are Democrats Christopher Bray and Ruth Hardy, who won with 33.8% and 33.3% of the vote in 2022, respectively (67.1% combined).

=== Democratic primary ===
==== Declared ====
- Christopher Bray, incumbent senator
- Caleb Elder, state representative
- Ruth Hardy, incumbent senator

==== Campaign ====
Elder largely avoided criticizing the two incumbents directly, instead saying he decided to run for Senate due to his conflicts with House leadership; Elder alleged that they "made it clear the doors were shut for me to participate." The race was competitive, with all three candidates reporting roughly equal fundraising.

==== Results ====
Addison Senate district Democratic primary election, 2024
Party	Candidate	Votes	%
Democratic	Ruth Hardy (incumbent)	3,435	40.96
Democratic	Christopher Bray (incumbent)	2,722	32.45
Democratic	Caleb Elder	2,148	25.61
Write-in		82	0.98
Total votes		8,387	100.0

=== Republican primary ===
==== Declared ====
- Lesley Bienvenue, secretary of the Addison County Republican Party
- Landel Cochran, vice chair of the Huntington Selectboard
- Steven Heffernan, bomb disposal technician

==== Results ====
Addison Senate district Republican primary election, 2024
Party	Candidate	Votes	%
Republican	Steven Heffernan	1,928	56.62
Republican	Landel Cochran	850	24.96
Republican	Lesley Bienvenue	599	17.59
Write-in		28	0.82
Total votes		3,405	100.0

=== General election ===
==== Results ====
Addison Senate district general election, 2024
Party	Candidate	Votes	%
Democratic	Ruth Hardy (incumbent)	11,715	27.48
Republican	Steven Heffernan	11,645	27.31
Democratic	Christopher Bray (incumbent)	10,998	25.80
Republican	Landel Cochran	8,211	19.26
Write-in		61	0.14
Total votes		42,630	100.0
Democratic hold			
Republican gain from Democratic			

== Bennington ==
2024 Vermont Senate Bennington district election
- November 5, 2024
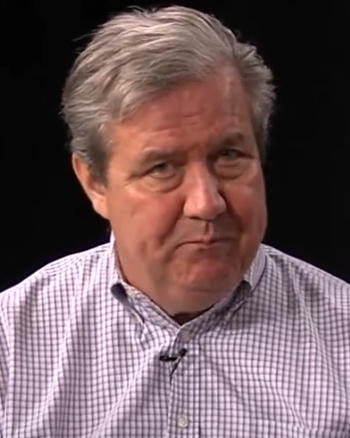

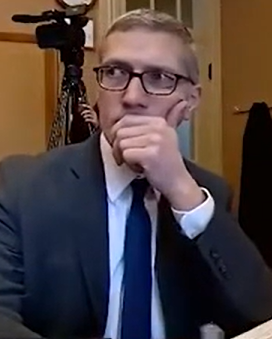

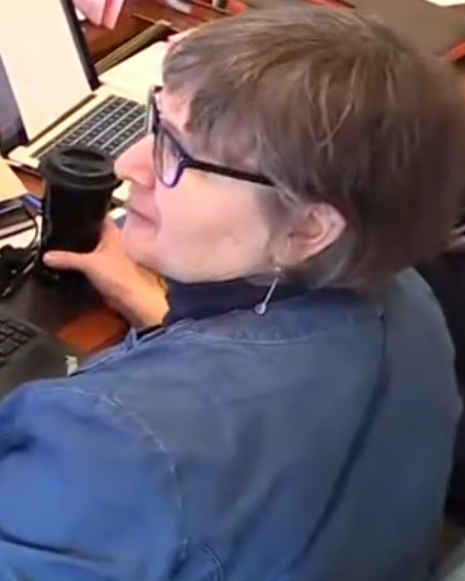

Nominee	Seth Bongartz	Rob Plunkett	Joe Gervais
Party	Democratic	Democratic	Republican
Popular vote	10,053	9,158	8,648
Percentage	27.4%	24.9%	23.5%
Nominee	Lawrence Whitmire	Cynthia Browning	Steve Berry
Party	Independent	Independent	Independent
Popular vote	3,538	2,867	2,459
Percentage	9.6%	7.8%	6.7%
Senators before election
Brian Campion (Dem)
Dick Sears (Dem/Rep) (deceased)
Elected Senators
Seth Bongartz (Dem)
Rob Plunkett (Dem)

- Elects two senators.

The incumbents are Democrats Brian Campion and Dick Sears, who won with only write-in opposition in 2022. Sears filed to run for re-election, while Campion announced he would retire. However, Sears died in June 2024, shortly after the filing deadline.

=== Democratic primary ===
==== Declared ====
- Seth Bongartz, state representative
- Tina Cook, marketing professional (write-in)
- Rob Plunkett, deputy state's attorney (write-in)
- Kate Seaton, technical account manager (write-in)

==== Deceased ====
- Dick Sears, incumbent senator (died June 2024, remained on ballot)

==== Declined ====
- Brian Campion, incumbent senator (endorsed Bongartz and Sears, then Plunkett)

==== Endorsements ====
Seth Bongartz

State legislators

- Brian Campion, state senator for this district
- Dick Sears, state senator for this district
Rob Plunkett (write-in)

State legislators

- Seth Bongartz, state representative
- Brian Campion, state senator for this district
Dick Sears (deceased)

State legislators

- Seth Bongartz, state representative
- Brian Campion, state senator for this district

==== Campaign ====
Despite his death, Sears remained on the ballot in the August Democratic primary; if he won, a convention of delegates from towns in the district would have met to choose a replacement nominee. Several write-in candidates entered the race. One candidate, Manchester selectman Jonathan West, urged Democrats in the district to vote for Sears, hoping to clinch the nomination at a convention.

==== Results ====
Bennington Senate district Democratic primary election, 2024
Party	Candidate	Votes	%
Democratic	Seth Bongartz	2,641	49.02
Democratic	Rob Plunkett (write-in)	1,616	29.99
Democratic	Dick Sears (incumbent) †	837	15.53
Democratic	Kate Seaton (write-in)	105	1.95
Democratic	Tina Cook (write-in)	25	0.46
Write-in		164	3.04
Total votes		5,388	100.0

=== Republican primary ===
==== Declared ====
- Joe Gervais, lumber business owner (also running for state house)

==== Results ====
Bennington Senate district Republican primary election, 2024
Party	Candidate	Votes	%
Republican	Joe Gervais	1,036	83.82
Write-in		200	16.19
Total votes		1,236	100.0

=== Independents ===
==== Declared ====
- Steve Berry, former Democratic state representative (also running for U.S. Senate)
- Cynthia Browning, Arlington selectwoman and former Democratic state representative
- Lawrence Whitmire, construction contractor and conservative activist

==== Results ====
Bennington Senate district general election, 2024
Party	Candidate	Votes	%
Democratic	Seth Bongartz	10,053	27.4%
Democratic	Rob Plunkett	9,158	24.9%
Republican	Joe Gervais	8,648	23.5%
Independent	Lawrence Whitmire	3,538	9.6%
Independent	Cynthia Browning	2,867	7.8%
Independent	Steve Berry	2,459	6.7%
Write-in		60	0.13%
Total votes		36,785	100.0

== Caledonia ==
2024 Vermont Senate Caledonia district election
- November 5, 2024
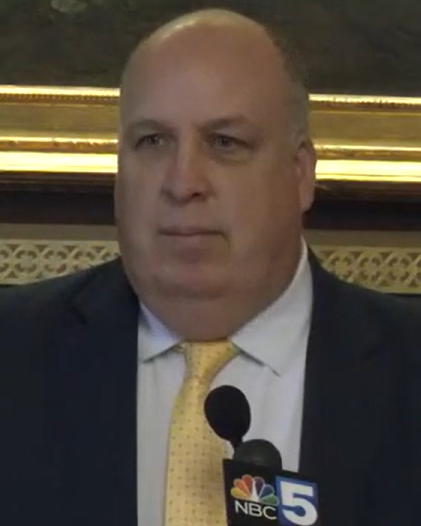

Nominee	Scott Beck	Amanda Cochrane
Party	Republican	Democratic
Popular vote	7,245	5,182
Percentage	58.3%	41.7%
Senators before election
Jane Kitchel
Democratic
Elected Senators
Scott Beck
Republican

- Elects one senator.

The incumbent is Democrat Jane Kitchel, who won with 63.4% of the vote in 2022. Kitchel is not running for re-election.

=== Democratic primary ===
==== Declared ====
- Amanda Cochrane, nonprofit executive
- Shawn Hallisey, nursing home administrator

==== Declined ====
- Jane Kitchel, incumbent senator (endorsed Cochrane)

==== Endorsements ====
Amanda Cochrane

State legislators

- Jane Kitchel, state senator for this district

==== Results ====
Caledonia Senate district Democratic primary election, 2024
Party	Candidate	Votes	%
Democratic	Amanda Cochrane	1,393	87.78
Democratic	Shawn Hallisey	153	9.64
Write-in		41	2.58
Total votes		1,587	100.0

=== Republican primary ===
==== Declared ====
- Scott Beck, state representative
- J.T. Dodge, systems engineer, nominee for this district in 2022 and Libertarian nominee in 2020

==== Endorsements ====
Scott Beck

Statewide officials

- Phil Scott, Governor of Vermont

==== Results ====
Caledonia Senate district Republican primary election, 2024
Party	Candidate	Votes	%
Republican	Scott Beck	1,096	82.47
Republican	J.T. Dodge	223	16.78
Write-in		10	0.75
Total votes		1,329	100.0

=== General election ===
==== Results ====
Caledonia Senate district general election, 2024
Party	Candidate	Votes	%
Republican	Scott Beck	7,245	58.3%
Democratic	Amanda Cochrane	5,182	41.7%
Write-in		24	0.19%
Total votes		12,451	100.0

== Chittenden Central ==
2024 Vermont Senate Chittenden Central district election
- November 5, 2024
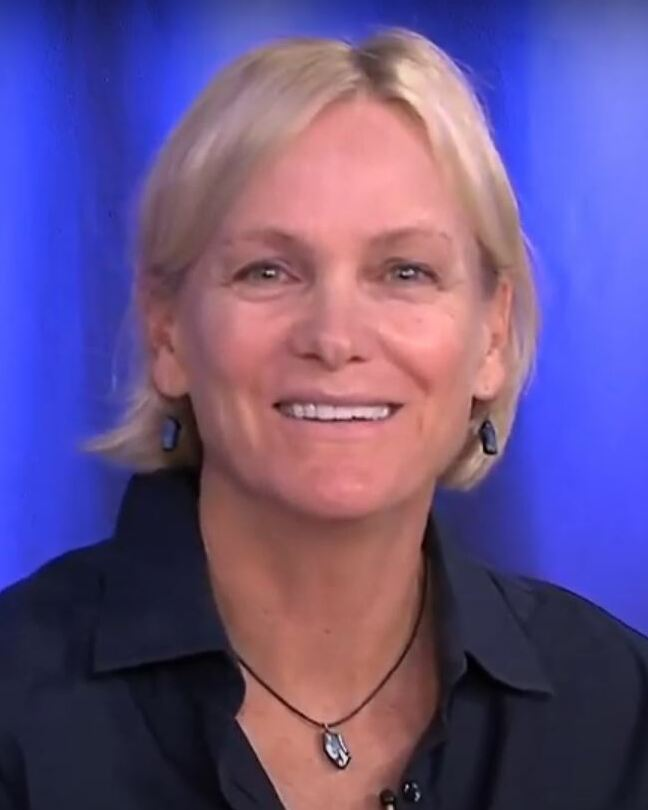

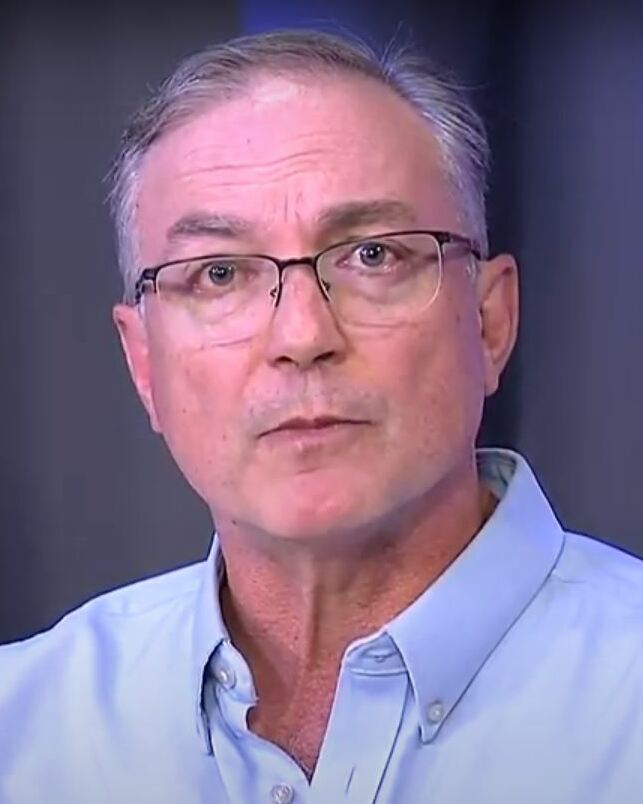

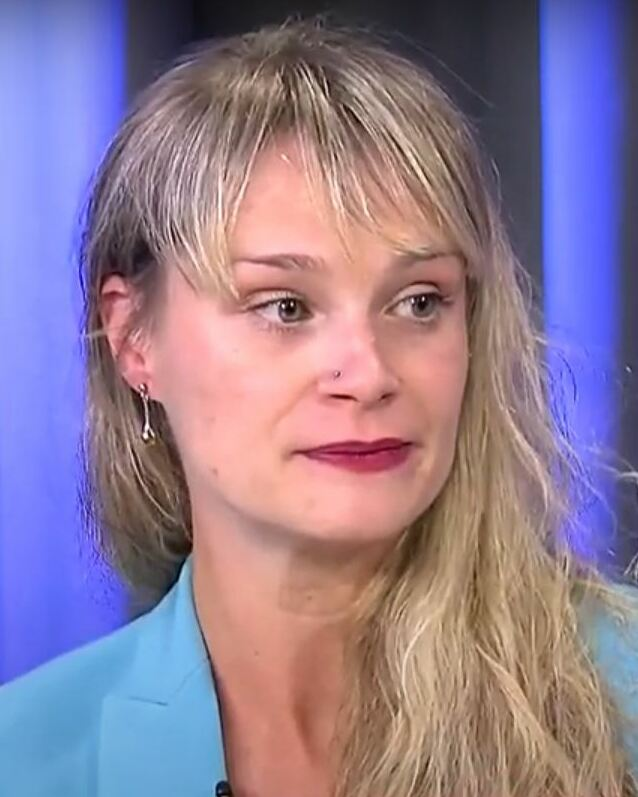
Nominee	Martine Gulick	Philip Baruth	Tanya Vyhovsky
Party	Democratic	Democratic	Progressive
Alliance		Progressive	Democratic
Popular vote	18,191	17,782	15,936
Percentage	34.3%	33.6%	30.1%
Senators before election
Philip Baruth (Dem/Prog)
Martine Gulick (Dem)
Tanya Vyhovsky (Prog/Dem)
Elected Senators
Martine Gulick (Dem)
Philip Baruth (Dem/Prog)
Tanya Vyhovsky (Prog/Dem)

- Elects three senators.

The incumbents are Democrats Philip Baruth and Martine Gulick and Progressive Tanya Vyhovsky, who won with 31.5%, 29.0%, and 25.7% of the vote in 2022, respectively (86.2% combined), against an independent candidate. All three incumbents are running for re-election.

=== Democratic primary ===
==== Declared ====
- Philip Baruth, incumbent senator
- Martine Gulick, incumbent senator
- Stewart Ledbetter, former WPTZ news anchor
- Tanya Vyhovsky, incumbent senator

==== Endorsements ====
Philip Baruth

State legislators

- Martine Gulick, state senator for this district
- Tanya Vyhovsky, state senator for this district
Martine Gulick

State legislators

- Philip Baruth, president pro tempore of the Vermont Senate
- Tanya Vyhovsky, state senator for this district
Steward Ledbetter

Statewide officials

- Phil Scott, Governor of Vermont (Republican)

State legislators

- John Campbell, former president pro tempore of the Vermont Senate
- John Tracy, former state representative
Tanya Vyhovsky

State legislators

- Philip Baruth, president pro tempore of the Vermont Senate
- Martine Gulick, state senator for this district

==== Campaign ====
Ledbetter outlined few policy differences between himself and the district's three incumbents, instead campaigning on his experience as a journalist. However, VTDigger described Ledbetter as a more centrist alternative to the incumbents, and he criticized Vyhovsky for voting against a bill to increase penalties for retail theft. The three incumbents ran together as a slate. Vyhovsky and Gulick criticized Ledbetter for accepting large contributions from Republicans, landlords, and business interests, and for promising to compromise with Republican governor Phil Scott, which Gulick argued could "mean that you have to make compromises on your values."

Ledbetter had significant name recognition and outraised all three incumbents by a wide margin, creating a competitive race. VTDigger wrote that Gulick was "generally considered the most vulnerable of the three incumbents," owing to her narrow victory in the 2022 Democratic primary for this district.

==== Results ====
Chittenden Central Senate district Democratic primary election, 2024
Party	Candidate	Votes	%
Democratic	Martine Gulick (incumbent)	4,197	28.63
Democratic	Philip Baruth (incumbent)	3,818	26.05
Democratic	Tanya Vyhovsky (incumbent)	3,462	23.62
Democratic	Stewart Ledbetter	3,159	21.55
Write-in		42	0.29
Total votes		14,658	100.0

=== General election ===
==== Results ====
Chittenden Central Senate district general election, 2024
Party	Candidate	Votes	%
Democratic	Martine Gulick (incumbent)	18,191	34.3%
Democratic/Progressive	Philip Baruth (incumbent)	17,782	33.6%
Progressive/Democratic	Tanya Vyhovsky (incumbent)	15,936	30.1%
Write-in		1,086	2%
Total votes		52,995	100.0

== Chittenden North ==
2024 Vermont Senate Chittenden North district election
- November 5, 2024
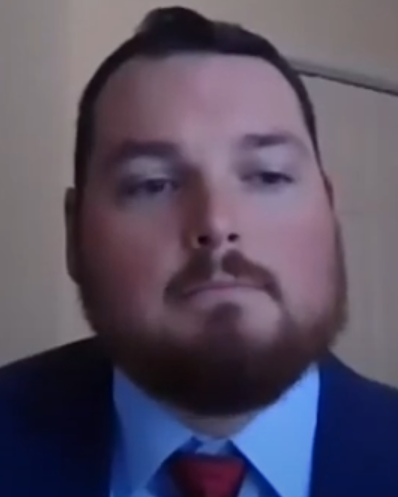

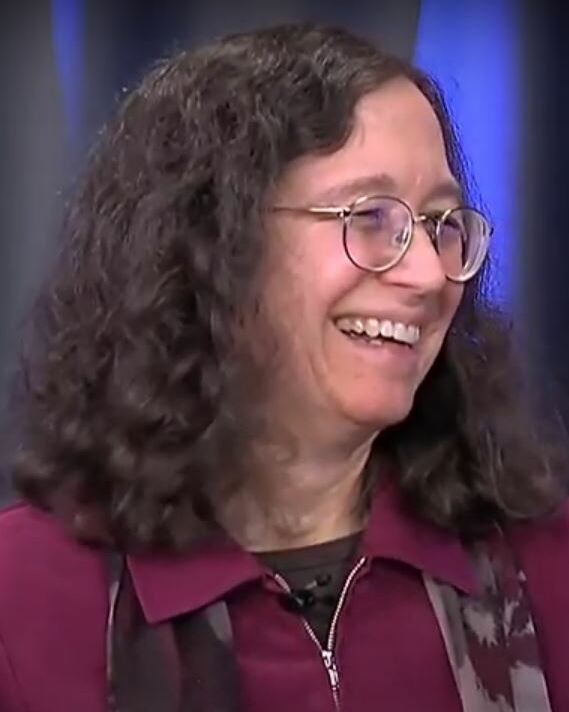
Nominee	Chris Mattos	Irene Wrenner
Party	Republican	Democratic
Popular vote	7,383	5,768
Percentage	56.0%	43.7%
Senator before election
Irene Wrenner
Democratic
Elected Senator
Chris Mattos
Republican

- Elects one senator.

The incumbent is Democrat Irene Wrenner, who won with 51.3% of the vote in 2022.

=== Democratic primary ===
==== Declared ====
- Irene Wrenner, incumbent senator

==== Results ====
Chittenden North Senate district Democratic primary election, 2024
Party	Candidate	Votes	%
Democratic	Irene Wrenner (incumbent)	1,271	96.95
Write-in		40	3.05
Total votes		1,311	100.0

=== Republican primary ===
==== Declared ====
- Chris Mattos, state representative

==== Results ====
Chittenden North Senate district Republican primary election, 2024
Party	Candidate	Votes	%
Republican	Chris Mattos	1,042	99.24
Write-in		8	0.76
Total votes		1,050	100.0

==== Results ====
Chittenden North Senate district general election, 2024
Party	Candidate	Votes	%
Republican	Chris Mattos	7,383	56%
Democratic	Irene Wrenner (incumbent)	5,768	43.7%
Write-in		24	0.3%
Total votes		13,175	100.0

== Chittenden Southeast ==
2024 Vermont Senate Chittenden Southeast district election
- November 5, 2024
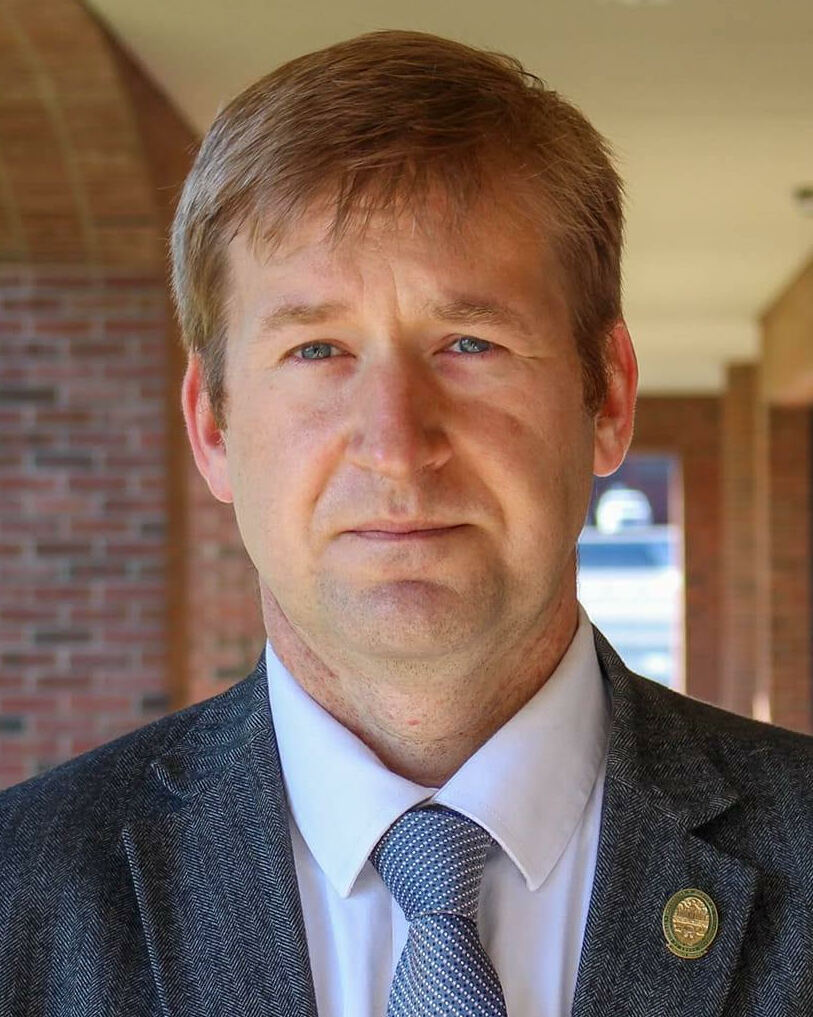

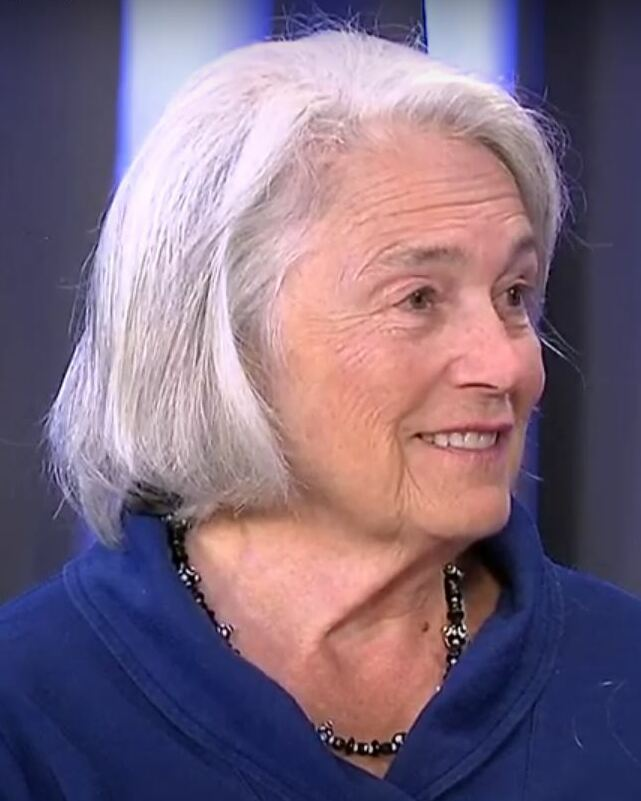

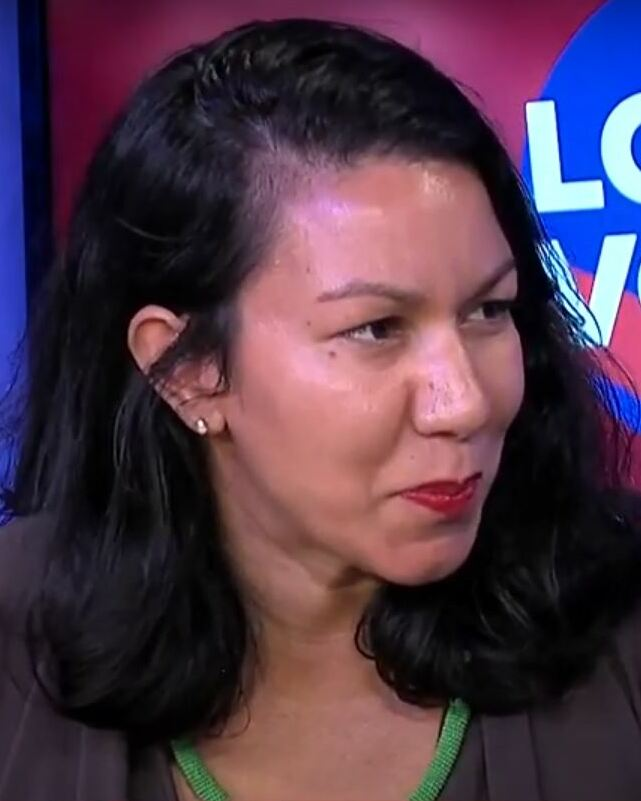

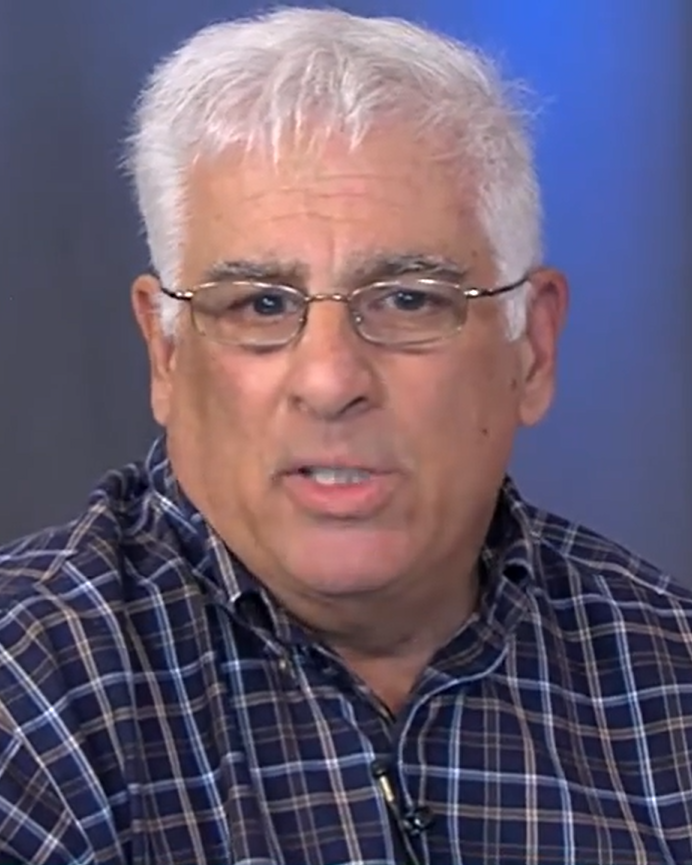
Nominee	Thomas Chittenden	Ginny Lyons	Kesha Ram Hinsdale
Party	Democratic	Democratic	Democratic
Popular vote	28,729	24,931	21,498
Percentage	26.9%	23.3%	20.1%
Nominee	Bruce Roy	Rohan St. Marthe	Taylor Craven
Party	Republican	Republican	Independent
Popular vote	16,080	8,619	7,107
Percentage	15.0%	8.1%	6.6%
Senators before election
Thomas Chittenden (Dem)
Kesha Ram Hinsdale (Dem/Prog)
Ginny Lyons (Dem)
Elected Senators
Thomas Chittenden (Dem)
Kesha Ram Hinsdale (Dem/Prog)
Ginny Lyons (Dem)

- Elects three senators.

The incumbents are Democrats Kesha Ram Hinsdale, Thomas Chittenden and Ginny Lyons, who won with 32.1%, 26.6%, and 25.1% of the vote in 2022, respectively (83.8% combined).

=== Democratic primary ===
==== Declared ====
- Thomas Chittenden, incumbent senator
- Kesha Ram Hinsdale, incumbent senator
- Ginny Lyons, incumbent senator
- Louis Meyers, physician and perennial candidate

==== Results ====
Chittenden Southeast Senate district Democratic primary election, 2024
Party	Candidate	Votes	%
Democratic	Ginny Lyons (incumbent)	6,111	30.43
Democratic	Thomas Chittenden (incumbent)	5,678	28.28
Democratic	Kesha Ram Hinsdale (incumbent)	5,440	27.09
Democratic	Louis Meyers	2,735	13.62
Write-in		117	0.58
Total votes		20,081	100.0

=== Republican primary ===
==== Declared ====
- Bruce Roy, former Essex Junction school board member

==== Results ====
Chittenden Southeast Senate district Republican primary election, 2024
Party	Candidate	Votes	%
Republican	Bruce Roy	1,527	89.93
Write-in		171	10.07
Total votes		1,698	100.0

=== Independents ===
==== Declared ====
- Taylor Craven, former member of the Colchester Planning Commission

=== General election ===
==== Results ====
Chittenden Southeast Senate district general election, 2024
Party	Candidate	Votes	%
Democratic	Thomas Chittenden (incumbent)	28,729	26.9%
Democratic	Ginny Lyons (incumbent)	24,931	23.3%
Democratic	Kesha Ram Hinsdale (incumbent)	21,498	20.1%
Republican	Bruce Roy	16,080	15%
Republican	Rohan St. Marthe	8,619	8.1%
Independent	Taylor Craven	7,107	6.6%
Write-in		290	0.21%
Total votes		107,245	100.0

== Essex ==
2024 Vermont Senate Essex district election
- November 5, 2024
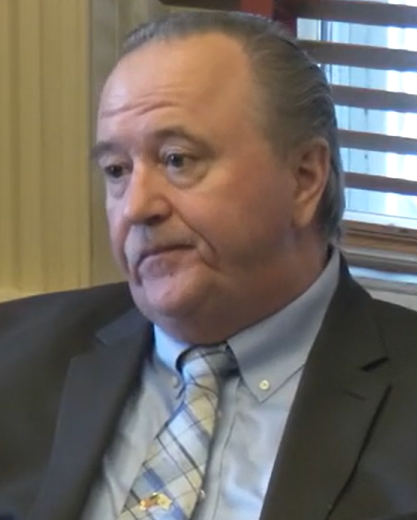
Nominee	Russ Ingalls
Party	Republican
Popular vote	9,070
Percentage	96.2%
Senator before election
Russ Ingalls
Rep/Dem
Elected Senator
Russ Ingalls
Rep/Dem

- Elects one senator.

The incumbent is Republican Russ Ingalls, who won with only write-in opposition in 2022.

=== Republican primary ===
==== Declared ====
- Russ Ingalls, incumbent senator

==== Results ====
Essex Senate district Republican primary election, 2024
Party	Candidate	Votes	%
Republican	Russ Ingalls (incumbent)	1,078	96.94
Write-in		34	3.06
Total votes		1,112	100.0

=== General election ===
==== Results ====
Essex Senate district general election, 2024
Party	Candidate	Votes	%
Republican	Russ Ingalls (incumbent)	9,070	96.2%
Write-in		356	3.8%
Total votes		9,426	100.0

== Franklin ==
2024 Vermont Senate Franklin district election
- November 5, 2024
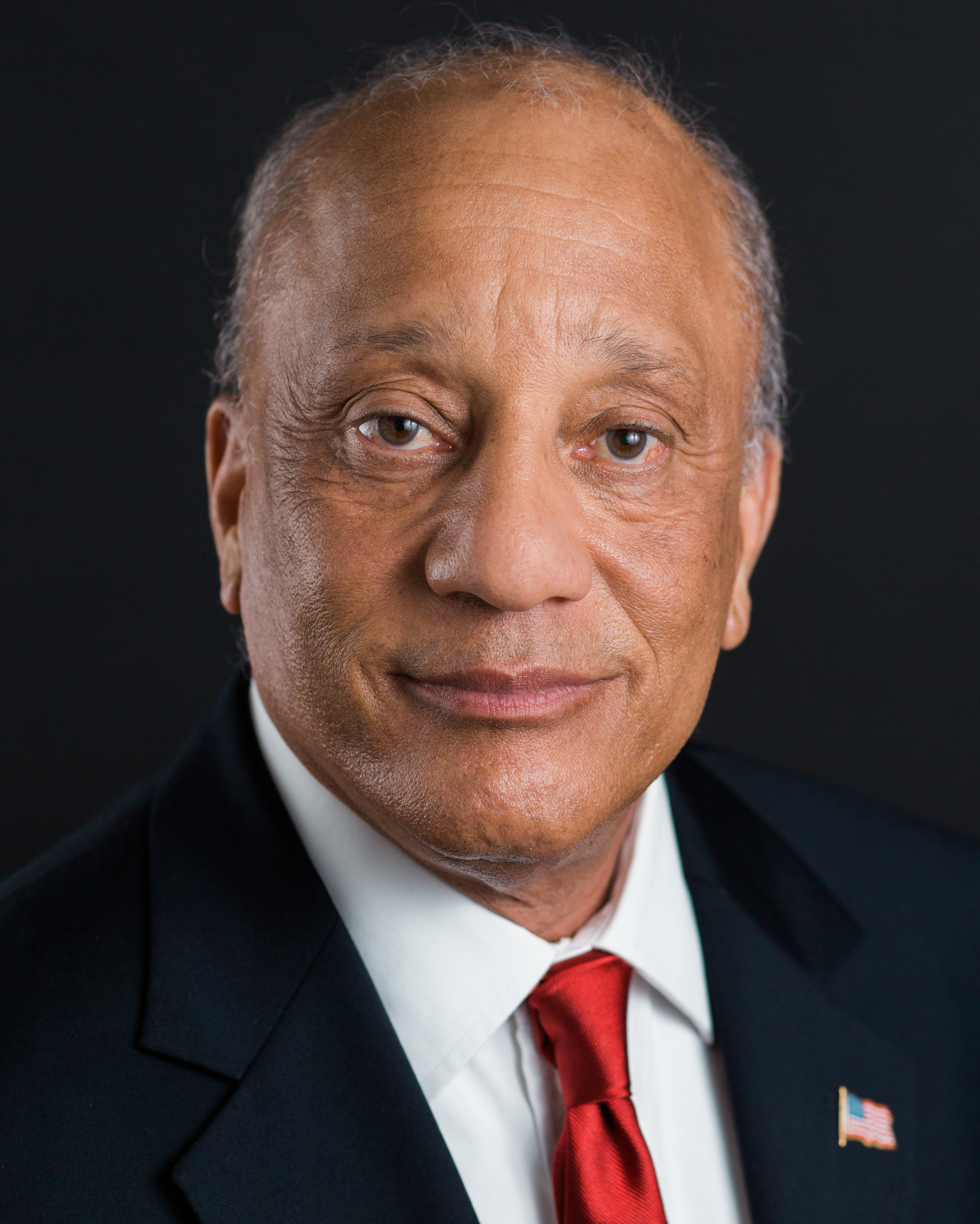

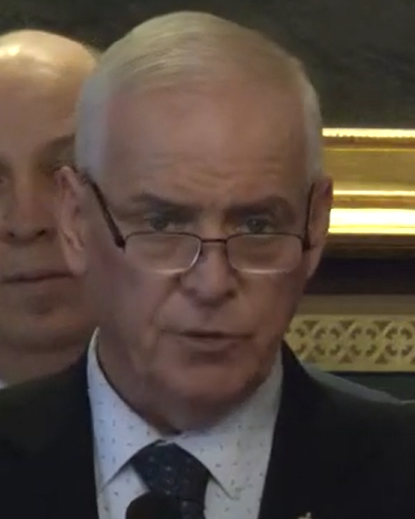
Nominee	Randy Brock	Robert Norris
Party	Republican	Republican
Alliance	Democratic	Democratic
Popular vote	16,411	15,680
Percentage	50.5%	48.2%
Senators before election
Randy Brock (Rep)
Robert Norris (Rep)
Elected Senators
Randy Brock (Rep)
Robert Norris (Rep)

- Elects two senators.

The incumbents are Republicans Randy Brock and Robert Norris, who won with 33.1% and 29.6% of the vote in 2022, respectively (62.7% combined).

=== Republican primary ===
==== Declared ====
- Randy Brock, incumbent senator
- Robert Norris, incumbent senator

==== Results ====
Franklin Senate district Republican primary election, 2024
Party	Candidate	Votes	%
Republican	Randy Brock (incumbent)	1,531	51.36
Republican	Robert Norris (incumbent)	1,432	48.04
Write-in		18	0.60
Total votes		2,981	100.0

=== General election ===
==== Results ====
Franklin Senate district general election, 2024
Party	Candidate	Votes	%
Republican/Democratic	Randy Brock (incumbent)	16,411	50.5%
Republican/Democratic	Robert Norris (incumbent)	15,680	48.2%
Write-in		410	1.3%
Total votes		32,501	100.0

== Grand Isle ==
2024 Vermont Senate Grand Isle district election
- November 5, 2024
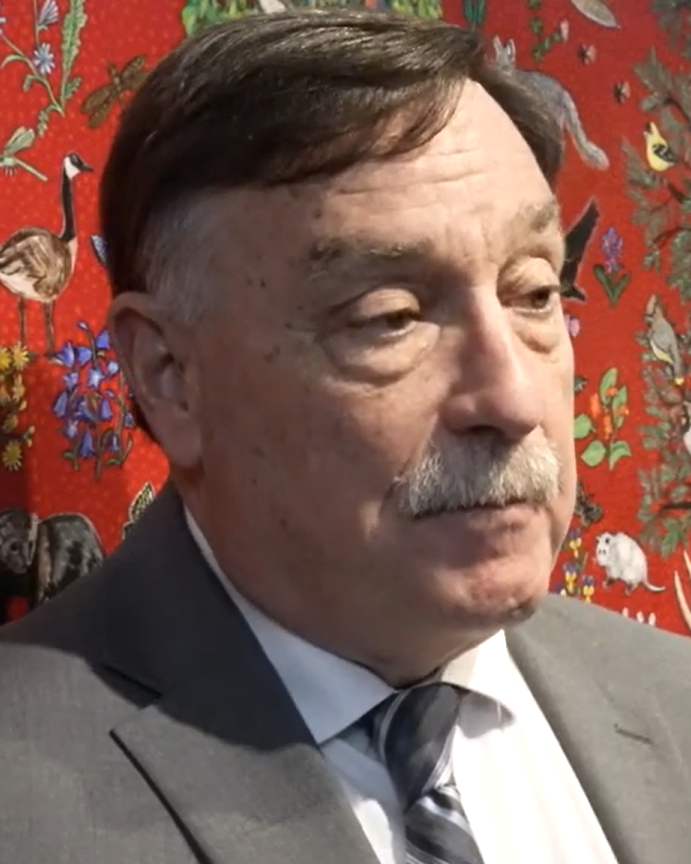

Nominee	Patrick Brennan	Andy Julow
Party	Republican	Democratic
Popular vote	6,744	6,019
Percentage	52.8%	47.1%
Senator before election
Andy Julow
Democratic
Elected Senator
Patrick Brennan
Republican

- Elects one senator.

The incumbent was Democrat Richard Mazza, who won with 73.0% of the vote in 2022. Mazza resigned on April 8, 2024, due to health issues; he later died on May 28. Governor Phil Scott appointed Democrat Andy Julow, a nonprofit executive and former chair of the Champlain Valley School District Board, to Mazza's vacant seat.

=== Democratic primary ===
==== Declared ====
- Julie Hulburd, member of the Vermont Cannabis Control Board and former Colchester selectman
- Andy Julow, incumbent senator

==== Declined ====
- Richard Mazza, former senator (deceased)

==== Results ====
Grand Isle Senate district Democratic primary election, 2024
Party	Candidate	Votes	%
Democratic	Andy Julow (incumbent)	868	51.51
Democratic	Julie Hulburd	792	47.00
Write-in		25	1.48
Total votes		1,685	100.0

=== Republican primary ===
==== Declared ====
- Patrick Brennan, state representative

==== Results ====
Grand Isle Senate district Republican primary election, 2024
Party	Candidate	Votes	%
Republican	Patrick Brennan	911	96.91
Write-in		29	3.09
Total votes		940	100.0

=== General election ===
==== Results ====
Grand Isle Senate district general election, 2024
Party	Candidate	Votes	%
Republican	Patrick Brennan	6,744	52.8%
Democratic	Andy Julow (incumbent)	6,019	47.1%
Write-in		12	0.1%
Total votes		12,775	100.0
Republican gain from Democratic			

== Lamoille ==
2024 Vermont Senate Lamoille district election
- November 5, 2024
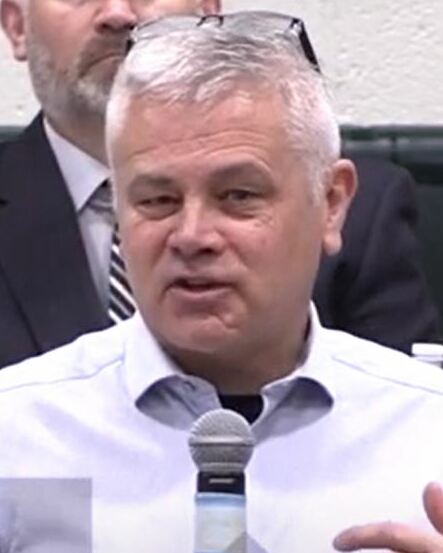

Nominee	Richard Westman	Maureen Heck
Party	Republican	Independent
Alliance	Democratic
Popular vote	7,801	3,868
Percentage	64.0%	35.4%
Senator before election
Richard Westman
Rep/Dem
Elected Senator
Richard Westman
Rep/Dem

- Elects one senator.

The incumbent is Republican Richard Westman, who won against only write-in opposition in 2022.

=== Republican primary ===
==== Declared ====
- Richard Westman, incumbent senator

==== Results ====
Lamoille Senate district Republican primary election, 2024
Party	Candidate	Votes	%
Republican	Richard Westman (incumbent)	769	94.12
Write-in		48	5.88
Total votes		817	100.0

=== Independents ===
==== Declared ====
- Maureen Heck, construction company employee

=== General election ===
==== Results ====
Lamoille Senate district general election, 2024
Party	Candidate	Votes	%
Republican/Democratic	Richard Westman (incumbent)	7,801	64%
Independent	Maureen Heck	3,868	35.4%
Write-in		57	0.7%
Total votes		9,032	100.0

== Orange ==
2024 Vermont Senate Orange district election
- November 5, 2024

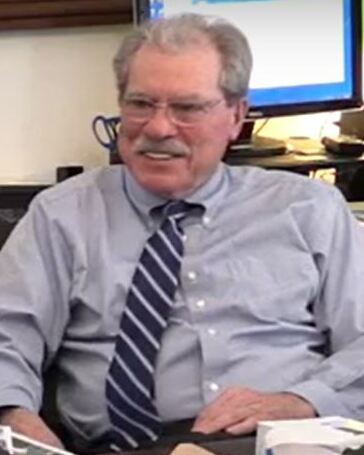
Nominee	Larry Hart	Mark MacDonald
Party	Republican	Democratic
Popular vote	7,230	5,523
Percentage	56.5%	43.1%
Senator before election
Mark MacDonald
Democratic
Elected Senator
Larry Hart
Republican

- Elects one senator.

The incumbent is Democrat Mark MacDonald, who won with 55.4% of the vote in 2022.

=== Democratic primary ===
==== Declared ====
- Mark MacDonald, incumbent senator

==== Results ====
Orange Senate district Democratic primary election, 2024
Party	Candidate	Votes	%
Democratic	Mark MacDonald (incumbent)	1,051	96.33
Write-in		40	3.67
Total votes		1,091	100.0

=== Republican primary ===
==== Declared ====
- Larry Hart, former auto repair shop owner

==== Results ====
Orange Senate district Republican primary election, 2024
Party	Candidate	Votes	%
Republican	Larry Hart	790	99.37
Write-in		5	0.63
Total votes		795	100.0

=== General election ===
==== Results ====
Orange Senate district general election, 2024
Party	Candidate	Votes	%
Republican	Larry Hart	7,230	56.5%
Democratic	Mark MacDonald (incumbent)	5,523	43.1%
Write-in		46	0.4%
Total votes		12,776	100.0

== Orleans ==
2024 Vermont Senate Orleans district election
- November 5, 2024

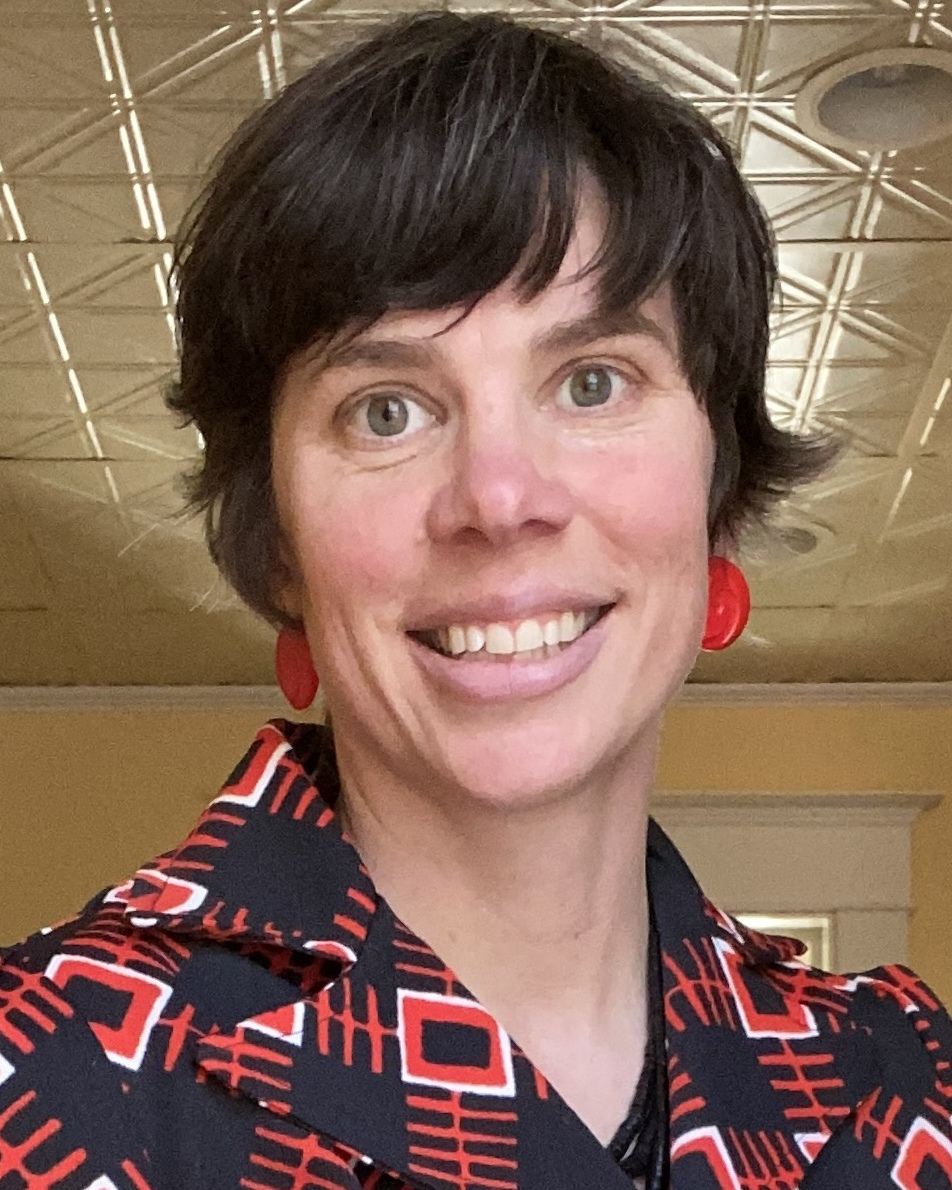
Nominee	Sam Douglass	Katherine Sims
Party	Republican	Democratic
Popular vote	7,168	4,895
Percentage	59.2%	40.4%
Senator before election
Robert Starr
Democratic
Elected Senator
Sam Douglass
Republican

- Elects one senator.

The incumbent is Democrat Robert Starr, who won with 58.1% of the vote in 2022. Starr is not running for re-election.

=== Democratic primary ===
==== Declared ====
- Katherine Sims, state representative

==== Declined ====
- Robert Starr, incumbent senator (endorsed Sims)

==== Endorsements ====
Katherine Sims

State legislators

- Robert Starr, state senator for this district

==== Results ====
Orleans Senate district Democratic primary election, 2024
Party	Candidate	Votes	%
Democratic	Katherine Sims	1,204	96.55
Write-in		43	3.05
Total votes		1,247	100.0

=== Republican primary ===
==== Declared ====
- Conrad Bellavance, former Newport school board member
- Sam Douglass, chair of the Orleans County Republican Party and nominee for this district in 2022

==== Declined ====
- John Rodgers, former Democratic state senator (running for lieutenant governor)

==== Endorsements ====
Sam Douglass

Statewide officials

- Jim Douglas, former Governor of Vermont

State legislators

- Mark Higley, state representative

==== Results ====
Orleans Senate district Republican primary election, 2024
Party	Candidate	Votes	%
Republican	Sam Douglass	713	54.12
Republican	Conrad Bellavance	582	44.19
Write-in		22	1.67
Total votes		1,317	100.0

=== General election ===
==== Results ====
Orleans Senate district general election, 2024
Party	Candidate	Votes	%
Republican	Sam Douglass	7,168	59.2%
Democratic	Katherine Sims	4,895	40.4%
Write-in		38	0.4%
Total votes		12,113	100.0

== Rutland ==
2024 Vermont Senate Rutland district election
- November 5, 2024
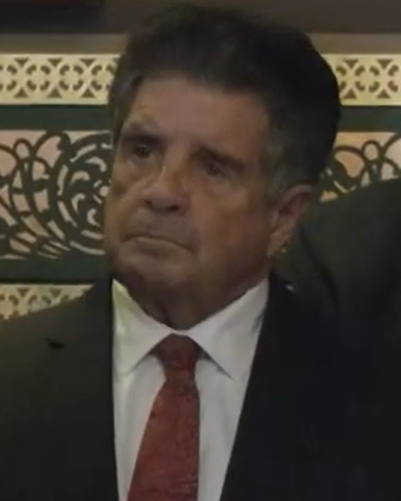

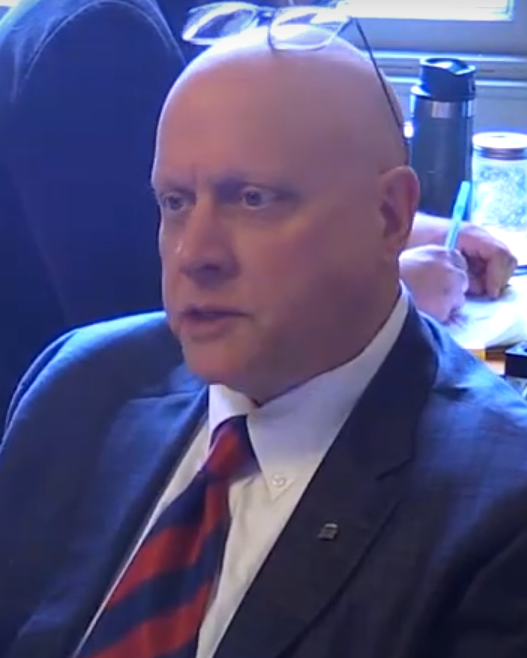

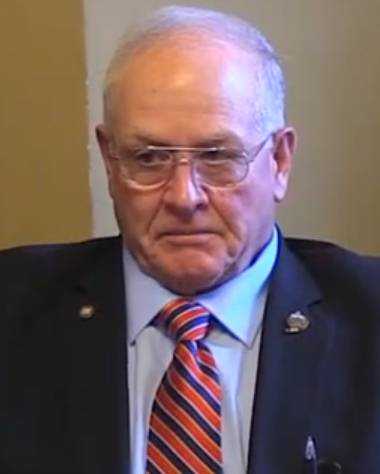
Nominee	Brian Collamore	Dave Weeks	Terry Williams
Party	Republican	Republican	Republican
Popular vote	18,380	16,097	15,998
Percentage	22.5%	19.7%	19.6%
Nominee	Marsha Cassel	Dana Peterson	Robert Richards
Party	Democratic	Democratic	Democratic
Popular vote	12,040	9,704	9,235
Percentage	14.8%	11.9%	11.6%
Senators before election
Brian Collamore (Rep)
Dave Weeks (Rep)
Terry Williams (Rep)
Elected Senators
Brian Collamore (Rep)
Dave Weeks (Rep)
Terry Williams (Rep)

- Elects three senators.

The incumbents are Republicans Brian Collamore, Terry Williams, and Dave Weeks, who won with 21.0%, 17.3%, and 16.3% of the vote in 2022, respectively (54.6% combined).

=== Republican primary ===
==== Declared ====
- Brian Collamore, incumbent senator
- Dave Weeks, incumbent senator
- Terry Williams, incumbent senator

==== Results ====
Rutland Senate district Republican primary election, 2024
Party	Candidate	Votes	%
Republican	Brian Collamore (incumbent)	2,524	35.50
Republican	Dave Weeks (incumbent)	2,409	33.89
Republican	Terry Williams (incumbent)	2,140	30.10
Write-in		36	0.51
Total votes		7,109	100.0

=== Democratic primary ===
==== Declared ====
- Marsha Cassel, retired teacher
- Dana Peterson (write-in)
- Robert Richards, chair of the Fair Haven Selectboard

==== Results ====
Rutland Senate district Democratic primary election, 2024
Party	Candidate	Votes	%
Democratic	Marsha Cassel	2,183	50.53
Democratic	Robert Richards	1,637	37.89
Democratic	Dana Peterson (write-in)	290	6.71
Write-in		210	4.86
Total votes		4,320	100.0

=== General election ===
==== Results ====
Rutland Senate district general election, 2024
Party	Candidate	Votes	%
Republican	Brian Collamore (incumbent)	18,380	22.5%
Republican	Dave Weeks (incumbent)	16,097	19.7%
Republican	Terry Williams (incumbent)	15,998	19.6%
Democratic	Marsha Cassel	12,040	14.8%
Democratic	Dana Peterson	9,704	11.9%
Democratic	Robert Richards	9,235	11.3%
Write-in		100	0.2%
Total votes		81,550	100.0

== Washington ==
2024 Vermont Senate Washington district election
- November 5, 2024
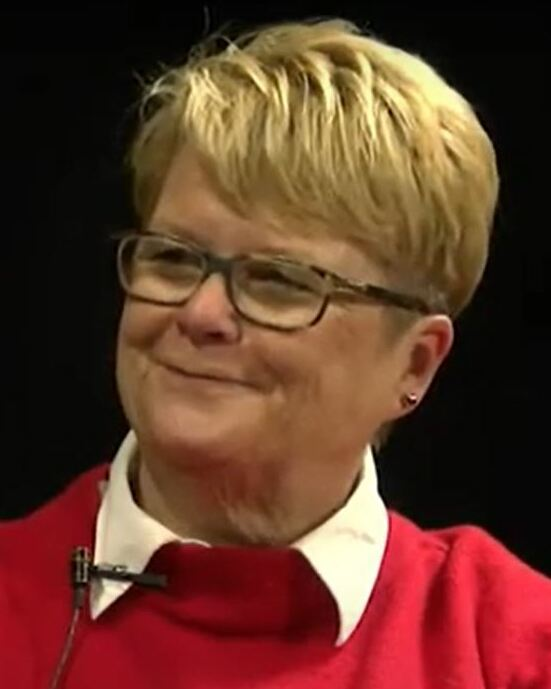

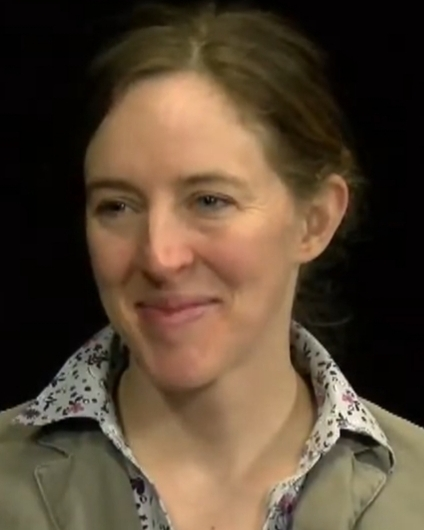

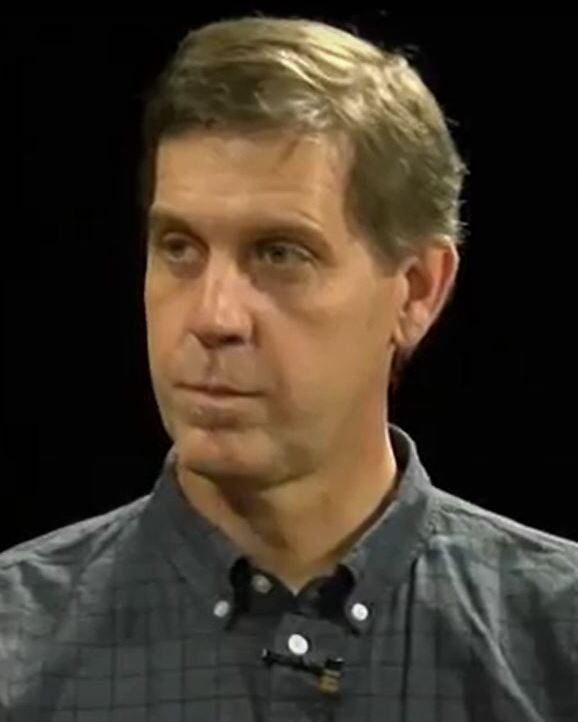

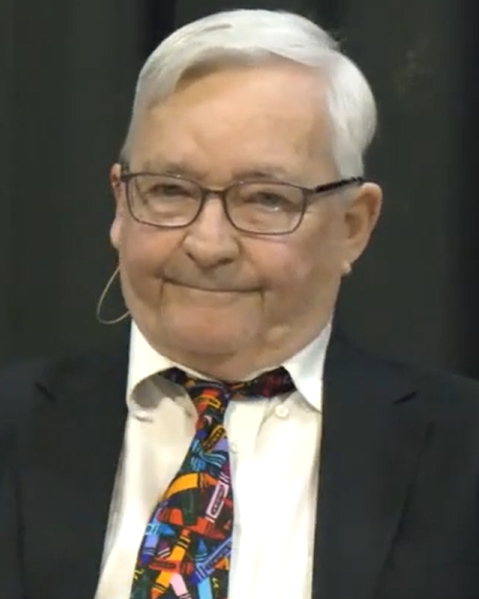

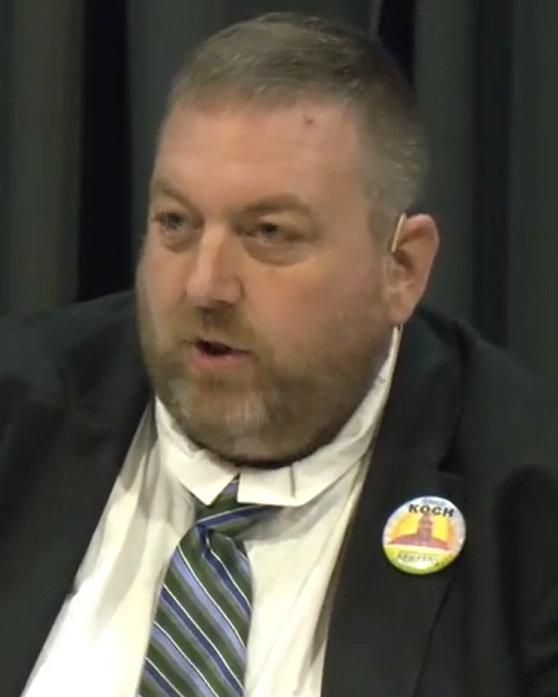

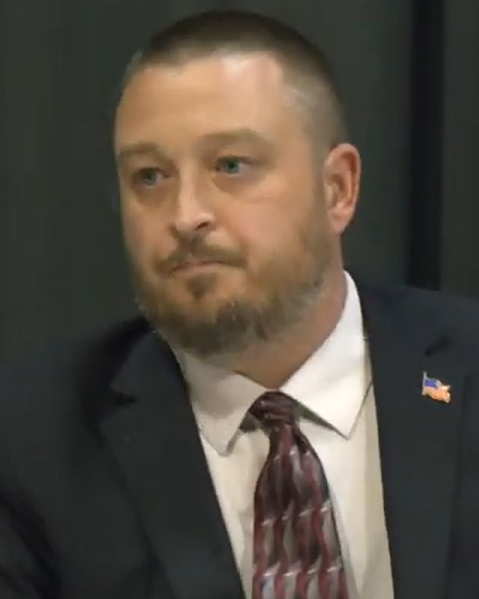
Nominee	Ann Cummings	Anne Watson	Andrew Perchlik
Party	Democratic	Democratic	Democratic
Alliance		Progressive	Progressive
Popular vote	21,814	18,555	17,176
Percentage	22.6%	19.2%	17.8%
Nominee	Mike Doyle	Donald Koch	Michael Deering
Party	Republican	Republican	Republican
Popular vote	13,700	13,639	11,536
Percentage	14.2%	14.1%	11.9%
Senators before election
Ann Cummings (Dem)
Andrew Perchlik (Dem/Prog)
Anne Watson (Dem/Prog)
Elected Senators
Ann Cummings (Dem)
Andrew Perchlik (Dem/Prog)
Anne Watson (Dem/Prog)

- Elects three senators.

The incumbents are Democrats Ann Cummings, Anne Watson, and Andrew Perchlik, who won with 26.2%, 22.9%, and 21.1% of the vote in 2022, respectively (70.2% combined).

=== Democratic primary ===
==== Declared ====
- Ann Cummings, incumbent senator
- Andrew Perchlik, incumbent senator
- Anne Watson, incumbent senator

==== Results ====
Washington Senate district Democratic primary election, 2024
Party	Candidate	Votes	%
Democratic	Ann Cummings (incumbent)	4,754	33.06
Democratic	Andrew Perchlik (incumbent)	4,751	33.03
Democratic	Anne Watson (incumbent)	4,693	32.63
Write-in		186	1.29
Total votes		14,384	100.0

=== Republican primary ===
==== Declared ====
- Michael Deering, Barre city councilor (write-in)
- Donald Koch, chair of the Washington County Republican Party and son of former state representative Tom Koch
- Rob Roper, former president of the Ethan Allen Institute (write-in)

==== Results ====
Washington Senate district Republican primary election, 2024
Party	Candidate	Votes	%
Republican	Donald Koch	2,174	77.78
Republican	Michael Deering (write-in)	220	7.87
Republican	Rob Roper (write-in)	177	6.33
Write-in		224	8.01
Total votes		2,795	100.0

==== Aftermath ====
Rob Roper received enough write-in votes to win the Republican nomination, but dropped out of the race after the primary. Republican Party officials in Washington County were then able to choose a replacement nominee.

===== Replacement nominee =====
- Mike Doyle, innkeeper and nominee for this district in 2016

=== General election ===
==== Results ====
Washington Senate district general election, 2024
Party	Candidate	Votes	%
Democratic	Ann Cummings (incumbent)	21,814	22.6%
Democratic/Progressive	Anne Watson (incumbent)	18,555	19.2%
Democratic/Progressive	Andrew Perchlik (incumbent)	17,176	17.8%
Republican	Mike Doyle	13,700	14.2%
Republican	Donald Koch	13,639	14.1%
Republican	Michael Deering	11,536	11.9%
Write-in		186	0.2%
Total votes		96,632	100.0

== Windham ==
2024 Vermont Senate Windham district election
- November 5, 2024
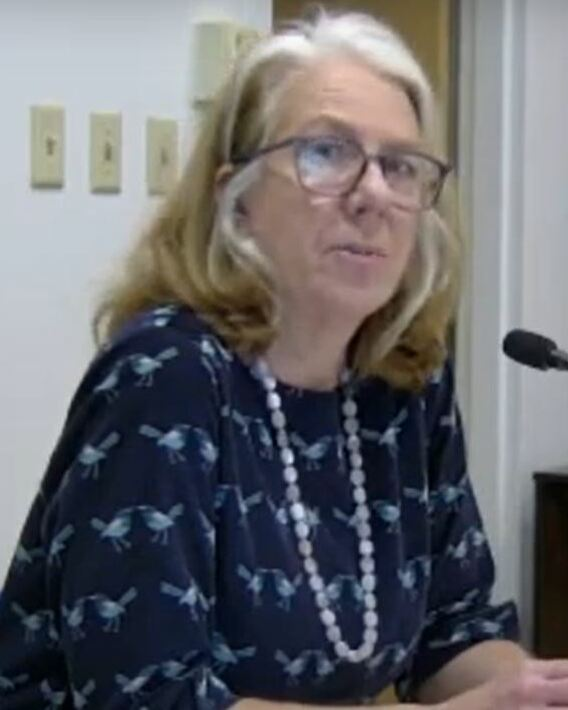

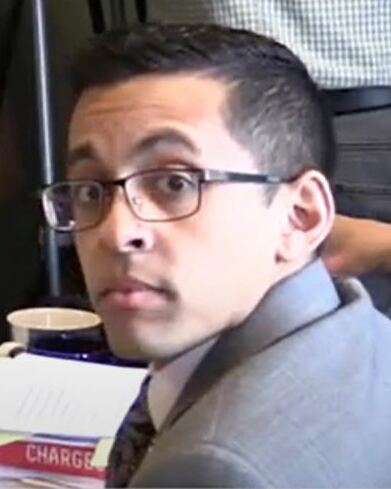

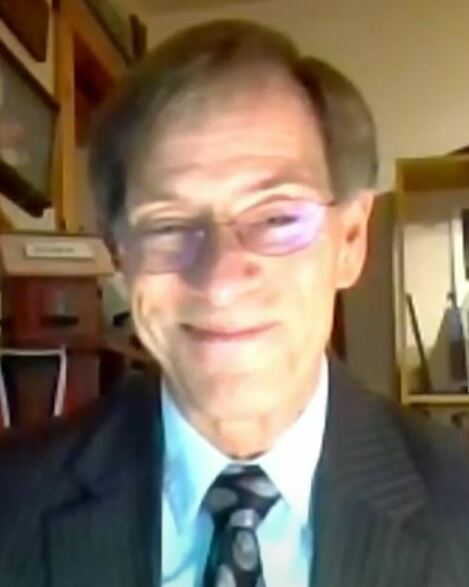

Nominee	Wendy Harrison	Nader Hashim
Party	Democratic	Democratic
Popular vote	13,473	11,735
Percentage	35.6%	31.0%
Nominee	Richard Morton	Dale Gassett
Party	Republican	Republican
Popular vote	5,574	5,213
Percentage	14.7%	13.8%
Senators before election
Wendy Harrison (Dem)
Nader Hashim (Dem)
Elected Senators
Wendy Harrison (Dem)
Nader Hashim (Dem)

- Elects two senators.

The incumbents are Democrats Wendy Harrison and Nader Hashim, who won with 34.2% and 31.2% of the vote in 2022, respectively (65.6% combined).

=== Democratic primary ===
==== Declared ====
- Wendy Harrison, incumbent senator
- Nader Hashim, incumbent senator

==== Results ====
Windham Senate district Democratic primary election, 2024
Party	Candidate	Votes	%
Democratic	Wendy Harrison (incumbent)	3,950	50.53
Democratic	Nader Hashim (incumbent)	3,791	48.50
Write-in		68	0.87
Total votes		7,817	100.0

=== Republican primary ===
==== Declared ====
- Dale Gassett, chair of the Windham County Republican Party
- Richard Morton, former chair of the Windham County Republican Party, perennial candidate, and nominee for this district in 2022

==== Results ====
Windham Senate district Republican primary election, 2024
Party	Candidate	Votes	%
Republican	Richard Morton	622	52.05
Republican	Dale Gassett	556	46.53
Write-in		17	1.42
Total votes		1,195	100.0

=== Independents ===
==== Declared ====
- Ken Fay, former Westminster Town Manager

=== General election ===
==== Results ====
Windham Senate district general election, 2024
Party	Candidate	Votes	%
Democratic	Wendy Harrison (incumbent)	13,473	35.6%
Democratic	Nader Hashim (incumbent)	11,735	31%
Republican	Richard Morton	5,574	14.7%
Republican	Dale Gassett	5,213	13.8%
Independent	Ken Fay	1,742	4.6%
Write-in		65	0.2%
Total votes		37,802	100.0

== Windsor ==
2024 Vermont Senate Windsor district election
- November 5, 2024
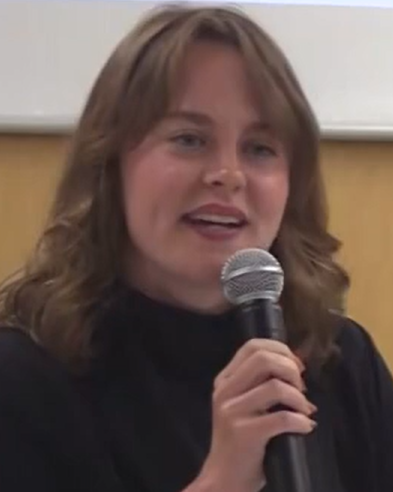

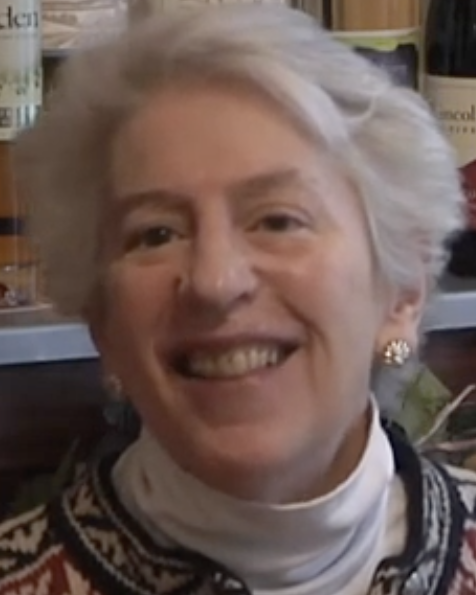

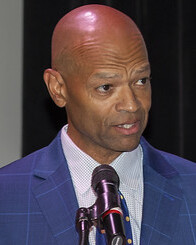

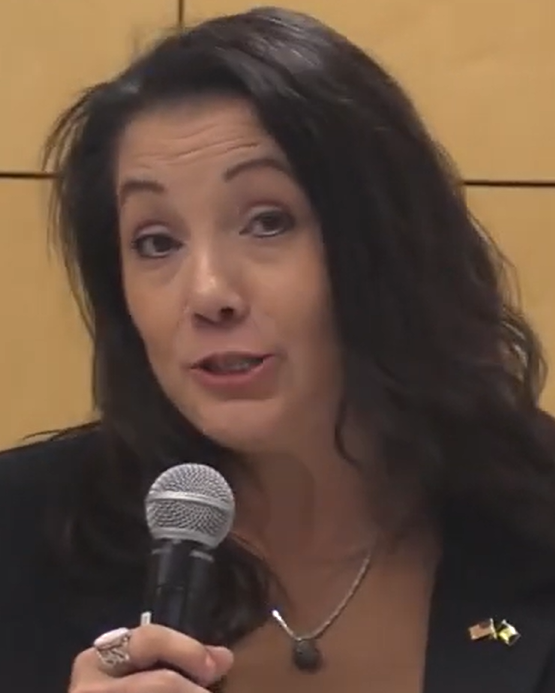

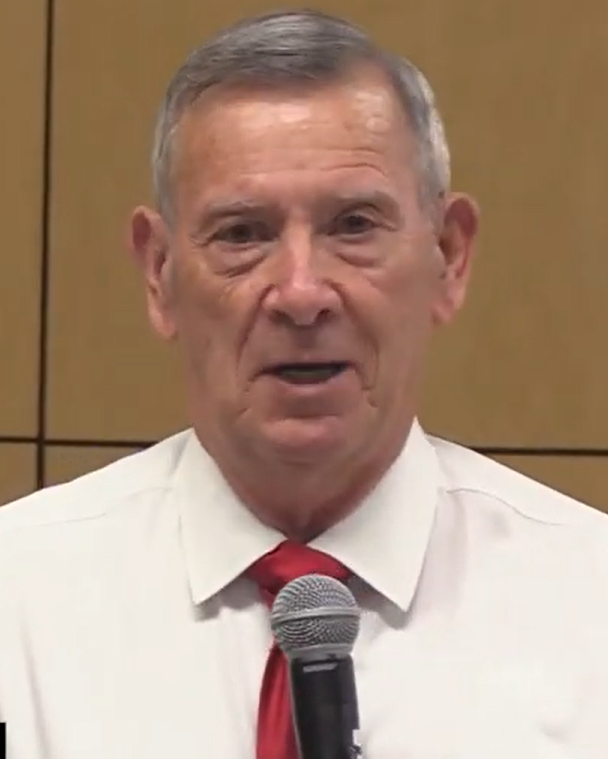

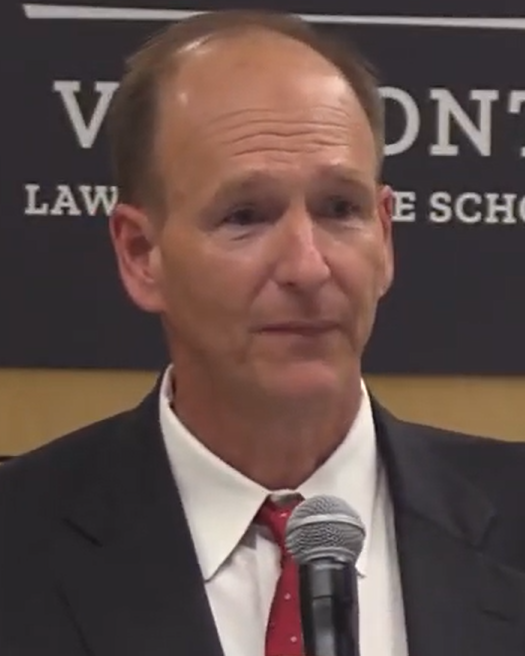
Nominee	Rebecca White	Alison Clarkson	Joe Major
Party	Democratic	Democratic	Democratic
Popular vote	17,930	17,864	16,792
Percentage	20.0%	20.0%	18.8%
Nominee	Andrea Murray	Jack Williams	Jonathan Gleason
Party	Republican	Republican	Republican
Popular vote	12,318	10,844	10,720
Percentage	13.8%	12.1%	12.0%
Senators before election
Alison Clarkson (Dem)
Richard McCormack (Dem)
Rebecca White (Dem)
Elected Senators
Alison Clarkson (Dem)
Joe Major (Dem)
Rebecca White (Dem)

- Elects three senators.

The incumbents are Democrats Alison Clarkson, Rebecca White, and Richard McCormack, who won with 23.4%, 22.9%, and 22.7% of the vote in 2022, respectively (69.0% combined). McCormack is not running for re-election.

=== Democratic primary ===
==== Declared ====
- Alison Clarkson, incumbent senator
- Joe Major, Hartford Town Treasurer
- Justin Tuthill, cook and Republican candidate for U.S. House in 2020
- Rebecca White, incumbent senator

==== Withdrawn ====
- Marc Nemeth, attorney (remained on ballot, running as an independent)

==== Declined ====
- Richard McCormack, incumbent senator

==== Results ====
Windsor Senate district Democratic primary election, 2024
Party	Candidate	Votes	%
Democratic	Rebecca White (incumbent)	4,226	31.58
Democratic	Alison Clarkson (incumbent)	4,127	30.84
Democratic	Joe Major	3,268	24.42
Democratic	Justin Tuthill	877	6.55
Democratic	Marc Nemeth (withdrawn)	816	6.10
Write-in		74	0.55
Total votes		13,384	100.0

=== Republican primary ===
==== Declared ====
- Jonathan Gleason, ski instructor
- Andrea Murray, member of the Weathersfield Zoning Board of Adjustments
- Robert Ruhlin, construction company owner
- Jack Williams, retired quality assurance professional and nominee for this district in 2016, 2018, and 2020

==== Endorsements ====
Andrea Murray

Statewide officials

- Jim Douglas, former Governor of Vermont

==== Results ====
Windsor Senate district Republican primary election, 2024
Party	Candidate	Votes	%
Republican	Jack Williams	1,342	27.23
Republican	Andrea Murray	1,337	27.13
Republican	Jonathan Gleason	1,136	23.05
Republican	Robert Ruhlin	1,036	21.02
Write-in		78	1.58
Total votes		4,929	100.0

=== Independents ===
==== Declared ====
- Marc Nemeth, attorney

=== General election ===
==== Results ====
Windsor Senate district general election, 2024
Party	Candidate	Votes	%
Democratic	Rebecca White (incumbent)	17,930	20%
Democratic	Alison Clarkson (incumbent)	17,864	20%
Democratic	Joe Major	16,792	18.8%
Republican	Andrea Murray	12,318	13.8%
Republican	Jack Williams	10,844	12.1%
Republican	Jonathan Gleason	10,720	12%
Independent	Marc Nemeth	2,903	3.2%
Write-in		118	0.1%
Total votes		89,489	100.0

== See also ==
- 2024 Vermont elections
- 2024 United States elections
- 2024 United States Senate election in Vermont
- 2024 United States House of Representatives election in Vermont
- 2024 Vermont gubernatorial election
- 2024 Vermont lieutenant gubernatorial election
- 2024 Vermont House of Representatives election
