= 2026 Vermont Proposal 3 =

- November 3, 2026
- Right to Collective Bargaining Amendment

Results
Choice	Votes	%
Yes	230,396	78.60%
No	62,737	21.40%
Total votes	293,133	100.00%

Vermont Proposal 3, officially the Right to Collective Bargaining Amendment, is a legislatively referred constitutional amendment that appeared on the ballot in the U.S. state of Vermont on November 3, 2026, concurrent with the 2026 United States elections.

== Background ==
Vermont does not currently have a constitutional right providing workers with the right to join labor organizations. Constitutional amendments in Vermont must pass the Vermont General Assembly in two consecutive legislative sessions. In April 2024, it passed the Vermont Senate unanimously, and the Vermont House of Representatives passed it with a bipartisan vote.

In March 2025, the amendment again passed the Senate unanimously. It then passed the House for the final time in May, placing it on the 2026 ballot.

In November 2026, the amendment was overwhelmingly approved by nearly 75% of voters.

== Impact ==
The proposal will amend the Constitution of Vermont to state that employees have a constitutional right to organize and join labor organizations for collective bargaining with their employer. It will also ban right-to-work laws, as a consequence of prohibiting any laws that would interfere with the amendment.

== Endorsements ==
Yes

Statewide officials

- Mike Pieciak, state treasurer of Vermont (2023–present) (Democratic)
- David Zuckerman, former lieutenant governor of Vermont (2017–2021, 2023–2025) (Progressive)

State legislators

- Philip Baruth, president pro tempore of the Vermont Senate (2023–present) from Chittenden-Central (2011–present) (Democratic)
- Nader Hashim, state senator from Windham County (2023–present) (Democratic)
- Wendy Harrison, state senator from Windham County (2023–present) (Democratic)
- Kesha Ram Hinsdale, majority leader of the Vermont Senate (2025–present) from Chittenden-Southeast (2023–present) (Note: Formerly Chittenden (2021–2023)) (Democratic)
- Lori Houghton, majority leader of the Vermont House of Representatives (2025–present) from the Chittenden 8-2 district (2017–present) (Democratic)
- Emilie Krasnow, state representative from the Chittenden 9 district (2023–present) (Democratic)
- Jill Krowinski, speaker of the Vermont House of Representatives (2021–present) from the Chittenden 16 district (2023–present) (Note: Formerly Chittenden 3-3 (2012–2013) and Chittenden 6-3 (2013–2023)) (Democratic)

Political parties

- Vermont Democratic Party

Labor unions

- National Fraternal Order of Police
- Vermont Fraternal Order of Police
- Vermont AFL-CIO
No

Party officials

- Rob Roper, former Vermont Republican Party chair

== Polling ==
Poll source	Date(s) administered	Sample size (Note: Key: A – all adults RV – registered voters LV – likely voters V – unclear)	Margin of error	Yes	No	Undecided
University of New Hampshire	September 17–21, 2026	829 (LV)	± 3.3%	65%	22%	13%
