= Thomas Koch =

Thomas Koch may refer to:

- Thomas Koch (ice hockey) (born 1983), Austrian ice hockey player
- Thomas F. Koch (born 1942), American politician who currently serves in the Vermont House of Representatives
- Thomaz Koch (born 1945), Brazilian tennis player
- Thomas P. Koch (born 1963), mayor of Quincy, Massachusetts
