= Tanya Vyhovsky =

American politician from Vermont

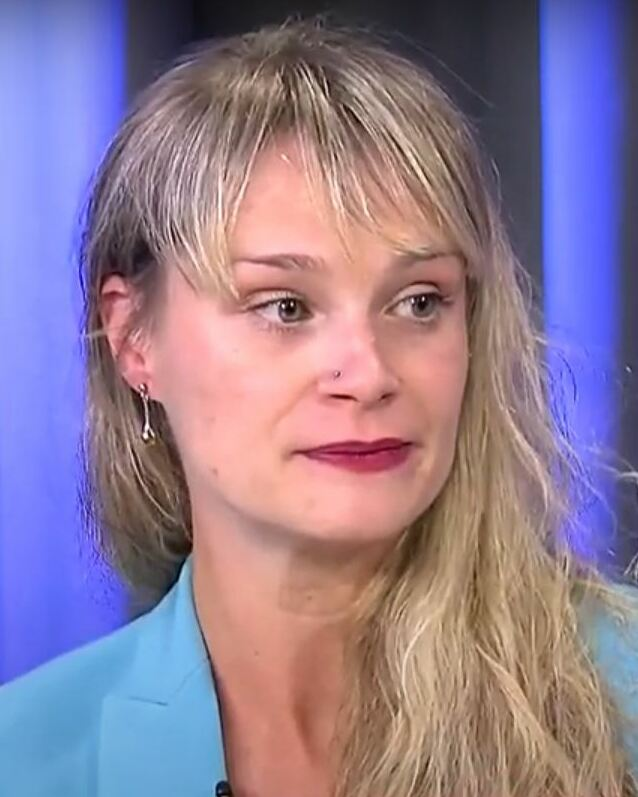
- Vyhovsky in 2022

Member of the Vermont Senate from the Chittenden-Central district
- Incumbent
- Assumed office January 4, 2023 Serving with Philip Baruth and Martine Gulick
- Preceded by: Christopher Pearson

Member of the Vermont House of Representatives from the Chittenden-8-1 district
- In office January 6, 2021 – January 3, 2023 Serving with Marybeth Redmond (2019–2021); Rey Garofano (2022–2023)
- Preceded by: Linda Myers
- Succeeded by: Leonora Dodge

Personal details
- Party: Progressive
- Spouse: Jefferson Hales (m. 2015)
- Education: Northeastern University (BS); University of Vermont (MSW)

Tanya C. Vyhovsky is an American politician and social worker who has served in the Vermont Senate representing the Chittenden-Central district since January 2023. A member of the Vermont Progressive Party, she previously represented the Chittenden-8-1 district in the Vermont House of Representatives.

== Early life and education ==
Tanya Vyhovsky graduated from Essex High School in 2003. She graduated from Northeastern University with a Bachelor of Science in psychology and biology. She graduated from the University of Vermont with a master of social work degree in 2017. She married Jefferson Hales in 2015. She is of Ukrainian descent.

== Career ==
Vyhovsky worked as a clinical social worker and school social worker in Essex, Vermont. She served on the board and was vice-president of the Vermont National Association of Social Workers from 2016 to 2020. Vyhovsky was endorsed by the Champlain Valley DSA chapter in her 2020 run.

=== Vermont House of Representatives ===
Vyhovsky ran for a seat in the Vermont House of Representatives and won the Progressive and Democratic nominations alongside Marybeth Redmond, but placed third out of three candidates behind Redmond and Linda K. Myers in the 2018 election.

Vyhovsky announced at an event held by Bernie Sanders that she would run for a seat in the state house again and during the campaign she was endorsed by Sanders. She won the Democratic nomination alongside Redmond and placed second out of five candidates in the 2020 election.

=== Vermont Senate ===
In 2022, Vyhovsky was a candidate for the Vermont Senate from the three-member Chittenden-Central District. She placed second in the Democratic primary and was elected in the general election alongside Philip Baruth and Martine Gulick.

== Electoral history ==
2018 Vermont House of Representatives Chittenden-6-4 district election
Primary election
Party	Candidate	Votes	%
Democratic	Marybeth Redmond	632	55.88%
Democratic	Tanya Vyhovsky	496	43.85%
Write-in		3	0.27%
Total votes		1,131	100.00%
	Blank	440	
	Spoiled	1	
General election
Democratic	Marybeth Redmond	2,485	40.78%
Republican	Linda K. Myers (incumbent)	1,994	32.73%
Progressive	Tanya Vyhovsky		
Democratic	Tanya Vyhovsky		
Total	Tanya Vyhovsky	1,600	26.26%
Write-in		14	0.23%
Total votes		6,093	100.00%
	Blank	2,175	
	Spoiled	2	

2020 Vermont House of Representatives Chittenden-6-4 district election
Primary election
Party	Candidate	Votes	%
Democratic	Marybeth Redmond (incumbent)	1,359	48.57%
Democratic	Tanya Vyhovsky	762	27.23%
Democratic	Brian Shelden	666	23.80%
Write-in		11	0.39%
Total votes		2,798	100.00%
	Blank	622	
General election
Democratic	Marybeth Redmond (incumbent)	3,234	34.19%
Progressive	Tanya Vyhovsky		
Democratic	Tanya Vyhovsky		
Total	Tanya Vyhovsky	2,273	24.03%
Republican	Thomas M. Nelson	1,840	19.45%
Republican	Maryse B. Dunbar	1,793	18.96%
Libertarian	V. Chase	302	3.19%
Write-in		17	0.18%
Total votes		9,459	100.00%
	Blank	2,001	

2022 Vermont Senate Chittenden-Central district election
Primary election
Party	Candidate	Votes	%
Democratic	Philip Baruth (incumbent)	5,710	23.71%
Democratic	Tanya Vyhovsky	5,140	21.34%
Democratic	Martine Gulick	3,949	16.40%
Democratic	Erhard Mahnke	3,947	16.39%
Democratic	Dawn Ellis	3,329	13.82%
Democratic	Andrew Brown	1,941	8.06%
Write-in		70	0.29%
Total votes		24,086	100.00%
	Blank	7,432	
	Spoiled	27	
General election
Democratic	Philip Baruth (incumbent)		
Progressive	Philip Baruth (incumbent)		
Total	Philip Baruth (incumbent)	15,189	31.98%
Democratic	Martine Gulick	14,007	29.49%
Democratic	Tanya Vyhovsky		
Progressive	Tanya Vyhovsky		
Total	Tanya Vyhovsky	12,378	26.06%
Independent	Infinite Culcleasure	5,327	11.21%
Write-in		600	1.26%
Total votes		47,501	100.00%
	Blank	24,169	
	Spoiled	15	

== See also ==
- List of Democratic Socialists of America who have held office in the United States
