= Senator Major =

Senator Major may refer to:

- Joe Major (born 1965), Vermont State Senate
- Samuel C. Major (1869–1931), Missouri State Senate

== See also ==
- Thomas Jefferson Majors (1841–1932), Nebraska State Senate
