= Joe Major =

American politician (born January 20,1965)

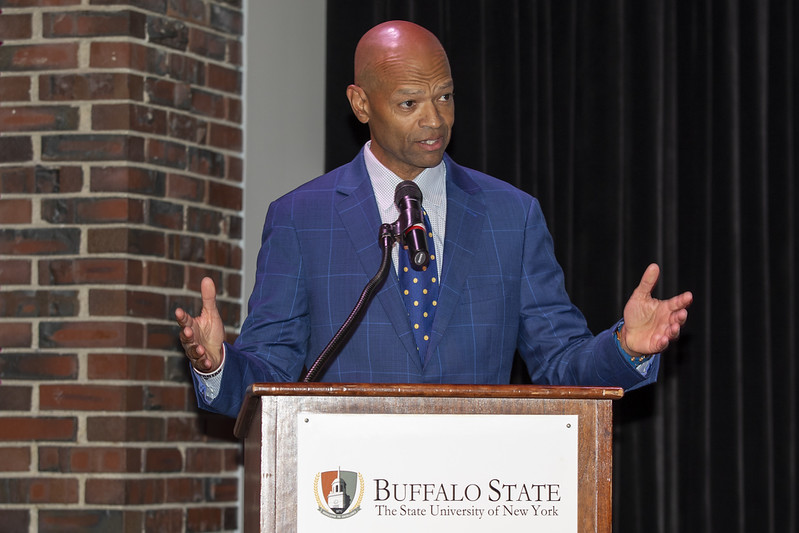
- Major in 2019

Member of the Vermont Senate from the Windsor district
- Incumbent
- Assumed office January 8, 2025 Serving with Alison H. Clarkson, Rebecca White
- Preceded by: Richard McCormack

Personal details
- Born: Joseph Dwayne Major Sr. 1964 or 1965 (age 61–62) Buffalo, New York
- Party: Democratic Party
- Education: Howard University (BA)
- Website: https://www.joemajorvt.com/

Joseph Dwayne Major Sr. (born January 20, 1965) is an American politician who is currently serving as a Democratic member of the Vermont Senate from the Windsor district. He was first elected in 2024, succeeding incumbent Richard McCormack.

== Personal life and career ==
Major was born in Buffalo, New York, and graduated from Howard University with a BA. He currently lives in Hartford and previously served as the town's treasurer. He simultaneously serves as a state senator and for the Upper Valley Aquatic Center as executive director.
