= Kim Gleason =

American politician

Member-elect of the Vermont Senate from the Grand Isle district
- Assuming office January 2027
- Succeeding: Patrick Brennan

Personal details
- Party: Democratic

Kim Gleason is an American politician. A member of the Democratic Party, she is the member-elect for the Grand Isle district of the Vermont Senate.
