= Andy Julow =

American politician

Member of the Vermont Senate from the Grand Isle district
- In office May 2024 – January 8, 2025
- Preceded by: Richard Mazza
- Succeeded by: Patrick Brennan

Personal details
- Party: Democratic

Andy Julow is an American politician. He served as a Democratic member for the Grand Isle district of the Vermont Senate.
