= Chittenden-Central (Vermont Senate district) =

The Chittenden-Central Vermont Senate District is one of 16 Vermont Senate districts. Chittenden-Central elects three members at-large. It was developed in redistricting after the 2022 census, when legislators decided to create multiple districts out the existing Chittenden district, which elected six members at-large.

Chittenden-Central includes Burlington's New and Old North Ends, the city of Winooski, a portion of Colchester, the city of Essex Junction, and part of the town of Essex.

In 2022 and 2024, the three senators elected from Chittenden-Central were Philip Baruth, Martine Gulick, and Tanya Vyhovsky.
