= Joseph Mazza =

American politician

Joseph Mazza Sr.

Member of the Vermont House of Representatives from the Colchester district
- In office 1961–1973
- Succeeded by: Richard Mazza

Personal details
- Born: Joseph Michael Mazza; May 8, 1905 Mineville, New York, U.S.
- Died: July 18, 1993 (aged 88) Burlington, Vermont, U.S.
- Party: Democratic
- Spouse: Mary Perrino (m. 1926)

Joseph Michael Mazza Sr. (May 8, 1905 – July 18, 1993) was an American politician who served 12 years in the Vermont House of Representatives. He was succeeded by his son, Richard.
