= Stewart Ledbetter =

Stewart Ledbetter is an American journalist. From 2007 to 2023, he hosted the weekly news roundtable program Vermont This Week.

In 2015, he was inducted into the Vermont Association of Broadcasters' Hall of Fame.

He retired in February 2024.

In May 2024, he announced his candidacy for the Democratic nomination for the Chittenden-Central District in the Vermont State Senate.
