= Anne Watson =

American teacher and politician

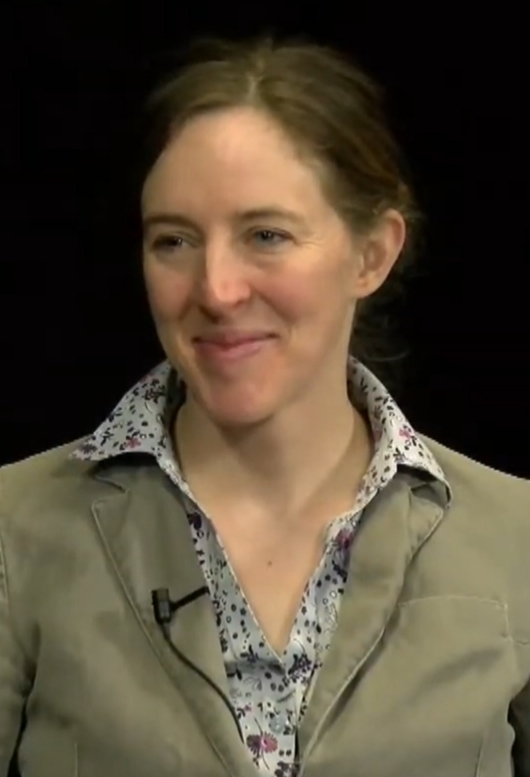
- Watson in 2020

Member of the Vermont Senate from the Washington district
- Incumbent
- Assumed office January 4, 2023 Serving with Ann Cummings, Andrew Perchlik
- Preceded by: Anthony Pollina

Mayor of Montpelier
- In office March 7, 2018 – December 21, 2022
- Preceded by: John Hollar
- Succeeded by: Jack McCullough

Personal details
- Born: 1980 (age 45–46) Burlington, Vermont, U.S.
- Party: Democratic
- Other political affiliations: Progressive
- Education: Pennsylvania State University, University Park (BA); University of Vermont (MA)

Anne Watson (born 1980) is an American educator and politician who has served as a Democratic / Progressive member of the Vermont Senate since January 2023. She served as Mayor of Montpelier, Vermont, from March 2018 to March 2023. Watson is a physics teacher at Montpelier High School. She served on the Montpelier city council for several years before running unopposed for mayor in late 2017.

In 2010, Watson launched an eventually successful campaign with the Vermont Youth Ultimate League to recognize Ultimate Frisbee as an official varsity-level sport in Vermont's high schools.

In April 2018, Watson was named in a blog article on the REI website as one of "five of the coolest mountain-city mayors" in the United States.

In November 2018, Watson was named to Vermont Business Magazine’s rising star “40 under 40 list.”

== Biography ==
Anne Elizabeth Watson was born in Burlington, Vermont and raised in nearby Essex. She is a 1999 graduate of Essex High School. She received her bachelor's degree in mathematics, with a minor in physics, from Penn State University in 2003. Watson next enrolled at the University of Vermont, where she completed a one-year master's degree in secondary education with a specialty in science.

=== Teacher ===
Watson joined the faculty of Montpelier High School as a physics teacher in 2004.

Watson having completed 5 years fellowship became a Senior Fellow at the Knowles Teacher Initiative. In 2010 she received certification from the National Board of Professional Teaching Standards and became one of the 118,000 certified teachers in America. 3.3% of American teachers are board certified.

In 2015, Watson appeared before the State Education Committee to advocate for a plan in which students from China would spend a year in Montpelier, attending the local high school. She proposed that the students would be housed in the dormitories of the Vermont College of Fine Arts. She received a Rowland Foundation Fellowship to further work on this proposal.

=== Coach and sports activist ===
Watson coaches Ultimate (once known as Ultimate Frisbee). Under her coaching, the Men's Ultimate team advanced to the Vermont finals five times from 2010 to 2017.

In 2010, Watson launched a campaign with the Vermont Youth Ultimate League to recognize Ultimate as an official varsity-level sport in Vermont's high schools. Watson, who had played Ultimate in college and coaches the sport at Montpelier High School, led a seven year state lobbying effort on behalf of the sport. Her efforts proved successful on November 3, 2017, when the Vermont Principals Association, which supervises the state's high school sports programs, unanimously approved Ultimate as a full varsity sport, beginning in the Spring 2019 season. The approval made Vermont the first state in the country to recognize Ultimate as a varsity sport. The approval ensures that players are not charged to participate, and that coaches are paid and provided with safety training.

Watson has been widely credited with Ultimate's landmark varsity recognition through her campaign.

=== Political career ===
Watson entered politics in 2012 when she was appointed to the vacant District 2 seat on the Montpelier City Council. She served three terms on the city council from 2012 until she left office to become mayor in 2018.

On November 2, 2017, three-term incumbent Montpelier Mayor John Hollar announced that he would not seek re-election to a fourth term in the March 2018 mayoral election. Watson, who was serving as President of the Montpelier City Council, announced her candidacy on November 6.

Watson campaigned on a platform with a focus on finances, infrastructure, the environment, and development. "Montpelier is a place where we have twice as many jobs as residents, and that's not even adjusting for job-age residents,” Watson says. “Many more people commute here to work than live here, and if we can make it more affordable and accessible for people to live here, it’ll help reduce carbon emissions. If we can enhance recreational options so they don't have to drive far to get to them, that will also help." Watson was elected on March 6, 2018.

== Publications ==
- Watson, Anne (April–May 2007). "Asking Authentic Questions with Tangible Consequences". The Science Teacher. 74 (4). Archived from the original on 2015-10-12 – via Questia.
- Toolin, Regina; Watson, Anne (April–May 2010). "Students for Sustainable Energy". The Science Teacher. 77 (4): 27–31.
- Toolin, Regina; Watson, Anne (8 July 2010). "Conducting Sustainable Energy Projects in Secondary Science Classrooms". Science Activities. 47 (2): 47–53. doi:10.1080/00368120903383158. S2CID 144794050.

== Works cited ==
- "Watson takes over as Montpelier mayor". WCAX. March 16, 2018.

Political offices
Preceded by John Hollar	Mayor of Montpelier; 2018–2022	Succeeded by Jack McCullough
