= Essex High School (Vermont) =

Location
- 2 Educational Drive; Essex Junction, Vermont 05452; United States
- 44°29′50″N 73°06′30″W

Information
- Type: Public secondary
- Established: 1957
- School board: Essex Westford School District Board
- School district: Essex Westford School District
- Principal: Donald Van Nostrand
- Staff: 111.75 (FTE)
- Grades: Ninth–twelfth grade
- Student to teacher ratio: 11.01
- Campus type: Suburban
- Colours: Blue and gold
- Mascot: Buzz the Hornet
- Team name: Hornets
- Feeder schools: Town of Essex: Essex Middle School (6–8); Village of Essex Junction: Albert D. Lawton Intermediate School (6–8); Town of Westford: Westford School (preK–8)
- SAT (average): 1260
- ACT (average): 28
- Phone: (802) 879-7121
- Website: ewsd.org/o/ehs

Essex High School (EHS) is a public secondary school located in Essex Junction, Vermont. The school's sports team is the Hornets, and the school's colors are blue and gold. Essex High School is the second largest high school after CVU and is the largest secondary technical school in Vermont. Enrollment in 2021 was 1,251. It is ranked #2,174 among all high schools nationwide as of 2026.

== History ==
The school was established in 1957 as Essex Junction High School. In 1970, a new, larger campus was constructed about 1 mile (1.6 km) away, containing both the high school and a technical center. This new campus was named the Essex Junction Educational Center (EJEC), while the former building became Albert D. Lawton Middle School. In the 1990s, the school's name was changed to Essex High School to reflect the two communities it served, Essex and Essex Junction.

The original EJHS building was designed for future expansion by the addition of a second story. However, when more classrooms were needed in the 1980s, new building codes required any renovations to bring the entire old building up to code, at great cost. A new two-story "C wing" and senior courtyard were added to the east side instead. In 2002, a new library and media center were built east of the C wing. As of 2026, the library contains an A/V lab, a maker-space, a computer lab, two classrooms, and two conference rooms.

Like many other schools in the state (namely, Burlington High School) EHS currently faces risk of being shut down due to having polychlorinated biphenyl (PCB) levels above Vermont's screening standard. EHS could be forced to rebuild its school in an entirely new location.

== Academics ==
The school is accredited as a public secondary school by the New England Association of Schools and Colleges and by the Vermont Department of Education. EHS adjoins the Center for Technology, Essex, a technical and vocational school. The Center for Technology, Essex is one of the best ranked Technology centers in the state. The Center was visited by Education Secretary Linda McMahon in June of 2026, Prompting a small protest. Essex Students can enroll concurrently in both high school and technical programs; approximately ten percent of students do so each year.

The school has accelerated programs in Mathematics, Science, Social Studies, English, French and Spanish; honors courses in English and Mathematics; and a selection of seventeen Advanced Placement courses. However, the school has repeatedly attempted to remove the Advanced Placement courses from its curriculum. The school also offers media and computer facilities.

In 2008, EHS students earned the county's best math scores on the New England Common Assessment Program test. By 2021, however, the proficiency levels had significantly decreased; across all standardized testing, EHS ranked in the bottom 10% of the state in average math and ELA scores.

Tuition was $18,000 in 2021-2022. This tuition was paid by towns sending students to this public school, sometimes from outside the school district.

== Student activities ==
There are 31 clubs and 18 sports including:

- The Essex High School Robotics club competes in FIRST Tech Challenge and progressed to the internationals in St. Louis in 2012.
- The We The People: The Citizen and the Constitution team won the state championship seven times since 2004 and was ranked nationally for five years. The EHS team for this competition disbanded after 2011.
- In 2005, the programming team won the regional title and was ranked fourth nationally, and ranked third in 1981.
- The Envirothon team won the state competition in 2007, 2009, and 2010.
- The Scholar's Bowl Team won the state championship in 2021, 2018, 2017, 2015, 2014, 2013, 2010, and 2004.

=== Athletics ===
The school has a stadium, track, tennis courts, and several practice fields. The town's indoor hockey rink is located on school grounds. School teams and student athletes have won over 200 Vermont State Championships since 1970. This figure includes 63 individual track records set by various girl and boy athletes.

- The girls' cross country team has won 18 state championships, and won New England's in 1986, 1987, and 1994. Since 1948, the boys' cross-country teams have won 16 titles, including a New England's crown in 1987, and won five consecutive titles from 2000-2004. Most recently the boys cross country team were state champions in 2018 and the Boys track team won states in 2018 This run culminated in a 4th-place finish at the New England championships in 2004. Essex's boys' and girls' teams have won a total of 36 state titles since 1973.
- The boys' hockey team won its first Vermont state championship in 1981, and has won it fifteen times since.
- In the 2003-2004 season, the hockey team went undefeated, winning 23 straight games and the Vermont state title.
- In 2006, Bill O'Neil was named national boys' hockey coach of the year.
- The football team has won the state title seven times - 1973, 1981, 1988, 1989, 1992, 2009, and 2021.
- The cheerleading team has captured the most state championships by any cheerleading team in Vermont, winning a total of 21 state titles since 1986. In 2005, after taking first place at the New England Regional Qualifier, the team traveled to Orlando, Florida, where they placed third out of thirty-one teams in the most competitive national cheerleading competition in the country: the UCA National Cheerleading Championship. They marked VT Cheerleading history as the first team in the state to compete nationally. The team's most recent state titles were claimed in 2008, 2011, 2012, and 2014.
- The boys' lacrosse team won the state title in 2007, 2008, and 2010.
- The boys' tennis team won the state title in 1982, 1995, 2011, and 2018.
- The boys' basketball team won its first state title in 1979, and won again in 1998 and 2010.
- The boys' rugby team has won four of the last five state championships.
- The girls' basketball team has won the state title nine times - 1979, 1986, 1990, 1994, 1995, 1996, 1997, 1998, and 2006.
- The co-ed bowling team won the state title in the 2014-15 season.

== Controversies ==
- In 2022, an English teacher was placed on indefinite leave after being caught on video repeatedly stating the N-word.
- In 2021, Essex High School was reprimanded after several students shouted racial slurs against an opposing team during an American football match.
- In 2017, the Essex High School choir teacher at the time voluntarily "surrendered his teaching license" on grounds that he was "alleged to have engaged in inappropriate conduct with a student."
- On April 12, 2017, Essex High School received a threat from an individual claiming that he intended to harm EHS students with weapons and explosives. However, the incident turned out to be an incident of a swatting event. Two juveniles, including one 14-year-old Vermont boy, were eventually charged in connection to the incident; controversially, the Vermont boy was allowed to return as an EHS student after a period of time.
- In 2019, Essex High School faced backlash over their handling of a chalk drawing of Pepe the Frog in front of the school. While the Essex High School administration insisted that the drawing was used in a hate-related context, the drawer insisted that the entire ordeal was a "misunderstanding."

== Notable faculty ==
- Linda K. Myers, member of the Vermont House of Representatives, former cheerleading coach at Essex High School

== Notable alumni ==
- Brian Dubie, 1977, former Lieutenant Governor of Vermont
- Michael Dubie, 1978, former Adjutant General of Vermont
- Carissa Gump, 2001, Athlete, 2008 Olympian-Weightlifting
- Shane Lavalette, 2005, photographer, publisher and editor of Lavalette, and director of Light Work
- Loung Ung, 1989, Cambodian American author and human-rights activist
- Anne Watson, 1999, Vermont state senator and former mayor of Montpelier
