= Richard Mazza =

American businessman and politician (1939–2024)

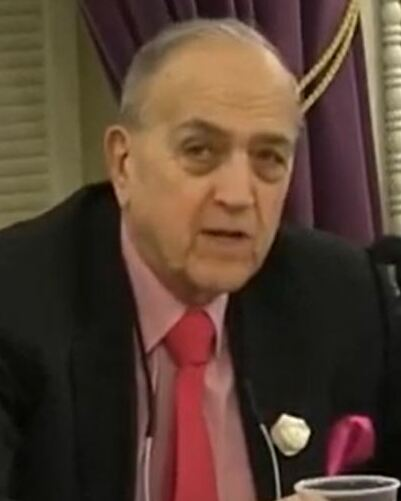
- Mazza in 2019

Member of the Vermont Senate from the Grand Isle district
- In office January 9, 1985 – April 8, 2024
- Preceded by: George Coy
- Succeeded by: Andy Julow

Member of the Vermont House of Representatives from the 14-3 district
- In office January 3, 1973 – January 4, 1977
- Preceded by: Joseph Mazza
- Succeeded by: Theresa Feeley

Personal details
- Born: Richard Thomas Mazza; September 4, 1939 Colchester, Vermont, U.S.
- Died: May 25, 2024 (aged 84) Colchester, Vermont, U.S.
- Party: Democratic
- Spouse: Dorothy Darling Hinds
- Children: 2

Richard Thomas Mazza (September 4, 1939 – May 25, 2024) was an American businessman and politician from Vermont. A Democrat, he served as a member of the Vermont Senate from 1985 until 2024, making him the body's dean, or longest-serving member. Mazza represented the Chittenden-Grand Isle district, which includes the town of Colchester in Chittenden County and all of Grand Isle County.

== Early life and career ==
Mazza was born on September 4, 1939, and was a lifelong resident of Colchester. He was educated in the public schools of Colchester and graduated from Winooski High School.

Mazza was the owner and operator of Dick Mazza's General Store in Colchester. His civic memberships included being a member of the Champlain Valley Fair board of directors and president of the Colchester Senior Citizens Housing Project.

== Political career ==
Mazza served in the Vermont House of Representatives from 1973 to 1977, succeeding his father Joseph, and was a member of the Transportation Committee and the Legislative Council Committee.

In 1984, Mazza was elected to the Vermont Senate. He was reelected every two years through 2022, and served continuously from 1985 until his 2024 resignation. From 1991 until 2024, he served on the Transportation Committee, including terms as chairman. He also served on the Institutions Committee from 1991 until 2024, including terms as vice chairman.

Mazza was a member of the legislature's Joint Transportation Oversight Committee, including terms as chairman. From 1997 until 2024, he was the third member of the Senate's Committee on Committees. The Committee on Committees includes the lieutenant governor, senate president, and a third member chosen by the full senate, and is responsible for committee assignments and assignment of chairpersons, vice chairpersons, and clerks.

On April 8, 2024, Mazza announced his resignation from office, to take effect the same day, citing health concerns as the reason for his departure. He had been diagnosed with pancreatic cancer the year prior.

== Personal life ==
Mazza was married to the former Dorothy D. Hinds. They were the parents of one son and one daughter, and the grandparents of four.

Mazza died of pancreatic cancer on May 25, 2024, at the age of 84.
