= Philip Baruth =

American politician from Vermont

Phil Baruth
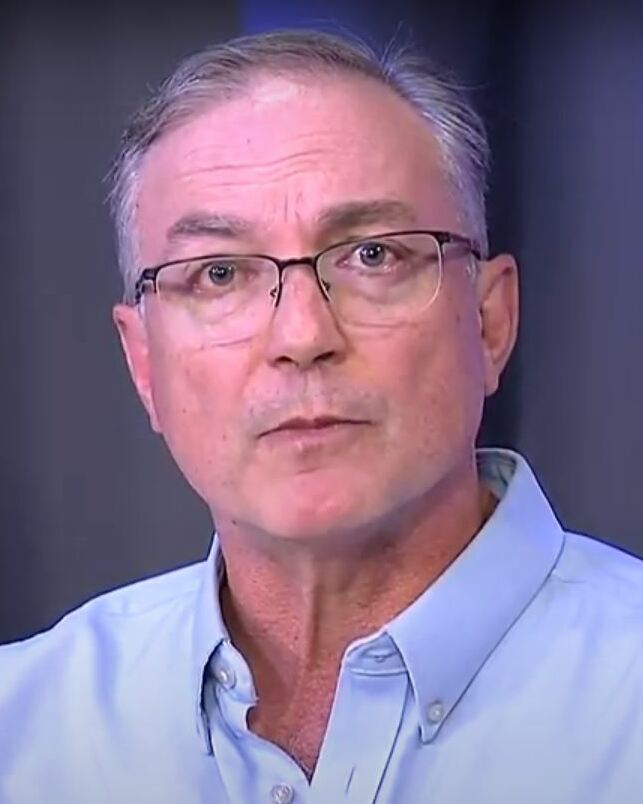
- Baruth in 2022

83rd President pro tempore of the Vermont Senate
- Incumbent
- Assumed office January 4, 2023
- Preceded by: Becca Balint

Majority Leader of the Vermont Senate
- In office January 2, 2013 – January 6, 2017
- Preceded by: William Carris
- Succeeded by: Becca Balint

Member of the Vermont Senate
- Incumbent
- Assumed office January 5, 2011 Serving with Martine Gulick and Tanya Vyhovsky
- Constituency: Chittenden (2011–2023); Chittenden-Central (2023–Present)

Personal details
- Born: February 10, 1962 (age 64) Lockport, New York, U.S.
- Party: Democratic
- Other political affiliations: Vermont Progressive Party
- Education: Brown University (BA); University of California, Irvine (MA, PhD)

Philip E. Baruth (born February 10, 1962) is an American politician, novelist, biographer, professor, and former radio commentator from Vermont. A Democrat and member of the Vermont Progressive Party, he represents the Chittenden-Central Vermont Senate District in the Vermont Senate. He served as Majority Leader from 2013 to 2017, when he endorsed his successor, Becca Balint. He now serves as the senate president pro tempore.

== Education and teaching career ==
Baruth earned a B.A. in English from Brown University in 1984 and a Ph.D. from the University of California, Irvine, in 1993. He is Professor of English at the University of Vermont, where he has served on the faculty since 1993. His teaching is primarily in the areas of creative writing, postmodern American literature and culture, eighteenth-century British literature, and the literature of Vermont.

== Political career ==
First elected to the Vermont Senate in 2010, Baruth was re-elected in 2012, 2014, 2016, 2018, 2020, 2022, and 2024. He was elected Majority Leader of the Vermont Senate in 2013, and served until 2017. In January 2023, he was elected Vermont Senate President Pro Tempore.

From 2017 to 2020, Baruth served as Chair of the Senate Education Committee. He has previously served on the Judiciary, Appropriations, Education, Economic Development, and Agriculture Committees.

He has also served on the PreKindergarten-16 Council and the Vermont Child Poverty Council.

Baruth began his public service career as a member of the Burlington Board of School Commissioners. First elected in 2003, he served two non-consecutive two-year terms in Ward 4.

In the fall of 2005, Baruth launched a political blog, "The Vermont Daily Briefing." The blog was voted "Best Vermont Blog of 2006" for its first year of political coverage in the Seven Days "Best of Vermont" poll. It won "Best Political Blog" again in 2007, 2008, and 2010. The blog included daily political posts, in-depth interviews, humor, and satire. The blog continued until 2012.

Baruth's career in the State Senate is most noted for his advocacy of gun control. He first proposed an assault weapons ban in 2013 as Majority Leader and later supported a comprehensive background check bill in 2015. In 2018, following the Parkland mass shooting and a foiled plot at Fair Haven Union High School in Vermont, Baruth's Universal Background Checks language became the nucleus of a comprehensive gun safety bill S55, a bill then signed by Republican governor Phil Scott on the steps of the Vermont statehouse.

He was the driving force in the Senate behind the passage of the 2016 Paid Sick Leave bill, in recognition of which he was named Legislator of the Year by the Main Street Alliance of Vermont. On Education, he was one of the drafters of Act 77, which created Vermont's dual enrollment, early college, and personalized learning plan programs.

== Writing ==
Baruth is the author of four novels and more than a dozen published short stories, as well as screenplays, radio commentaries, and works of scholarship. His most recent novel, The Brothers Boswell, was included on the Washington Post list of "Best Books of 2009." It was also an Indie Next List Notable Book. The novel, a historical thriller, tells the story of the relationship between James Boswell (famous biographer of Samuel Johnson) and Boswell's younger brother John. In this fictionalized account, the envious younger brother pursues Boswell and Johnson with malicious intent. Baruth's novel The X President was a New York Times Notable Book of 2003. It is a time-travel narrative focused on the presidency of Bill Clinton (although the novel refers to the character always as BC).

Baruth is also a notable writer of short fiction. In 1994 he won the Black Warrior Review Annual Fiction Prize for his short story "Peaheart." Other stories have appeared in New England Review, Denver Quarterly, Carolina Quarterly, and TriQuarterly. "Peaheart" and other stories are now collected in American Zombie Beauty (Wolfson Press 2015).

For a number of summers Baruth has led intensive writing workshops in his role as Visiting Writer at the Bread Loaf New England Young Writers' Conference (1995–1997, 2000–2001, 2005–2006, 2010). He has also led workshops as a Visiting Writer at the Champlain College Vermont Young Writers' Conference since 2001.

Baruth's book-length biography of long-serving U.S. senator Patrick Leahy was published in 2017 by University Press of New England.

== Radio and television work ==
From 1998 to 2009, Baruth was a regular commentator for Vermont Public Radio. His series, "Notes from the New Vermont," focused on both national and Vermont issues. He won the 2009 Public Radio News Directors Award: First Place for "Birth Rate Blues," a satirical take on Vermont's low fertility statistics, in the nationwide Public Radio Commentary category. He also shared the 2009 Edward R. Murrow Award in the Overall Excellence category, for "Birth Rate Blues." In the 2003 Vermont Associated Press Awards, Baruth shared First Place in Radio and Television Commentary as part of Vermont Public Radio's "Great Thoughts" Series, celebrating Vermont ideas; and Third Place for "Howard Dean — Babe, If I May," a political satire on Dean's presidential campaign. In 2002 he won Second Place in the nationwide Public Radio Commentary category of the Public Radio News Directors Awards for "Lonesome Jim," a satire on Jim Jeffords' April 2001 defection from the Republican Party. In the same year, he shared First Place in Radio and Television Commentary in the Vermont Associated Press Broadcast Awards as part of Vermont Public Radio's coverage of the 9/11 terrorist attacks, and Second Place for "Lonesome Jim."

Baruth's other radio work has included host and scriptwriter for Camel's Hump Radio (2000–2003), a half-hour radio program produced by Vermont Public Radio and featuring interviews and narrated segments from classic and award-winning adventure stories. From 2006 to 2012 he provided weekly commentary on national and state politics for Air America (in Brattleboro)/WKVT-FM "Live & Local."

Several of his radio commentaries appear in the book he edited with Joe Citro, Vermont Air: The Best of the Vermont Public Radio Commentary Series (2002). He wrote the Introduction to And Now, Michiana Chronicles (South Bend IN: Wolfson Press, 2008), a collection of selected commentaries aired by WVPE (88.1 FM) in the Michigan/Indiana region.

From 2006 to 2009, Baruth appeared among the regular rotating panel of journalists and publishers on "Vermont This Week," a half-hour Sunday news show produced by Vermont Public Television. It is their signature public affairs segment analyzing the week's top political stories statewide.

== Bibliography ==
=== Novels ===
- The Millennium Shows (Albion Books 1994) (Republished by Kearney Street Books in 2012) ISBN 978-0-983-81801-4
- The Dream of the White Village (RNM Inc. 1998) ISBN 978-0-965-71442-6
- The X President (Bantam 2003) ISBN 978-0-553-80294-8
- The Brothers Boswell (Soho Press 2009) ISBN 978-1-569-47559-1

=== Story collections ===
- American Zombie Beauty (Wolfson Press 2015) ISBN 978-1-939-67406-7

=== Academic and non-fiction books ===
- Introducing Charlotte Charke: Actress, Author, Enigma, Editor (University of Illinois Press 1998) ISBN 978-0-252-06723-5
- Senator Leahy: A Life in Scenes (University Press of New England, 2017) ISBN 978-1-512-60056-8

=== Anthologies ===
- Vermont Air: The Best of the Vermont Public Radio Commentary Series, Co-edited with Joe Citro (University Press of New England 2002) ISBN 978-1-584-65176-5
- The Storyteller Speaks: Rare and Different Fictions of the Grateful Dead, Gary McKinney and Robert G. Weiner, eds. (Kearney Street Books 2010)
- The WRUV Reader: An Anthology of Vermont Writers, Chris Evans, ed. (2012), pp. 2–7.

Vermont Senate
Preceded by William Carris	Majority Leader of the Vermont Senate; 2013–2017	Succeeded by Becca Balint
Preceded by Becca Balint	President pro tempore of the Vermont Senate; 2023–present	Incumbent
