= Nader Hashim =

American politician

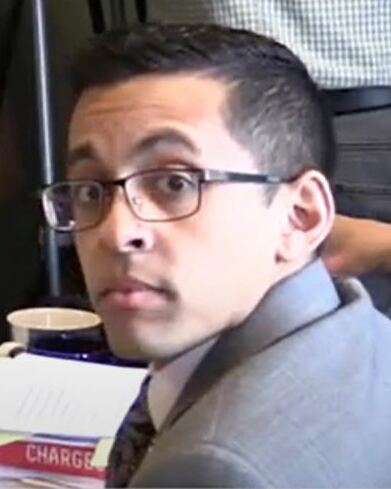

Member of the Vermont Senate from the Windham District
- Incumbent
- Assumed office January 4, 2023 Serving with Wendy Harrison

Personal details
- Born: Nader Hashim
- Party: Democratic
- Education: Clark University
- Website: Campaign website

Nader Hashim (born 1988) is an American politician from the state of Vermont. He has represented the Windham County district in the Vermont Senate since 2023. Hashim was previously a member of the Vermont House of Representatives representing the Windham-4 District from 2019 to 2020.He is a Democrat.

== Early life and education ==
Hashim was born in Boston, Massachusetts to an Iranian mother and a Sudanese father. He attended Clark University.

== Career ==
On September 15, 2023, Senator Hashim passed the Vermont Bar exam after participating in Vermont's unique alternative pathway to law, The Law Office Study Program.
