= Patrick Brennan (politician) =

American politician

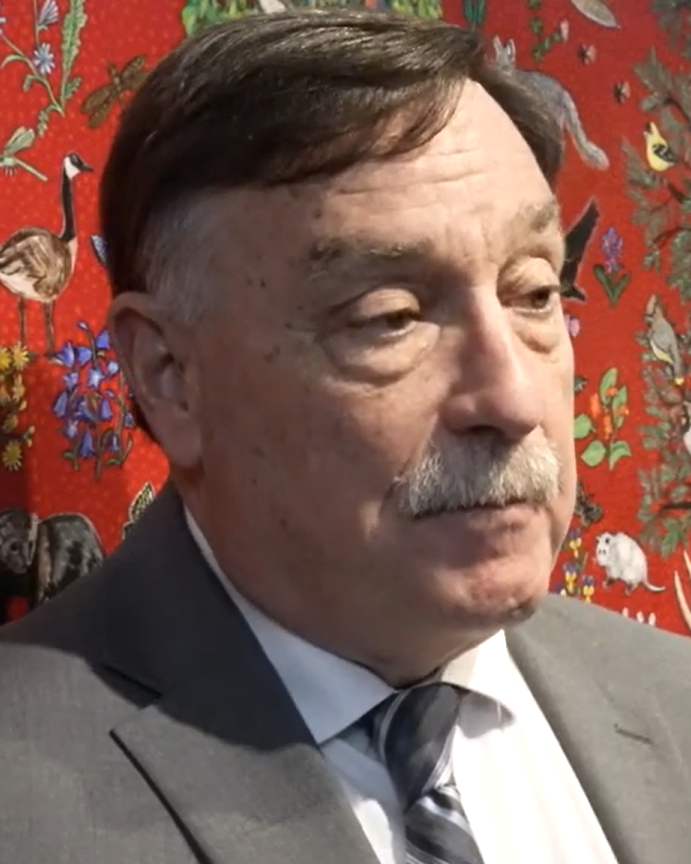
Brennan in 2025

Patrick M. Brennan (born 1953) is a Republican politician who represents the Grand Isle district in the Vermont Senate. He was succeeded by Kim Gleason in the Senate. He previously served in the Vermont House of Representatives. He represented the Chittenden-9-2 Representative District.
