= Richard McCormack (politician) =

American politician

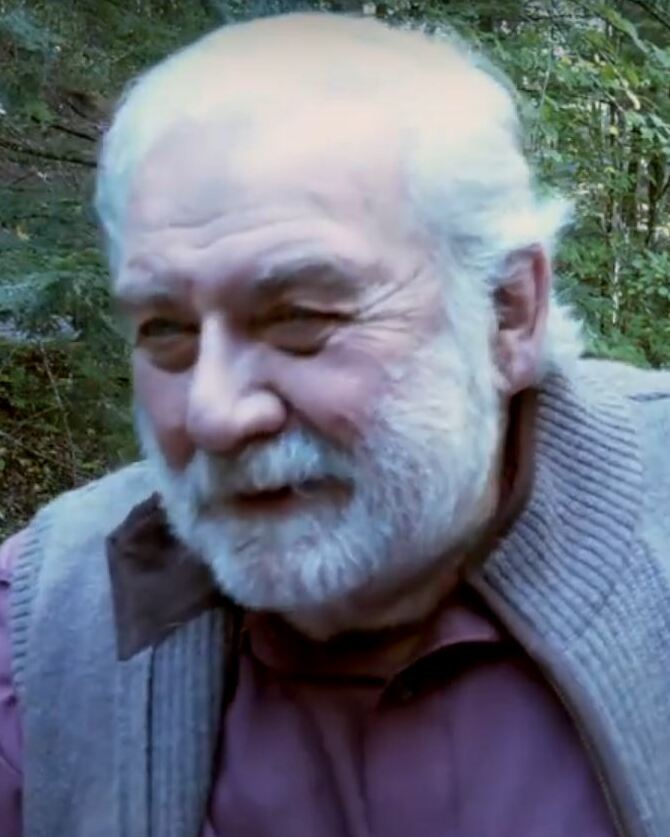
- McCormack in 2022

Democratic (Majority) Leader of the Vermont Senate
- In office 1997–2001
- Preceded by: Peter Shumlin (As Minority Leader)
- Succeeded by: Ann Cummings (As Majority Leader)

Member of the Vermont Senate from the Windsor District
- Incumbent
- Assumed office January 2007 Serving with John Campbell, Alice Nitka (2007-2017): Alice Nitka, Alison H. Clarkson (2017-)
- Preceded by: John Campbell, Matt Dunne, Peter Welch
- In office October 1989 – January 2003 Serving with: Edgar May, John Carroll (1989-1991); John Carroll, Cheryl Rivers (1991-1995); Cheryl Rivers, Ruth Harvie (1995-1997); Cheryl Rivers, Ben Ptashnik (1997-2001); John Campbell, Cheryl Rivers (Resigned December 2001), Peter Welch (Appointed December 2001) (2001-2003)
- Preceded by: Stephen Reynes
- Succeeded by: John Campbell, Matt Dunne, Peter Welch

Personal details
- Born: July 20, 1947 (age 79) New York City, New York
- Party: Democratic
- Spouse(s): Joan Carol Connor (m. 1979, div. 1981); Wendy Henderson (m. 1994, div. 1996); Cindy Metcalf (m. 2004)
- Education: Hofstra University; Vermont Law and Graduate School
- Profession: Teacher; Musician

Richard John McCormack (born July 20, 1947) is an American political figure in the state of Vermont. A Democrat, He represented the three-member at-large Windsor County district in the Vermont Senate from 1989 to 2003. In 2006, he was again elected to the State Senate, and he has been reelected every two years from 2008 to 2022.

== Early life ==
Richard "Dick" McCormack was born in New York City on July 20, 1947, a son of John Houghton McCormack and Irene Cecile (Tuohy) McCormack. He was raised and educated in New York City and graduated from Bayside High School in Queens in 1965. McCormack graduated from Hofstra University in 1970 with a Bachelor of Arts degree in U.S. History and moved to Bethel, Vermont later that year. McCormack studied Secondary Education at Castleton State College from 1977 to 1978 and received a Master's degree in Environmental Law from Vermont Law School in 2002.

== Career ==
McCormack was a professional musician and singer from 1967 to 2000 and taught U.S. history and government and the history of rock and roll in the Vermont State Colleges system. McCormack's shows typically included songs, storytelling, and commentary, and he performed at coffee houses, concert halls, weddings, bars and churches. He recorded nine albums, and also hosted a show on Vermont Public Radio, Dick McCormack’s Veranda.

Before entering the State Senate, McCormack was a Bethel justice of the peace from 1984 to 1989. In addition, he served on the District III Environmental Commission and was its chairman from 1986 to 1989.

McCormack has served on the board of directors for several civic organizations, including: Vermont Public Interest Research Group; Vermont Adult Basic Education; AIDS Community Resource Network; the Emerge Family Access Center; Champlain Valley Folk Festival; Earth Rights Institute, Operation Laundry List; and Vermont Sierra Club.

== Vermont Senate ==
A Democrat, McCormack ran unsuccessfully for the Vermont Senate in 1988. In October 1989, McCormack was appointed to fill the Senate vacancy created by the resignation of Stephen Reynes. He was elected to a full term in 1990 and reelected every two years from 1992 to 2000 and served from 1989 to 2003. From 1997 to 2001, McCormack was the body's Majority Leader.

In 2006, McCormack was again elected to the State Senate. He was reelected every two years from 2008 to 2018 and has served since 2007. During his Senate service, McCormack has served at different times as chairman of the Natural Resources and Energy Committee, vice chairman of the Judiciary Committee, and a member of the Health and Welfare, Education, General Affairs and Housing, Institutions, Finance, Appropriations, Judicial Rules, Legislative Rules, and Administrative Rules Committees. He has also served as co-chairman of the legislature's Climate Solutions Caucus.

== Family ==
In 1979, McCormack married Joan Carol Connor. They divorced in 1981. From 1994 to 1996, he was married to Wendy Henderson.

In 2004, McCormack married Cindy Metcalf, who formerly served as chief of staff to Lieutenant Governor Doug Racine and chairwoman of the Vermont Democratic Party. Between them, they have five grown children and six grandchildren.

Curt McCormack, a longtime member of the Vermont House of Representatives, is McCormack's brother.

== Sources ==
=== Internet ===
- Vermont Senate (2019). "Biography, Senator Dick McCormack". legislature.vermont.gov. Montpelier, VT: Vermont General Assembly.
- "Vermont Marriage Records, 1909-2008, Entry for Richard J. McCormack and Joan Carol Connor". Ancestry.com. Lehi, UT: Ancestry.com, LLC. June 26, 1979.
- "Vermont Divorce Index, 1925-2003, Entry for Richard J. McCormack and Joan C. Connor". Ancestry.com. Lehi, UT: Ancestry.com, LLC. October 1, 1981.
- "Vermont Marriage Index, 1981-1984, 1989-2001, Entry for Richard J. McCormack and Wendy V. Henderson". Ancestry.com. Lehi, UT: Ancestry.com, LLC. June 18, 1994.
- "Vermont Divorce Index, 1925-2003, Entry for Richard J. McCormack and Wendy V. Henderson". Ancestry.com. Lehi, UT: Ancestry.com, LLC. January 23, 1996.
- "Vermont Marriage Records, 1909-2008, Entry for Richard John McCormack and Cynthia Willard Metcalf". Ancestry.com. Lehi, UT: Ancestry.com, LLC. March 9, 2004.

=== Newspapers ===
- "Kunin Taps McCormack". Rutland Herald. Rutland, VT. October 27, 1989. p. 9 – via Newspapers.com.
- Caruso, Aimee (June 10, 2017). "Out & About: Bethel Legislator to Sing Out on Wednesday in Hartford Village". Valley News. Lebanon, NH.

== Books ==
- Vermont Legislative Directory and State Manual. Montpelier, VT: Vermont Secretary of State. 2001. p. 157.
