= Thomas F. Koch =

American politician

Thomas F. Koch (born 1942) is a Republican politician who served in the Vermont House of Representatives from 1976 to 1980 and 1996 to 2014. He represented the Washington-4 Representative District.
