= Wendy Harrison =

American politician from Vermont

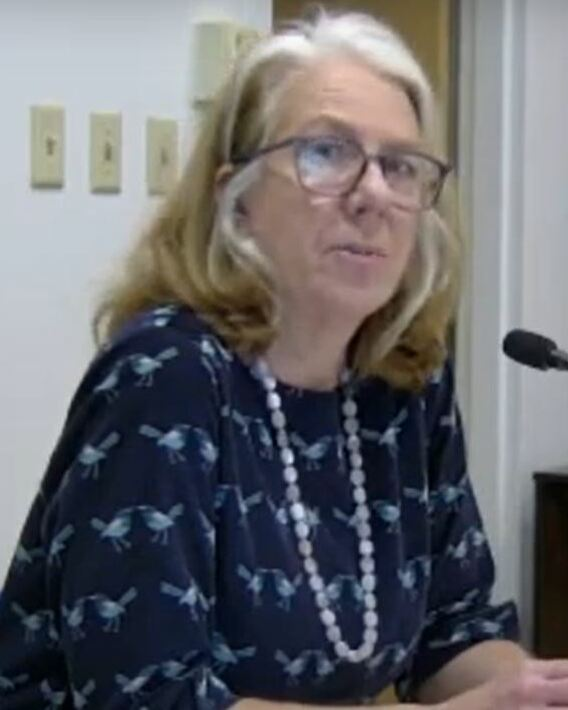
Harrison in 2022

Wendy Harrison is an American politician from the state of Vermont representing the Windham County district in the Vermont Senate since January 2023. A member of the Democratic Party, she previously worked as a traveling municipal manager, serving as the interim city manager of multiple towns across Vermont including Rockingham, Bellows Falls, Vernon, and Winooski.
