= Martine Gulick =

American politician

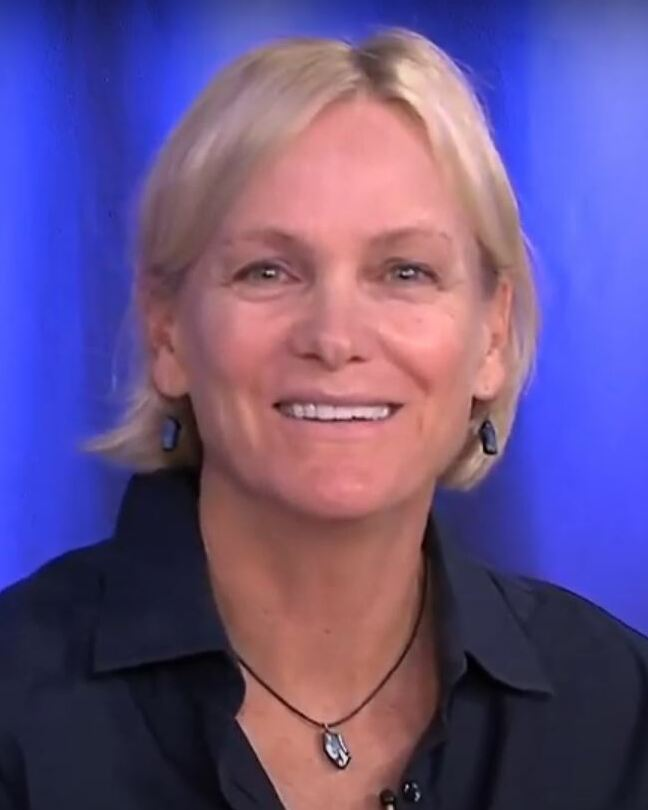
- Gulick in 2022

Member of the Vermont Senate from the Chittenden district
- Incumbent
- Assumed office January 2023

Personal details
- Born: Martine Larocque; 1966 (age 59–60) Tachikawa, Tokyo, Japan
- Party: Democratic
- Education: University of Vermont (BA, MA)
- Website: Senate website; Campaign website

Martine Larocque Gulick is an American politician from the state of Vermont who has represented the Chittenden-Central Vermont Senate District in the Vermont Senate from January 2023. A member of the Democratic Party, she previously served on the Burlington school board.

== Early life ==
Gulick was born in Tachikawa, Japan, in 1966, where her father, Phillip Laroque, was serving in the United States Air Force. Her parents are French Canadian immigrants. When Gulick was young, the family frequently moved because of her father's work, until they settled down in South Burlington, Vermont in 1972. She has a BA and MA from the University of Vermont.

== Career ==
Before running for state senate, Gulick taught French and English in high school and served as Library Director in Vermont and overseas, and has been a member of the Burlington School Board since 2018. She now serves as Co-Chair of the Finance and Facilities Committee for the school board.

Gulick is a Regional Representative on the Vermont School Board Association and served on the Advisory Council on Literacy. She also serves as the Vice-Chair of the Senate Education Committee and Clerk of the Senate Health and Welfare Committee within the Vermont Senate.

== Personal life ==
Gulick and her family lives in Burlington, Vermont. She speaks both French and English and has relatives living in Quebec. She is married with two children.
