= List of U.S. state senators =

This is a list of U.S. state senators.

== Summary ==
State	State executive	Legislature name	Lower house				Upper house			
State	State executive	Legislature name	Name	Size	Party strength	Term (yrs.)	Name	Size	Party strength	Term (yrs.)
Alabama	Governor	Legislature	House of Representatives	105	R 76–29	4	Senate	35	R 27–8	4
Alaska	Governor	Legislature	House of Representatives	40	MC 21–19 (Note: The majority in the Alaska House of Representatives is held by a coalition of 14 Democrats, 2 Republicans and 5 Independents. The minority consists of 19 Republicans.)	2	Senate	20	Coal. 14–6 NCR (Note: The majority in the Alaska Senate is held by a coalition of 9 Democrats and 5 Republicans. There are 6 Republicans outside the caucus.)	4
Arizona	Governor	State Legislature	House of Representatives	60	R 33–27	2	Senate	30	R 17–13	2
Arkansas	Governor	General Assembly	House of Representatives	100	R 81–19	2	Senate	35	R 29–6	4
California	Governor	State Legislature (Note: The Constitution of California names it the "California Legislature", but the legislature brands itself as the "California State Legislature".)	State Assembly	80	D 60–20	2	State Senate	40	D 30–10	4
Colorado	Governor	General Assembly	House of Representatives	65	D 43–22	2	Senate	35	D 23–12	4
Connecticut	Governor	General Assembly	House of Representatives	151	D 102–49	2	State Senate	36	D 25–11	2
Delaware	Governor	General Assembly	House of Representatives	41	D 27–14	2	Senate	21	D 15–6	4
Florida	Governor	Legislature	House of Representatives	120	R 86–34	2	Senate	40	R 27–12, 1 ind.	4
Georgia	Governor	General Assembly	House of Representatives	180	R 99–81	2	State Senate	56	R 33–23	2
Hawaii	Governor	Legislature	House of Representatives	51	D 41–10	2	Senate	25	D 22–3	4
Idaho	Governor	Legislature	House of Representatives	70	R 61–9	2	Senate	35	R 29–6	2
Illinois	Governor	General Assembly	House of Representatives	118	D 78–40	2	Senate	59	D 40–19	2 or 4
Indiana	Governor	General Assembly	House of Representatives	100	R 69–30, 1 ind.	2	Senate	50	R 40–10	4
Iowa	Governor	General Assembly	House of Representatives	100	R 67–33	2	Senate	50	R 33–17	4
Kansas	Governor	Legislature	House of Representatives	125	R 88–37	2	Senate	40	R 31–9	4
Kentucky	Governor	General Assembly	House of Representatives	100	R 80–20	2	Senate	38	R 32–6	4
Louisiana	Governor	Legislature (Note: The Constitution of Louisiana vests legislative authority in "a legislature, consisting of a Senate and a House of Representatives," and refers to it as "the legislature" throughout, without officially designating a term for the two houses together. However, the two bodies do use the term "Louisiana State Legislature" in official references to itself.)	House of Representatives	105	R 73–32	4	State Senate	39	R 28–11	4
Maine	Governor	Legislature	House of Representatives	151	D 75–73, 3 ind. (Note: There are three additional non-voting seats allocated to sovereign tribal nations within Maine. As of 2026, two seats of the three tribal seats are filled; the two current tribal representatives are non-partisan/independent but are not counted in this total.)	2	Senate	35	D 20–14, 1 ind.	2
Maryland	Governor	General Assembly	House of Delegates	141	D 102–39	4	Senate	47	D 34–13	4
Massachusetts	Governor	General Court	House of Representatives	160	D 134–25, 1 ind.	2	Senate	40	D 35–5	2
Michigan	Governor	Legislature	House of Representatives	110	R 58–52	2	Senate	38	D 20–18	4
Minnesota	Governor	Legislature	House of Representatives	134	T 67–67	2	Senate	67	DFL 34–33	2, 4, 4
Mississippi	Governor	Legislature	House of Representatives	122	R 78–42, 2 ind.	4	State Senate	52	R 34–18	4
Missouri	Governor	General Assembly	House of Representatives	163	R 111–52	2	Senate	34	R 24–10	4
Montana	Governor	Legislature	House of Representatives	100	R 58–42	2	Senate	50	R 32–18	4
Nebraska	Governor	Legislature	(Unicameral)				Legislature (Note: When Nebraska switched to a unicameral legislature in 1937, the lower house was abolished. All current Nebraskan legislators are referred to as "Senators", as the pre-1937 senate was the retained house.)	49	R 33–15, 1 ind. (Note: Nebraska's legislature is de jure nonpartisan but senators' political affiliations are publicly known and voting often happens along party lines; the de facto composition is given here.)	4
Nevada	Governor	Legislature	Assembly	42	D 27–15	2	Senate	21	D 13–8	4
New Hampshire	Governor	General Court	House of Representatives	400	R 220–179, 1 ind.	2	Senate	24	R 16–8	2
New Jersey	Governor	Legislature	General Assembly	80	D 57–23	2	Senate	40	D 25–15	2, 4, 4
New Mexico	Governor	Legislature	House of Representatives	70	D 44–26	2	Senate	42	D 26–16	4
New York	Governor	State Legislature	State Assembly	150	D 103–47	2	State Senate	63	D 41–22	2
North Carolina	Governor	General Assembly	House of Representatives	120	R 71–47, 2 ind.	2	Senate	50	R 30–20	2
North Dakota	Governor	Legislative Assembly	House of Representatives	94	R 83–11	4	Senate	47	R 42–5	4
Ohio	Governor	General Assembly	House of Representatives	99	R 65–34	2	Senate	33	R 24–9	4
Oklahoma	Governor	Legislature	House of Representatives	101	R 81–20	2	Senate	48	R 40–8	4
Oregon	Governor	Legislative Assembly	House of Representatives	60	D 37–23	2	State Senate	30	D 18–12	4
Pennsylvania	Governor	General Assembly	House of Representatives	203	D 102–101	2	State Senate	50	R 27–23	4
Rhode Island	Governor	General Assembly	House of Representatives	75	D 64–10, 1 ind.	2	Senate	38	D 34–4	2
South Carolina	Governor	General Assembly	House of Representatives	124	R 89–35	2	Senate	46	R 34–12	4
South Dakota	Governor	Legislature	House of Representatives	70	R 65–5	2	Senate	35	R 32–3	2
Tennessee	Governor	General Assembly	House of Representatives	99	R 75–24	2	Senate	33	R 27–6	4
Texas	Governor	Legislature	House of Representatives	150	R 88–62	2	Senate	31	R 19–12	4
Utah	Governor	State Legislature (Note: The Constitution of Utah names it the "Legislature of the State of Utah", but the legislature brands itself as the "Utah State Legislature".)	House of Representatives	75	R 61–14	2	State Senate	29	R 22–6, 1 FWD (Note: One senator is registered with the Forward Party.)	4
Vermont	Governor	General Assembly	House of Representatives	150	MC 94–56 (Note: The majority in the Vermont House of Representatives is held by a coalition of 87 Democrats, 3 Vermont Progressives and 4 independents. The minority consists of 56 Republicans.)	2	Senate	30	MC 17–13 (Note: The majority in the Vermont Senate is held by a coalition of 16 Democrats and 1 Vermont Progressive. 13 Republicans make up the minority.)	2
Virginia	Governor	General Assembly	House of Delegates	100	D 64–36	2	Senate	40	D 21–19	4
Washington	Governor	State Legislature (Note: The Constitution of Washington names it "the legislature of the state of Washington", but the legislature brands itself as the "Washington State Legislature".)	House of Representatives	98	D 59–39	2	State Senate	49	D 30–19	4
West Virginia	Governor	Legislature	House of Delegates	100	R 91–9	2	Senate	34	R 32–2	4
Wisconsin	Governor	State Legislature	State Assembly	99	R 54–45	2	Senate	33	R 18–15	4
Wyoming	Governor	Legislature	House of Representatives	62	R 56–6	2	Senate	31	R 29–2	4

== Superlatives ==
From the 50 state legislatures in the United States, the following superlatives emerge:

- Largest legislature: New Hampshire General Court (424 members)
- Smallest legislature: Nebraska Legislature (49 members)
- Largest upper house: Minnesota Senate (67 senators)
- Smallest upper house: Alaska Senate (20 senators)
- Largest lower house: New Hampshire House of Representatives (400 representatives)
- Smallest lower house: Alaska House of Representatives (40 representatives)

There are a total of 1,972 state senators nationwide, with the average state senate having 39 members.

== Alabama ==
District	Name	Party	Residence	Start	Counties
1	Tim Melson	Republican	Florence	2014	Lauderdale, part of Limestone
2	Tom Butler	Republican	Madison	2018	Parts of Limestone and Madison
3	Arthur Orr	Republican	Decatur	2006	Morgan, parts of Limestone and Madison
4	Garlan Gudger	Republican	Cullman	2018	Cullman, Marion, Winston
5	Matt Woods	Republican	Jasper	2025 (special)	Fayette, Lamar, Walker, parts of Jefferson and Tuscaloosa
6	Larry Stutts	Republican	Tuscumbia	2014	Colbert, Franklin, Lawrence, part of Limestone
7	Sam Givhan	Republican	Gurley	2018	Part of Madison
8	Steve Livingston	Republican	Scottsboro	2014	Jackson, parts of DeKalb and Madison
9	Wes Kitchens	Republican	Arab	2024 (special)	Marshall, parts of Blount and Madison
10	Andrew Jones	Republican	Centre	2018	Cherokee, Etowah, part of DeKalb
11	Lance Bell	Republican	Pell City	2022	Parts of Shelby, St. Clair, and Talladega
12	Keith Kelley	Republican	Anniston	2022	Calhoun, part of Talladega
13	Randy Price	Republican	Opelika	2018	Chambers, Clay, Cleburne, Randolph, part of Lee
14	April Weaver	Republican	Alabaster	2021 (special)	Bibb, parts of Chilton and Shelby
15	Dan Roberts	Republican	Birmingham	2018	Parts of Jefferson and Shelby
16	J. T. Waggoner	Republican	Birmingham	1990	Parts of Jefferson and Shelby
17	Shay Shelnutt	Republican	Trussville	2014	Parts of Blount, Jefferson, and St. Clair
18	Rodger Smitherman	Democratic	Birmingham	1994	Part of Jefferson
19	Merika Coleman	Democratic	Birmingham	2022	Part of Jefferson
20	Linda Coleman-Madison	Democratic	Birmingham	2006	Part of Jefferson
21	Gerald Allen	Republican	Tuscaloosa	2010	Pickens, part of Tuscaloosa
22	Greg Albritton	Republican	Range	2014	Escambia, Washington, parts of Baldwin and Mobile
23	Robert Stewart	Democratic	Selma	2022	Butler, Clarke, Conecuh, Dallas, Lowndes, Monroe, Perry, Wilcox
24	Bobby Singleton	Democratic	Greensboro	2005	Choctaw, Greene, Hale, Marengo, Sumter, part of Tuscaloosa
25	Will Barfoot	Republican	Montgomery	2018	Crenshaw, parts of Elmore and Montgomery
26	Kirk Hatcher	Democratic	Montgomery	2021 (special)	Part of Montgomery
27	Jay Hovey	Republican	Auburn	2022	Parts of Lee, Russell, and Tallapoosa
28	Billy Beasley	Democratic	Clayton	2010	Barbour, Bullock, Henry, Macon, parts of Houston and Russell
29	Donnie Chesteen	Republican	Geneva	2018	Geneva, parts of Dale and Houston
30	Clyde Chambliss	Republican	Prattville	2014	Autauga, Coosa, parts of Chilton, Elmore, and Tallapoosa
31	Josh Carnley	Republican	Ino	2022	Coffee, Covington, Pike, part of Dale
32	Chris Elliott	Republican	Spanish Fort	2018	Part of Baldwin
33	Vivian Davis Figures	Democratic	Mobile	1997	Parts of Baldwin and Mobile
34	Jack Williams	Republican	Wilmer	2018	Part of Mobile
35	David Sessions	Republican	Grand Bay	2018	Part of Mobile

== Alaska ==
Alaska State Senate 34th Alaska State Legislature, 2025–2026
District	Name	Party	Residence	Start	Next Election
A	Bert Stedman	Republican (Note: Member of the bipartisan majority)	Sitka	2003 (Note: Senator was originally appointed)	2026
B	Jesse Kiehl	Democratic	Juneau	2019	2028
C	Gary Stevens	Republican	Kodiak	2003	2026
D	Jesse Bjorkman	Republican	Nikiski	2023	2028
E	Cathy Giessel	Republican	Anchorage	2023 (2011–2021)	2026
F	James Kaufman	Republican	Anchorage	2023	2028
G	Elvi Gray-Jackson	Democratic	Anchorage	2019	2026
H	Matt Claman	Democratic	Anchorage	2023	2028
I	Löki Tobin	Democratic	Anchorage	2023	2026
J	Forrest Dunbar	Democratic	Anchorage	2023	2028
K	Bill Wielechowski	Democratic	Anchorage	2007	2026
L	Kelly Merrick	Republican	Eagle River	2023	2028
M	Cathy Tilton	Republican	Wasilla	2025	2026
N	Robert Yundt	Republican	Wasilla	2025	2028
O	George Rauscher	Republican	Sutton	2025	2026
P	Scott Kawasaki	Democratic	Fairbanks	2019	2028
Q	Robert Myers	Republican	North Pole	2021	2026
R	Mike Cronk	Republican	Tok	2025	2028
S	Lyman Hoffman	Democratic	Bethel	1995	2026
T	Donny Olson	Democratic	Golovin	2001	2028

== Arizona ==
District	Name	Party	Residence	First Election	Term Limited
1	Mark Finchem	Rep	Prescott	2024	No
2	Shawnna Bolick	Rep	Phoenix	2023 (Note: Appointed.)	No
3	John Kavanagh	Rep	Scottsdale	2022	No
4	Carine Werner	Rep	Scottsdale	2024	No
5	Lela Alston (Note: Alston represented the 24th district from 2019–2023.)	Dem	Phoenix	2018	Yes
6	Theresa Hatathlie	Dem	Coal Mine Mesa	2022	No
7	Wendy Rogers	Rep	Flagstaff	2022	No
8	Lauren Kuby	Dem	Tempe	2024	No
9	Kiana Sears	Dem	Mesa	2025	No
10	Dave Farnsworth	Rep	Mesa	2022	No
11	Catherine Miranda	Dem	Phoenix	2022	No
12	Mitzi Epstein	Dem	Chandler	2022	No
13	J. D. Mesnard (Note: Mesnard represented the 17th district from 2019–2023.)	Rep	Chandler	2018	Yes
14	Warren Petersen	Rep	Gilbert	2020	No
15	Jake Hoffman	Rep	Queen Creek	2022	No
16	T. J. Shope	Rep	Coolidge	2022	No
17	Vince Leach	Rep	Tucson	2024	No
18	Priya Sundareshan	Dem	Tucson	2022	No
19	David Gowan	Rep	Sierra Vista	2022	No
20	Sally Ann Gonzales	Dem	Tucson	2022	No
21	Rosanna Gabaldón	Dem	Sahuarita	2022	No
22	Eva Diaz	Dem	Tolleson	2022	No
23	Brian Fernandez	Dem	Yuma	2022	No
24	Analise Ortiz	Dem	Phoenix	2024	No
25	Tim Dunn	Rep	Yuma	2024	No
26	Flavio Bravo	Dem	Phoenix	2023	No
27	Kevin Payne	Rep	Sun City	2024	No
28	Frank Carroll	Rep	Surprise	2022	No
29	Janae Shamp	Rep	Surprise	2022	No
30	Hildy Angius	Rep	Bullhead City	2024	No

== Arkansas ==
District	Name	Party	Residence	Start	Next Election	Term Limited
1st	Vacant (Note: Republican Ben Gilmore resigned in order to take a position in the office of the state attorney general.)				2026 (special)	
2nd	Matt Stone	Rep	Camden	2022	2026	2034
3rd	Steve Crowell	Rep	Magnolia	2022	2028	2034
4th	Jimmy Hickey Jr.	Rep	Texarkana	2012	2028	2028
5th	Terry Rice	Rep	Waldron	2014	2028	2030
6th	Matt McKee	Rep	Pearcy	2022	2028	2034
7th	Alan Clark	Rep	Lonsdale	2012	2026	2028
8th	Stephanie Flowers	Dem	Pine Bluff	2010	2028	2026
9th	Reginald Murdock	Dem	Marianna	2010	2026	2026
10th	Ron Caldwell	Rep	Wynne	2012	2026	2028
11th	Ricky Hill	Rep	Cabot	2018 (special)	2026	2034
12th	Jamie Scott	Dem	North Little Rock	2024	2028	2034
13th	Jane English	Rep	North Little Rock	2012	2026	2028
14th	Clarke Tucker	Dem	Little Rock	2014	2026	2032
15th	Fredrick Love	Dem	Mabelvale	2010	2026	2026
16th	Kim Hammer	Rep	Benton	2018	2026	2034
17th	Mark Johnson	Rep	Little Rock	2018	2028	2034
18th	Jonathan Dismang	Rep	Beebe	2010	2028	2026
19th	David Wallace	Rep	Leachville	2016	2028	2032
20th	Dan Sullivan	Rep	Jonesboro	2014	2028	2030
21st	Blake Johnson	Rep	Corning	2014	2026	2030
22nd	John Payton	Rep	Wilburn	2012	2028	2028
23rd	Scott Flippo	Rep	Mountain Home	2014	2028	2030
24th	Missy Irvin	Rep	Mountain View	2010	2026	2026
25th	Breanne Davis	Rep	Russellville	2018 (special)	2028	2034
26th	Brad Simon	Rep	Paris	2026 (special)	2028	2038
27th	Justin Boyd	Rep	Fort Smith	2014	2026	2030
28th	Bryan King	Rep	Green Forest	2013	2026	2034
29th	Jim Petty	Rep	Van Buren	2022	2028	2034
30th	Greg Leding	Dem	Fayetteville	2018	2026	2034
31st	Clint Penzo	Rep	Springdale	2016	2026	2032
32nd	Joshua P. Bryant	Rep	Rogers	2020	2026	2036
33rd	Bart Hester	Rep	Cave Springs	2012	2028	2028
34th	Jim Dotson	Rep	Bentonville	2012	2028	2028
35th	Tyler Dees	Rep	Siloam Springs	2022	2026	2034

== California ==
District	Name	Party	Residence	Start	Term limited	Notes
1	Megan Dahle	Republican	Bieber	2024	2028	Previously served in the Assembly from 2019 to 2024.
2	Mike McGuire	Democratic	Healdsburg	2014	2026	Previously served as president pro Tempore from 2024 to 2025
3	Christopher Cabaldon	Democratic	West Sacramento	2024	2036	
4	Marie Alvarado-Gil	Republican	Jackson	2022	2034	First elected as a Democrat before switching parties on August 8, 2024
5	Jerry McNerney	Democratic	Pleasanton	2024	2036	
6	Roger Niello	Republican	Fair Oaks	2022	2030	Previously served in the Assembly from 2004 to 2010.
7	Jesse Arreguín	Democratic	Berkeley	2024	2036	
8	Angelique Ashby	Democratic	Natomas	2022	2034	Majority Leader since December 23, 2025.
9	Tim Grayson	Democratic	Concord	2024	2028	Previously served in the Assembly from 2016 to 2024.
10	Aisha Wahab	Democratic	Hayward	2022	2034	
11	Scott Wiener	Democratic	San Francisco	2016	2028	
12	Shannon Grove	Republican	Bakersfield	2018	2026	Previously served as Minority Leader from 2019 to 2021 and in the Assembly from 2010 to 2016.
13	Josh Becker	Democratic	Menlo Park	2020	2032	
14	Anna Caballero	Democratic	Merced	2018	2026	Previously served in the Assembly from 2006 to 2010 and 2016 to 2018.
15	Dave Cortese	Democratic	San Jose	2020	2032	
16	Melissa Hurtado	Democratic	Bakersfield	2018	2030	
17	John Laird	Democratic	Santa Cruz	2020	2028	Previously served in the Assembly from 2002 to 2008.
18	Steve Padilla	Democratic	Chula Vista	2022	2034	
19	Rosilicie Ochoa Bogh	Republican	Yucaipa	2020	2032	
20	Caroline Menjivar	Democratic	San Fernando	2022	2034	
21	Monique Limón	Democratic	Santa Barbara	2020	2028	Previously served in the Assembly from 2016 to 2020. President pro tempore
22	Susan Rubio	Democratic	Baldwin Park	2018	2030	
23	Suzette Martinez Valladares	Republican	Santa Clarita	2024	2032	Previously served the Assembly from 2020 to 2022.
24	Ben Allen	Democratic	Santa Monica	2014	2026	
25	Sasha Renée Pérez	Democratic	Alhambra	2024	2036	
26	María Elena Durazo	Democratic	Los Angeles	2018	2030	
27	Henry Stern	Democratic	Malibu	2016	2028	
28	Lola Smallwood-Cuevas	Democratic	Los Angeles	2022	2034	
29	Eloise Reyes	Democratic	Colton	2024	2028	Previously served in the Assembly from 2016 to 2024
30	Bob Archuleta	Democratic	Pico Rivera	2018	2030	
31	Sabrina Cervantes	Democratic	Riverside	2024	2028	Previously served in the Assembly from 2016 to 2024
32	Kelly Seyarto	Republican	Murrieta	2022	2030	Previously served in the Assembly from 2020 to 2022.
33	Lena Gonzalez	Democratic	Long Beach	2019 (Note: Joined after a special election)	2032	
34	Tom Umberg	Democratic	Santa Ana	2018	2026	Previously served in the Assembly from 1990 to 1994 and 2004 to 2006.
35	Laura Richardson	Democratic	San Pedro	2024	2032	Previously served in the U.S. House from 2007 to 2013 and in the Assembly from 2006 to 2007.
36	Tony Strickland	Republican	Huntington Beach	2025	2030	Previously served in the Assembly from 1998 to 2004 and in the State Senate from 2008 to 2012
37	Steven Choi	Republican	Irvine	2024	2028	Previously served in the Assembly from 2016 to 2022
38	Catherine Blakespear	Democratic	Encinitas	2022	2034	
39	Akilah Weber	Democratic	San Diego	2024	2032	Previously served in the Assembly from 2021 to 2024
40	Brian Jones	Republican	Santee	2018	2026	Minority Leader. Previously served in the Assembly from 2010 to 2016.

=== Seating chart ===
					President; Kounalakis		President pro tempore Limón
Niello	Ochoa Bogh	Hurtado	Becker	Smallwood-Cuevas	Stern	Cabaldon	McNerney	Durazo	Richardson	Caballero	Allen
Alvarado-Gil	Strickland	Choi	Grove	Pérez	Menjivar	Cervantes	Rubio	Weber Pierson	Blakespear	Gonzalez	Weiner
Valladares	Jones	Seyarto	Dahle	Arreguín	Umberg	Laird	Padilla	Grayson	Wahab	Cortese	Archuleta
				McGuire	Limón	Ashby	Reyes

== Colorado ==
District	Name	Party	Residence	Start	Next election
1	Byron Pelton	Republican	Sterling	2022	2026
2	Lisa Frizell	Republican	Castle Rock	2024	2028
3	Nick Hinrichsen	Democratic	Pueblo	2022 (Note: Originally appointed.)	2026
4	Mark Baisley	Republican	Sedalia	2022	2026
5	Marc Catlin	Republican	Montrose	2024	2028
6	Cleave Simpson	Republican	Alamosa	2020	2028 (term limited)
7	Janice Rich	Republican	Grand Junction	2022	2026
8	Dylan Roberts	Democratic	Eagle	2022	2026
9	Lynda Zamora Wilson	Republican	Air Force Academy	2025	2026
10	Larry Liston	Republican	Colorado Springs	2020	2028 (term limited)
11	Tony Exum	Democratic	Colorado Springs	2022	2026
12	Marc Snyder	Democratic	Manitou Springs	2024	2028
13	Scott Bright	Republican	Platteville	2024	2028
14	Cathy Kipp	Democratic	Fort Collins	2024	2028
15	Janice Marchman	Democratic	Loveland	2022	2026
16	Chris Kolker	Democratic	Centennial	2020	2028 (term limited)
17	Katie Wallace	Democratic	Longmont	2025	2026 (special)
18	Judy Amabile	Democratic	Boulder	2024	2028
19	Lindsey Daugherty	Democratic	Arvada	2024	2028
20	Lisa Cutter	Democratic	Evergreen	2022	2026
21	Adrienne Benavidez	Democratic	Denver	2026	2026 (special)
22	Jessie Danielson	Democratic	Wheat Ridge	2018	2026 (term limited)
23	Barbara Kirkmeyer	Republican	Brighton	2020	2028 (term limited)
24	Kyle Mullica	Democratic	Northglenn	2022	2026
25	William Lindstedt	Democratic	Broomfield	2025	2026
26	Jeff Bridges	Democratic	Greenwood Village	2019	2028 (term limited)
27	Tom Sullivan	Democratic	Centennial	2022	2026
28	Mike Weissman	Democratic	Aurora	2024	2028
29	Iman Jodeh	Democratic	Aurora	2025	2026 (special)
30	John Carson	Republican	Highlands Ranch	2025	2026
31	Matthew Ball	Democratic	Denver	2025	2026 (special)
32	Robert Rodriguez	Democratic	Denver	2018	2026 (term limited)
33	James Coleman	Democratic	Denver	2020	2028 (term limited)
34	Julie Gonzales	Democratic	Denver	2018	2026 (term limited)
35	Rod Pelton	Republican	Cheyenne Wells	2022	2026

== Connecticut ==
Current members of the Connecticut Senate, as of February 28, 2025.

District	Name	Party	Residence	Start	Towns represented
1	John Fonfara	Dem	Hartford	1996	Hartford (part), Wethersfield (part)
2	Douglas McCrory	Dem	Bloomfield	2017 (Note: First elected in a special election.)	Bloomfield (part), Hartford (part), Windsor (part)
3	Saud Anwar	Dem	South Windsor	2019	East Hartford, East Windsor, Ellington (part), South Windsor
4	MD Rahman	Dem	Manchester	2022	Andover, Bolton, Glastonbury, Manchester
5	Derek Slap	Dem	West Hartford	2019	Bloomfield (part), Burlington, Farmington (part), West Hartford
6	Rick Lopes	Dem	New Britain	2020	Berlin, Farmington (part), New Britain
7	John Kissel	Rep	Enfield	1993	East Granby, Ellington (part), Enfield, Granby (part), Somers, Suffield, Windsor (part), Windsor Locks
8	Paul Honig	Dem	Harwinton	2024	Avon, Barkhamsted, Canton, Colebrook, Granby (part), Hartland, Harwinton (part), Hartland, Norfolk, Simsbury, Torrington (part)
9	Matthew Lesser	Dem	Middletown	2018	Cromwell, Middletown (part), Newington, Rocky Hill, Wethersfield (part)
10	Gary Winfield	Dem	New Haven	2014	New Haven (part), West Haven (part)
11	Martin Looney	Dem	New Haven	1993	Hamden (part), New Haven (part)
12	Christine Cohen	Dem	Guilford	2018	Branford, Durham (part), East Haven (part), Guilford, Killingworth, Madison, Middlefield (part), North Branford (part)
13	Jan Hochadel	Dem	Meriden	2022	Cheshire (part), Meriden, Middlefield (part), Middletown (part)
14	James Maroney	Dem	Milford	2018	Milford, Orange, West Haven (part), Woodbridge (part)
15	Joan Hartley	Dem	Waterbury	2000	Middlebury (part), Naugatuck (part), Waterbury (part)
16	Rob Sampson	Rep	Wolcott	2018	Cheshire (part), Prospect, Southington, Waterbury (part), Wolcott
17	Jorge Cabrera	Dem	Hamden	2020	Ansonia, Beacon Falls, Bethany, Derby, Hamden (part), Naugatuck (part), Woodbridge (part)
18	Heather Somers	Rep	Groton	2016	Griswold, Groton, North Stonington, Plainfield, Preston, Sterling, Stonington, Voluntown
19	Catherine Osten	Dem	Sprague	2012	Columbia, Franklin, Hebron, Lebanon, Ledyard, Lisbon, Marlborough, Montville (part), Norwich, Sprague
20	Martha Marx	Dem	New London	2022	Bozrah, East Lyme, Montville (part), New London, Old Lyme, Old Saybrook (part), Salem, Waterford
21	Jason Perillo	Rep	Shelton	2025	Monroe (part), Seymour (part), Shelton, Stratford (part)
22	Sujata Gadkar-Wilcox	Dem	Trumbull	2024	Bridgeport (part), Monroe (part), Trumbull
23	Herron Gaston	Dem	Bridgeport	2022	Bridgeport (part), Stratford (part)
24	Julie Kushner	Dem	Danbury	2018	Danbury, New Fairfield (part), Ridgefield (part)
25	Bob Duff	Dem	Norwalk	2004	Darien (part), Norwalk
26	Ceci Maher	Dem	Wilton	2022	Darien (part), New Canaan (part), Stamford (part), Redding, Ridgefield (part), Weston (part), Westport, Wilton
27	Patricia Billie Miller	Dem	Stamford	2021	Darien (part), Stamford (part)
28	Tony Hwang	Rep	Fairfield	2014	Bethel (part), Easton, Fairfield, Newtown,
29	Mae Flexer	Dem	Windham	2014	Brooklyn, Canterbury, Killingly, Mansfield, Pomfret, Putnam, Scotland, Thompson (part), Windham
30	Stephen Harding	Rep	Brookfield	2022	Bethlehem (part), Brookfield (part), Canaan, Cornwall, Goshen, Kent, Litchfield, Morris, New Fairfield (part), New Milford, North Canaan, Salisbury, Sharon, Sherman, Torrington (part), Warren, Washington (part), Winchester
31	Henri Martin	Rep	Bristol	2014	Bristol, Harwinton (part), Plainville, Plymouth, Thomaston
32	Eric Berthel	Rep	Watertown	2017	Bethel (part), Bethlehem (part), Bridgewater, Brookfield (part), Middlebury (part), Oxford, Roxbury, Seymour (part), Southbury, Washington (part), Watertown, Woodbury
33	Norman Needleman	Dem	Essex	2018	Chester, Clinton, Colchester, Deep River, East Haddam, East Hampton, Essex, Haddam, Lyme, Old Saybrook (part), Portland, Westbrook
34	Paul Cicarella	Rep	North Haven	2020	Durham (part), East Haven (part), North Branford (part), North Haven, Wallingford
35	Jeff Gordon	Rep	Woodstock	2022	Ashford, Chaplin, Coventry, Eastford, Ellington (part), Hampton,Stafford, Thompson (part), Tolland, Union, Vernon, Willington, Woodstock
36	Ryan Fazio	Rep	Greenwich	2021	Greenwich, New Canaan (part), Stamford (part)

== Delaware ==
Below are the Senators as of the 153rd General Assembly (2024–2026), following the most recent election.

District	Name	Party	Start	Residence	Next Election
1st	Dan Cruce	Dem	2025	Wilmington	2026
2nd	Darius J. Brown	Dem	2018	Wilmington	2028
3rd	Elizabeth Lockman	Dem	2018	Wilmington	2028
4th	Laura Sturgeon	Dem	2018	Brandywine Hundred	2028
5th	Ray Seigfried	Dem	2025	Arden	2026
6th	Russ Huxtable	Dem	2022	Lewes	2028
7th	Spiros Mantzavinos	Dem	2020	Westgate Farms	2026
8th	David Sokola	Dem	1990	Newark	2026
9th	Jack Walsh	Dem	2016	Newport	2026
10th	Stephanie Hansen	Dem	2017	Middletown	2028
11th	Bryan Townsend	Dem	2012	Westover Woods	2028
12th	Nicole Poore	Dem	2012	Barbs Farm	2026
13th	Marie Pinkney	Dem	2020	New Castle County	2026
14th	Kyra Hoffner	Dem	2022	Leipsic	2026
15th	David G. Lawson	Rep	2010	Marydel	2026
16th	Eric Buckson	Rep	2022	Camden	2028
17th	W. Charles Paradee	Dem	2018	Dover	2028
18th	David L. Wilson	Rep	2018	Lincoln	2028
19th	Brian G. Pettyjohn	Rep	2012	Georgetown	2026
20th	Gerald Hocker	Rep	2012	Ocean View	2026
21st	Bryant Richardson	Rep	2014	Laurel	2028

== Florida ==
District	Name	Party	Residence	Counties	Start	Next Election
1	Don Gaetz	Rep	Crestview	Escambia, Santa Rosa, part of Okaloosa	2024	2028
2	Jay Trumbull	Rep	Panama City	Bay, Calhoun, Holmes, Jackson, Walton, Washington, part of Okaloosa	2022	2026
3	Corey Simon	Rep	Tallahassee	Dixie, Franklin, Gadsden, Gulf, Hamilton, Jefferson, Lafayette, Leon, Liberty, Madison, Suwannee, Taylor, Wakulla	2022	2028
4	Clay Yarborough	Rep	Jacksonville	Nassau, part of Duval	2022	2026
5	Tracie Davis	Dem	Jacksonville	Part of Duval	2022	2028
6	Jennifer Bradley	Rep	Fleming Island	Baker, Bradford, Clay, Columbia, Gilchrist, Union, part of Alachua	2020	2026
7	Tom Leek	Rep	Ormond Beach	Flagler, Putnam, St. Johns, part of Volusia	2024	2028
8	Tom A. Wright	Rep	New Smyrna Beach	Parts of Brevard and Volusia	2018	2026 (term limited)
9	Stan McClain	Rep	Summerfield	Marion, parts of Alachua and Levy	2024	2028
10	Jason Brodeur	Rep	Sanford	Seminole, part of Orange	2020	2026
11	Ralph Massullo	Rep	Lecanto	Citrus, Hernando, Sumter, part of Pasco	2025 (Note: First elected in a special election.)	2028
12	Colleen Burton	Rep	Lakeland	Part of Polk	2022	2026
13	Keith Truenow	Rep	Tavares	Lake, part of Orange	2024	2028
14	Brian Nathan	Dem	Tampa	Part of Hillsborough	2026	2026
15	LaVon Bracy Davis	Dem	Ocoee	Part of Orange	2025	2028
16	Darryl Rouson	Dem	St. Petersburg	Parts of Hillsborough and Pinellas	2016	2026 (term limited)
17	Carlos Smith	Dem	Orlando	Part of Orange	2024	2028
18	Nick DiCeglie	Rep	Indian Rocks Beach	Part of Pinellas	2022	2026
19	Debbie Mayfield	Rep	Indialantic	Part of Brevard	2025	2028
20	Jim Boyd	Rep	Bradenton	Parts of Hillsborough and Manatee	2020	2026
21	Ed Hooper	Rep	Clearwater	Parts of Pasco and Pinellas	2018	2028 (term limited)
22	Joe Gruters	Rep	Sarasota	Sarasota, part of Manatee	2018	2026 (term limited)
23	Danny Burgess	Rep	Zephyrhills	Parts of Hillsborough and Pasco	2020	2028 (term limited)
24	Mack Bernard	Dem	West Palm Beach	Part of Palm Beach	2024	2026
25	Kristen Arrington	Dem	Orlando	Osceola, part of Orange	2024	2028
26	Lori Berman	Dem	Lantana	Part of Palm Beach	2018	2026 (term limited)
27	Ben Albritton	Rep	Wauchula	Charlotte, DeSoto, Hardee, parts of Lee and Polk	2018	2028 (term limited)
28	Kathleen Passidomo	Rep	Naples	Collier, Hendry, part of Lee	2016	2026 (term limited)
29	Erin Grall	Rep	Vero Beach	Glades, Highlands, Indian River, Okeechobee, part of St. Lucie	2022	2028
30	Tina Polsky	Dem	Boca Raton	Parts of Broward and Palm Beach	2020	2026
31	Gayle Harrell	Rep	Stuart	Martin, parts of Palm Beach and St. Lucie	2018	2028 (term limited)
32	Rosalind Osgood	Dem	Fort Lauderdale	Part of Broward	2022	2026
33	Jonathan Martin	Rep	Fort Myers	Part of Lee	2022	2028
34	Shevrin Jones	Dem	West Park	Part of Miami-Dade	2020	2026
35	Barbara Sharief	Dem	Plantation	Part of Broward	2024	2028
36	Ileana Garcia	Rep	Miami	Part of Miami-Dade	2020	2026
37	Jason Pizzo	Ind (Note: Pizzo served as a Democrat from 2018–2025 before switching to Independent.)	North Miami Beach	Parts of Broward and Miami-Dade	2018	2028 (term limited)
38	Alexis Calatayud	Rep	Miami	Part of Miami-Dade	2022	2026
39	Bryan Avila	Rep	Hialeah	Part of Miami-Dade	2022	2028
40	Ana Maria Rodriguez	Rep	Doral	Monroe, part of Miami-Dade	2020	2026

== Georgia ==
As of June 2026, the Georgia State Senate is composed of 56 members:

District	Name	Party	Start	Residence	Counties
1	Ben Watson	Republican	2015	Savannah	Bryan, Liberty, part of Chatham
2	Derek Mallow	Democratic	2023	Savannah	Part of Chatham
3	Mike Hodges	Republican	2023	Brunswick	Brantley, Camden, Charlton, Glynn, McIntosh, part of Ware
4	Billy Hickman	Republican	2020	Statesboro	Bulloch, Candler, Effingham, Evans, part of Chatham
5	Sheikh Rahman	Democratic	2019	Lawrenceville	Part of Gwinnett
6	Matt Brass	Republican	2017	Newnan	Coweta, Heard, part of Carroll
7	Adrienne White	Democratic	2026	Duluth	Part of Gwinnett
8	Russ Goodman	Republican	2021	Cogdell	Atkinson, Clinch, Echols, Lanier, Lowndes, Pierce, part of Ware
9	Nikki Merritt	Democratic	2021	Grayson	Part of Gwinnett
10	Emanuel Jones	Democratic	2005	Decatur	Parts of DeKalb and Henry
11	Sam Watson	Republican	2023	Moultrie	Brooks, Colquitt, Cook, Decatur, Grady, Seminole, Thomas
12	Freddie Sims	Democratic	2009	Dawson	Baker, Calhoun, Clay, Dougherty, Early, Miller, Mitchell, Quitman, Randolph, Stewart, Sumter, Terrell, Webster
13	Carden Summers	Republican	2020	Cordele	Ben Hill, Berrien, Crisp, Irwin, Lee, Tift, Turner, Worth, part of Coffee
14	Josh McLaurin	Democratic	2023	Sandy Springs	Part of Fulton
15	Ed Harbison	Democratic	1993	Columbus	Chattahoochee, Macon, Marion, Schley, Talbot, Taylor, part of Muscogee
16	Marty Harbin	Republican	2015	Tyrone	Lamar, Pike, Spalding, part of Fayette
17	Gail Davenport	Democratic	2007	Jonesboro	Parts of Clayton and Henry
18	Steven McNeel	Republican	2026	Macon	Crawford, Monroe, Peach, Upson, parts of Bibb and Houston
19	Blake Tillery	Republican	2017	Vidalia	Appling, Bacon, Jeff Davis, Long, Montgomery, Tattnall, Telfair, Toombs, Wayne, Wheeler, part of Coffee
20	Larry Walker III	Republican	2015	Perry	Bleckley, Dodge, Dooly, Laurens, Pulaski, Treutlen, Wilcox, part of Houston
21	Jason Dickerson	Republican	2025	Canton	Parts of Cherokee and Fulton
22	Harold V. Jones II	Democratic	2015	Augusta	Part of Richmond
23	Max Burns	Republican	2021	Sylvania	Burke, Emanuel, Glascock, Jefferson, Jenkins, McDuffie, Screven, Taliaferro, Warren, parts of Columbia and Richmond
24	Lee Anderson	Republican	2017	Grovetown	Elbert, Greene, Hart, Lincoln, Oglethorpe, Wilkes, part of Columbia
25	Rick Williams	Republican	2023	Milledgeville	Baldwin, Butts, Jasper, Jones, Putnam, parts of Bibb and Henry
26	David Lucas	Democratic	2013	Macon	Hancock, Johnson, Twiggs, Washington, Wilkinson, parts of Bibb and Houston
27	Greg Dolezal	Republican	2019	Cumming	Part of Forsyth
28	Donzella James	Democratic	2009	Atlanta	Parts of Cobb, Douglas, and Fulton
29	Randy Robertson	Republican	2019	Cataula	Harris, Meriwether, Troup, part of Muscogee
30	Tim Bearden	Republican	2024	Carrollton	Haralson, parts of Carroll, Douglas, and Paulding
31	Jason Anavitarte	Republican	2021	Dallas	Polk, part of Paulding
32	Kay Kirkpatrick	Republican	2017	Marietta	Parts Cherokee and Cobb
33	Michael Rhett	Democratic	2015	Marietta	Part of Cobb
34	Kenya Wicks	Democratic	2025	Fayetteville	Parts of Clayton and Fayette
35	Jaha Howard	Democratic	2025	Smyrna	Parts of Cobb and Fulton
36	Nan Orrock	Democratic	2007	Atlanta	Part of Fulton
37	Ed Setzler	Republican	2023	Acworth	Parts of Bartow and Cobb
38	RaShaun Kemp	Democratic	2025	Atlanta	Part of Fulton
39	Sonya Halpern	Democratic	2021	Atlanta	Part of Fulton
40	Sally Harrell	Democratic	2019	Atlanta	Parts of DeKalb and Gwinnett
41	Kim Jackson	Democratic	2021	Stone Mountain	Part of DeKalb
42	Brian Strickland	Republican	2018	McDonough	Morgan, parts of Henry, Newton, and Walton
43	Tonya Anderson	Democratic	2017	Lithonia	Rockdale, parts of DeKalb, Gwinnett, and Newton
44	Elena Parent	Democratic	2015	Atlanta	Parts of Clayton and DeKalb
45	Clint Dixon	Republican	2021	Buford	Parts of Barrow and Gwinnett
46	Bill Cowsert	Republican	2007	Athens	Parts of Barrow, Clarke, Gwinnett, Oconee, and Walton
47	Frank Ginn	Republican	2011	Danielsville	Madison, parts of Barrow, Clarke, and Jackson
48	Shawn Still	Republican	2023	Suwanee	Parts of Forsyth, Fulton, and Gwinnett
49	Drew Echols	Republican	2025	Gainesville	Part of Hall
50	Bo Hatchett	Republican	2021	Cornelia	Banks, Franklin, Habersham, Rabun, Stephens, Towns, parts of Hall, Jackson, and White
51	Steve Gooch	Republican	2011	Dahlonega	Dawson, Fannin, Gilmer, Lumpkin, Pickens, Union, part of White
52	Chuck Hufstetler	Republican	2013	Rome	Parts of Bartow, Floyd, and Gordon
53	Lanny Thomas	Republican	2026	Trion	Catoosa, Chattooga, Dade, Walker, part of Floyd
54	Chuck Payne	Republican	2017	Dalton	Murray, Whitfield, part of Gordon
55	Randal Mangham	Democratic	2025	Stone Mountain	Parts of DeKalb and Gwinnett
56	John Albers	Republican	2011	Roswell	Parts of Cherokee, Cobb, and Fulton

== Hawaii ==
District	Name	Party	County(ies)	Areas represented	Start
1	Lorraine Inouye	Dem	Hawaiʻi	Hilo, Pauka‘a, Papaikou, Pepe‘ekeo	2014 (Note: Previously served in Senate from 1998 to 2008)
2	Joy San Buenaventura	Dem	Hawaiʻi	Puna	2020 (Note: Previously served in House from 2014 to 2020)
3	Dru Kanuha	Dem	Hawaiʻi	Kona, Kaʻū, Volcano	2018
4	Tim Richards III	Dem	Hawaiʻi	Hilo, Hāmākua, Kohala, Waimea, Waikōloa, Kona	2022
5	Troy Hashimoto	Dem	Maui	Wailuku, Waiheʻe, Kahului, Mauka, Wai'ehu	2023 (Note: Senator was originally appointed) (Note: Previously served in House from 2018 to 2023)
6	Angus McKelvey	Dem	Maui	West and South Maui, Maalaea, Waikapu	2022 (Note: Previously served in House from 2006 to 2022)
7	Lynn DeCoite	Dem	Maui, Kalawao	Hāna, East and Upcountry Maui, Molokaʻi, Lānaʻi and Kahoʻolawe, Molokini	2021 (Note: Previously served in House from 2015 to 2021)
8	Ron Kouchi	Dem	Kauaʻi	Kauaʻi, Niʻihau	2010
9	Stanley Chang	Dem	Honolulu	Hawaiʻi Kai, ʻĀina Haina, Waiʻalae-Kāhala, Diamond Head, Kaimuki, Kapahulu	2016
10	Les Ihara Jr.	Dem	Honolulu	Kaimukī, Kapahulu, Pālolo, Maunalani Heights, St. Louis Heights, Mōʻiliʻili, Ala Wai mauka, Kapahulu, Moiliili, McCully	1994 (Note: Previously served in House from 1986 to 1994)
11	Carol Fukunaga	Dem	Honolulu	Mānoa, Makiki, Punchbowl, Papakōlea, Tantalus	2022 (Note: Previously served in House from 1979 to 1982, House from 1987 to 1992, and Senate from 1992 to 2012)
12	Sharon Moriwaki	Dem	Honolulu	Kakaʻako, Ala Moana, Waikīkī, McCully	2018
13	Karl Rhoads	Dem	Honolulu	Liliha, Pālama, Iwilei, Nuʻuanu, Pacific Heights, Pauoa, Downtown, Chinatown, Dowsett Heights, Pu'unui	2016 (Note: Previously served in House from 2006 to 2016)
14	Donna Mercado Kim	Dem	Honolulu	Moanalua, ʻAiea, Fort Shafter, Kalihi Valley, Red Hill, Kapalama	2000 (Note: Previously served in House from 1982 to 1985)
15	Glenn Wakai	Dem	Honolulu	Kalihi, Māpunapuna, Airport, Salt Lake, Āliamanu, Foster Village, Hickam, Pearl Harbor, Aiea, Pearl City	2010 (Note: Previously served in House from 2002 to 2010)
16	Brandon Elefante	Dem	Honolulu	Pearl City, Momilani, Pearlridge, ʻAiea, Royal Summit, ʻAiea Heights, Newtown, Waimalu, Hālawa, Pearl Harbor, Waiau, Pacific Palisades	2022
17	Donovan Dela Cruz	Dem	Honolulu	Mililani Town, Mililani Mauka, Waipi'o Acres, Launani Valley, Wahiawa, Whitmore Village	2010
18	Vacant (Note: Democrat Michelle Kidani resigned on June 30, 2026.)	Dem	Honolulu	Mililani Town, Waipiʻo Gentry, Crestview, Waikele, Village Park, Royal Kunia	
19	Rachele Lamosao (Note: Democrat Henry Aquino resigned on November 30, 2025. State representative Rachele Lamosao was appointed on December 3, 2025 to fill the seat.)	Dem	Honolulu	Pearl City, Waipahu, West Loch Estates, Hono'ui'uli, Ho'opii	2025 (Note: Previously served in House from 2022 to 2026)
20	Kurt Fevella	Rep	Honolulu	ʻEwa Beach, Ocean Pointe, ʻEwa by Gentry, Iroquois Point, ʻEwa Village	2018
21	Mike Gabbard	Dem	Honolulu	Kalaeloa, Fernandez Village, ʻEwa, Kapolei, Makakilo,	2006
22	Samantha DeCorte	Rep	Honolulu	Honokai Hale, Ko 'Olina, Nanakuli, Maili, Waianae, Makaha, Makua	2024
23	Brenton Awa	Rep	Honolulu	Kane'ohe, Kahaluu thru Laie, Kahuku to Mokuleia, Schofield Barracks, Kunia Camp	2022
24	Jarrett Keohokalole	Dem	Honolulu	Kāneʻohe, Kailua	2018 (Note: Previously served in House from 2014 to 2018)
25	Chris Lee	Dem	Honolulu	Kailua, Waimānalo, Hawaiʻi Kai	2020 (Note: Previously served in House from 2008 to 2020)

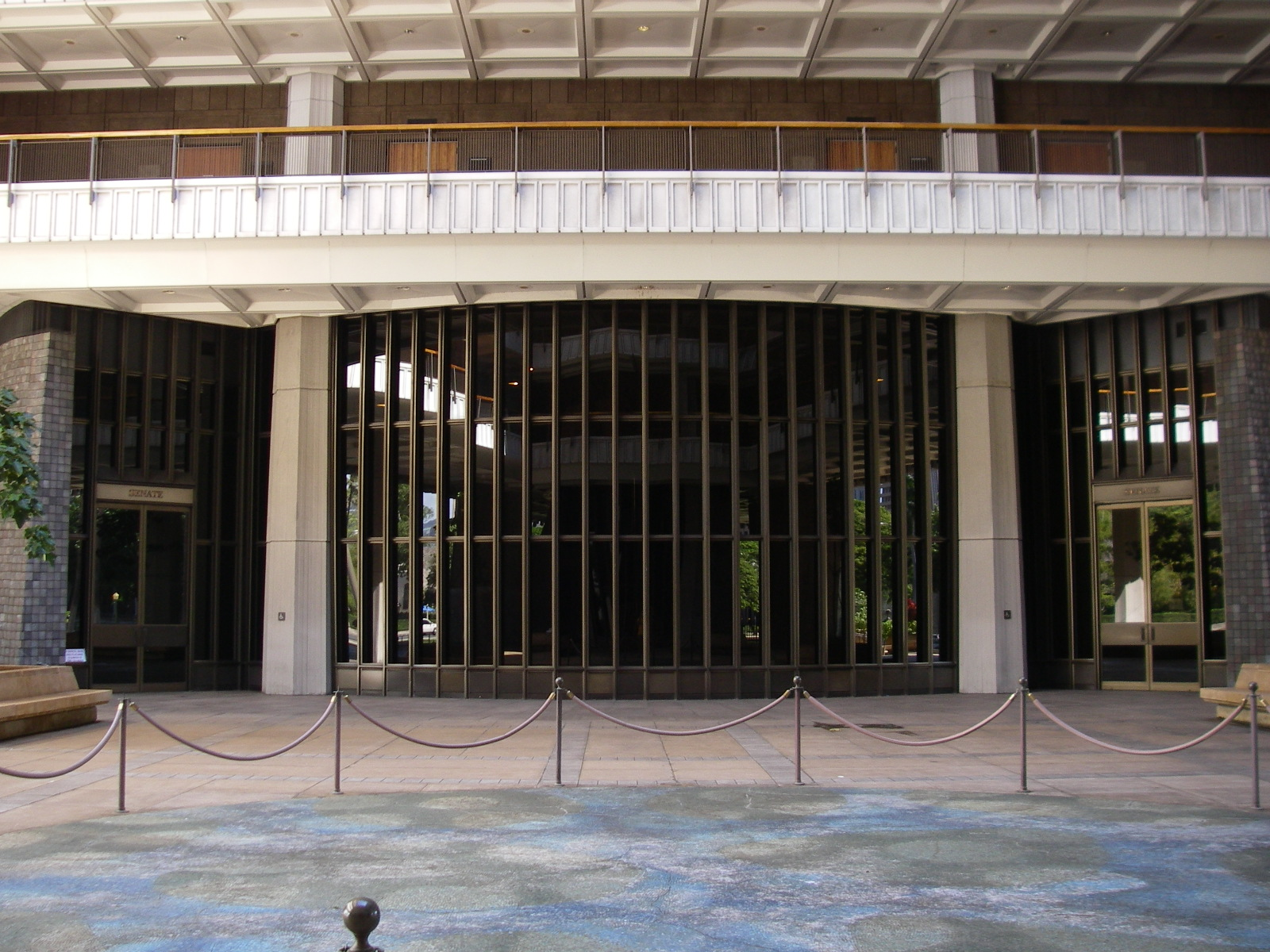
Entrance to the Hawaii State Senate chamber

== Idaho ==
District	Name	Party	Residence	Counties	Start
1	Jim Woodward	Republican	Sagle	Bonner, Boundary	2024
2	Phil Hart	Republican	Kellogg	Benewah, Bonner, Clearwater, Kootenai, Shoshone	2022
3	Doug Okuniewicz	Republican	Hayden	Kootenai	2022
4	Ben Toews	Republican	Coeur d'Alene	Kootenai	2022
5	Carl Bjerke	Republican	Coeur d'Alene	Kootenai	2022
6	Dan Foreman	Republican	Viola	Latah, Lewis, Nez Perce	2022
7	Cindy Carlson	Republican	Riggins	Adams, Idaho, Nez Perce	2022
8	Christy Zito	Republican	Hammett	Boise, Custer, Elmore, Valley	2024
9	Brandon Shippy	Republican	New Plymouth	Canyon, Payette, Washington	2024
10	Tammy Nichols	Republican	Middleton	Ada, Canyon	2022
11	Camille Blaylock	Republican	Caldwell	Canyon	2024
12	Ben Adams	Republican	Nampa	Canyon	2022
13	Brian Lenney	Republican	Nampa	Canyon	2022
14	C. Scott Grow	Republican	Eagle	Ada, Gem	2018
15	Codi Galloway	Republican	Boise	Ada	2024
16	Alison Rabe	Democratic	Boise	Ada	2022
17	Carrie Semmelroth	Democratic	Boise	Ada	2021
18	Janie Ward-Engelking	Democratic	Boise	Ada	2013
19	Melissa Wintrow	Democratic	Boise	Ada	2020
20	Josh Keyser	Republican	Boise	Ada	2024
21	Treg Bernt	Republican	Meridian	Ada	2022
22	Lori Den Hartog	Republican	Meridian	Ada	2014
23	Todd Lakey	Republican	Nampa	Ada, Canyon, Owyhee	2012
24	Glenneda Zuiderveld	Republican	Twin Falls	Camas, Gooding, Twin Falls	2022
25	Josh Kohl	Republican	Twin Falls	Twin Falls	2024
26	Ron Taylor	Democratic	Hailey	Blaine, Jerome, Lincoln	2022
27	Kelly Anthon	Republican	Declo	Cassia, Minidoka, Oneida	2015
28	Jim Guthrie	Republican	McCammon	Bannock, Franklin, Power	2012
29	James Ruchti	Democratic	Pocatello	Bannock	2022
30	Julie VanOrden	Republican	Pingree	Bingham, Butte	2022
31	Van Burtenshaw	Republican	Terreton	Clark, Fremont, Jefferson, Lemhi	2018
32	Kevin Cook	Republican	Idaho Falls	Bonneville	2020
33	Dave Lent	Republican	Idaho Falls	Bonneville	2018
34	Doug Ricks	Republican	Rexburg	Madison	2020
35	Mark Harris	Republican	Soda Springs	Bannock, Bear Lake, Bonneville, Caribou, Teton	2015

== Illinois ==
In 1924, Florence Fifer Bohrer became the body's first female member and Adelbert H. Roberts became its first African American member. In 1977, Earlean Collins became the first African American woman to serve in the Illinois Senate. Barack Obama, later the first African-American President of the United States, served in the Illinois Senate from 1997 to 2004.

As of February 28, 2025, the 104th General Assembly of the Illinois Senate consists of the following members:

District	Name	Party	Residence	Start	Next Election
1	Javier Cervantes (Note: Appointed after being elected, but prior to inauguration day of the General Assembly to which they were elected.)	Democratic	Chicago	November 18, 2022	2028
2	Omar Aquino (Note: Appointed prior to their initial election.)	Democratic	Chicago	July 1, 2016	2026
3	Mattie Hunter	Democratic	Chicago	January 8, 2003	2026
4	Kimberly Lightford	Democratic	Chicago	November 20, 1998	2028
5	Lakesia Collins	Democratic	Chicago	August 16, 2023	2026
6	Sara Feigenholtz	Democratic	Chicago	January 21, 2020	2026
7	Mike Simmons	Democratic	Chicago	February 6, 2021	2028
8	Ram Villivalam	Democratic	Chicago	January 5, 2019	2026
9	Laura Fine	Democratic	Glenview	January 6, 2019	2026
10	Robert Martwick	Democratic	Chicago	June 28, 2019	2028
11	Mike Porfirio	Democratic	Bridgeview	January 11, 2023	2026
12	Celina Villanueva	Democratic	Chicago	January 7, 2020	2026
13	Robert Peters	Democratic	Chicago	January 6, 2019	2028
14	Emil Jones III	Democratic	Chicago	January 14, 2009	2026
15	Napoleon Harris	Democratic	Harvey	January 9, 2013	2026
16	Willie Preston	Democratic	Chicago	January 11, 2023	2028
17	Elgie Sims	Democratic	Chicago	January 26, 2018	2026
18	William Cunningham	Democratic	Chicago	January 9, 2013	2026
19	Michael Hastings	Democratic	Tinley Park	January 9, 2013	2028
20	Graciela Guzmán	Democratic	Chicago	January 8, 2025	2026
21	Laura Ellman	Democratic	Lisle	January 9, 2019	2026
22	Cristina Castro	Democratic	Elgin	January 11, 2017	2028
23	Suzy Glowiak	Democratic	Western Springs	January 9, 2019	2026
24	Seth Lewis	Republican	Bartlett	January 11, 2023	2026
25	Karina Villa	Democratic	West Chicago	January 13, 2021	2028
26	Darby Hills	Republican	Barrington Hills	February 28, 2025	2026
27	Mark L. Walker	Democratic	Arlington Heights	May 11, 2024	2026
28	Laura Murphy	Democratic	Des Plaines	October 5, 2015	2028
29	Julie Morrison	Democratic	Deerfield	January 9, 2013	2026
30	Adriane Johnson	Democratic	Buffalo Grove	October 11, 2020	2026
31	Mary Edly-Allen	Democratic	Libertyville	January 11, 2023	2028
32	Craig Wilcox	Republican	McHenry	October 1, 2018	2026
33	Don DeWitte	Republican	St. Charles	January 9, 2019	2026
34	Steve Stadelman	Democratic	Rockford	January 9, 2013	2028
35	Dave Syverson	Republican	Rockford	January 13, 1993	2026
36	Michael Halpin	Democratic	Rock Island	January 11, 2023	2026
37	Li Arellano Jr.	Republican	Dixon	January 8, 2025	2028
38	Sue Rezin	Republican	Morris	December 11, 2010	2026
39	Don Harmon	Democratic	Oak Park	January 8, 2003	2026
40	Patrick Joyce	Democratic	Kankakee	November 8, 2019	2028
41	John Curran	Republican	Woodridge	July 23, 2017	2026
42	Linda Holmes	Democratic	Aurora	January 10, 2007	2026
43	Rachel Ventura	Democratic	Joliet	January 11, 2023	2028
44	Sally Turner	Republican	Beason	January 25, 2021	2026
45	Andrew Chesney	Republican	Freeport	December 5, 2018	2026
46	Dave Koehler	Democratic	Peoria	December 3, 2006	2028
47	Neil Anderson	Republican	Andalusia	January 15, 2015	2026
48	Doris Turner	Democratic	Springfield	February 6, 2021	2026
49	Meg Loughran Cappel	Democratic	Shorewood	December 10, 2020	2028
50	Jil Tracy	Republican	Quincy	January 11, 2017	2026
51	Chapin Rose	Republican	Mahomet	January 9, 2013	2026
52	Paul Faraci	Democratic	Champaign	January 11, 2023	2028
53	Chris Balkema	Republican	Channahon	January 8, 2025	2026
54	Steve McClure	Republican	Springfield	January 9, 2019	2026
55	Jason Plummer	Republican	Edwardsville	January 9, 2019	2028
56	Erica Harriss	Republican	Glen Carbon	January 11, 2023	2026
57	Christopher Belt	Democratic	Cahokia Heights	January 9, 2019	2026
58	Terri Bryant	Republican	Murphysboro	January 13, 2021	2028
59	Paul Jacobs	Republican	Pomona	June 17, 2026	2026

== Indiana ==
District	Name	Party	Residence	Start	Next Election
1	Dan Dernulc	Rep	Highland	2022	2026
2	Lonnie Randolph (Note: Randolph previously served in the state senate from 1992 to 1998.)	Dem	East Chicago	2008	2028
3	Mark Spencer	Dem	Gary	2024	2028
4	Rodney Pol Jr.	Dem	Chesterton	2021 (Note: Member was originally appointed or won the seat in a special election.)	2026
5	Ed Charbonneau	Rep	Valparaiso	2007	2028
6	Rick Niemeyer	Rep	Lowell	2014	2026
7	Brian Buchanan	Rep	Lebanon	2018	2028
8	Mike Bohacek	Rep	Michiana Shores	2016	2028
9	Ryan Mishler	Rep	Bremen	2004	2028
10	David L. Niezgodski	Dem	South Bend	2016	2028
11	Linda Rogers	Rep	Granger	2018	2026
12	Blake Doriot	Rep	New Paris	2016	2028
13	Sue Glick	Rep	LaGrange	2010	2028
14	Tyler Johnson	Rep	Grabill	2022	2026
15	Liz Brown	Rep	Fort Wayne	2014	2026
16	Justin Busch	Rep	Fort Wayne	2018	2028
17	Nick McKinley	Rep	Marion	2026	2026
18	Stacey Donato	Rep	Logansport	2019	2028
19	Travis Holdman	Rep	Markle	2008	2026
20	Scott Baldwin	Rep	Noblesville	2020	2028
21	Jim Buck	Rep	Kokomo	2008	2026
22	Ron Alting	Rep	Lafayette	1998	2026
23	Spencer Deery	Rep	West Lafayette	2022	2026
24	Brett Clark	Rep	Avon	2024	2028
25	Mike Gaskill	Rep	Anderson	2018	2026
26	Scott Alexander	Rep	Muncie	2022	2026
27	Jeff Raatz	Rep	Centerville	2014	2026
28	Michael Crider	Rep	Greenfield	2012	2028
29	J. D. Ford	Dem	Carmel	2018	2026
30	Fady Qaddoura	Dem	Indianapolis	2020	2028
31	Kyle Walker	Rep	Indianapolis	2020	2026
32	Aaron Freeman	Rep	Indianapolis	2016	2028
33	Greg Taylor	Dem	Indianapolis	2008	2028
34	La Keisha Jackson	Dem	Indianapolis	2024	2028
35	R. Michael Young	Rep (Note: Young is currently not a member of the Republican caucus but maintains his Republican affiliation.)	Indianapolis	2000	2028
36	Cyndi Carrasco	Rep	Indianapolis	2023	2028
37	Rodric Bray	Rep	Martinsville	2012	2028
38	Greg Goode	Rep	Terre Haute	2023	2026
39	Eric Bassler	Rep	Washington	2014	2026
40	Shelli Yoder	Dem	Bloomington	2020	2028
41	Greg Walker	Rep	Columbus	2006	2026
42	Jean Leising (Note: Leising previously served in the state senate from 1988 to 1996.)	Rep	Oldenburg	2008	2028
43	Randy Maxwell	Rep	Guilford	2023	2026
44	Eric Koch	Rep	Bedford	2016	2028
45	Chris Garten	Rep	Charlestown	2018	2026
46	Andrea Hunley	Dem	Indianapolis	2022	2026
47	Gary Byrne	Rep	Salem	2022	2026
48	Daryl Schmitt	Rep	Jasper	2024	2026
49	Jim Tomes	Rep	Evansville	2010	2026
50	Vaneta Becker	Rep	Evansville	2005	2028

== Iowa ==
Iowa senators as of December 30, 2025
District	Name		Party	Counties	Start	Standing committee leader	Appropriations subcommittee member
1		Catelin Drey	Democratic	Woodbury	2025 (Note: First elected in an August 26, 2025 special election.)		
2		Jeff Taylor	Republican	Plymouth and Sioux	2020	Education (Vice Chair)	Education (Chair)
3		Lynn Evans	Republican	Osceola, O'Brien, Clay, Cherokee, and Buena Vista	2022		Education
4		Tim Kraayenbrink	Republican	Calhoun, Pocahontas, Sac, and Webster	2014	Appropriations (Chair), Technology (Vice Chair)	
5		Dave Rowley	Republican	Clay, Dickinson, Emmet, Kossuth, Palo Alto, and Winnebago	2020		Administration and Regulation Appropriations (Chair)
6		Jason Schultz	Republican	Audubon, Carroll, Crawford, Ida, and Shelby	2014	State Government (Chair)	
7		Kevin Alons	Republican	Cherokee, Monona, Plymouth, and Woodbury	2022		Health and Human Services
8		Mark Costello	Republican	Fremont, Harrison, Mills, and Pottawattamie	2014 (Note: First elected in a December 30, 2014 special election.)	Ethics (Vice Chair)	Health and Human Services (Chair)
9		Tom Shipley	Republican	Adams, Cass, Montgomery, Page, Ringgold, Taylor, and Union	2014	Ethics (Chair), Natural Resources and Environment (Vice Chair)	Agriculture and Natural Resources
10		Dan Dawson	Republican	Pottawattamie	2016	Ways and Means (Chair)	
11		Vacant		Marion and Warren			
12		Amy Sinclair	Republican	Adair, Appanoose, Clarke, Dallas, Decatur, Lucas, Madison, Union, and Wayne	2012	Government Oversight (Chair), Rules and Administration (Vice Chair)	
13		Cherielynn Westrich	Republican	Appanoose, Davis, Monroe, and Wapello	2022		Justice System (Vice Chair)
14		Sarah Trone Garriott	Democratic	Dallas	2020	Health and Human Services (Ranking Member)	Health and Human Services
15		Tony Bisignano	Democratic	Polk	2014	State Government (Ranking Member), Agriculture (Ranking Member)	
16		Renee Hardman	Democratic	Dallas and Polk	2025 (Note: First elected in a December 30, 2025 special election)		
17		Izaah Knox	Democratic	Polk	2022	Natural Resources and Environment (Ranking Member)	Education
18	Official Portrait for the 85th General Assembly	Janet Petersen	Democratic	Polk	2012	Appropriations (Ranking Member)	Transportation, Infrastructure, and Capitals (Ranking Member)
19	Official Portrait for the 85th General Assembly	Ken Rozenboom	Republican	Jasper, Mahaska, and Marion	2012	Agriculture (Vice Chair), Education (Chair)	
20		Mike Pike	Republican	Polk	2024		
21		Mike Bousselot	Republican	Polk	2022	Commerce (Vice Chair)	Transportation, Infrastructure, and Capitals (Vice Chair)
22		Matt Blake	Democratic	Polk	2024		
23	Official Portrait for the 85th General Assembly	Jack Whitver	Republican	Dallas and Polk	2011 (Note: First elected in a January 18, 2011 special election.)	Rules and Administration (Chair)	
24		Jesse Green	Republican	Boone, Dallas, Greene, Guthrie, and Story	2020	Local Government (Chair)	
25	Official Portrait for the 85th General Assembly	Herman Quirmbach	Democratic	Story	2002	Education (Ranking Member)	Economic Development
26		Kara Warme	Republican	Marshall and Story	2024		
27		Annette Sweeney	Republican	Black Hawk, Grundy, Hardin, Poweshiek, and Tama	2018	Natural Resources and Environment (Chair)	Agriculture and Natural Resources (Vice Chair)
28	Official Portrait for the 85th General Assembly	Dennis Guth	Republican	Franklin, Hancock, Hamilton, Humbolt, and Wright	2012	N/A	Administration and Regulation (Vice Chair)
29		Sandy Salmon	Republican	Bremer, Butler, Chickasaw, and Floyd	2022	Veterans Affairs (Vice Chair)	Justice System
30		Doug Campbell	Republican	Cerro Gordo, Floyd, Mitchell, and Worth	2024		
31	Official Portrait for the 85th General Assembly	William Dotzler	Democratic	Black Hawk	2002	Veterans Affairs (Ranking Member)	Economic Development (Ranking Member)
32		Mike Klimesh	Republican	Allamakee, Clayton, Fayette, Howard, and Winneshiek	2020	Government Oversight (Vice Chair); Transportation (Chair)	Health and Human Services
33		Carrie Koelker	Republican	Dubuque, Jones, and Jackson	2018	Was and Means (Vice Chair)	Transportation, Infrastructure, and Capitals (Chair)
34	Official Portrait for the 85th General Assembly	Dan Zumbach	Republican	Black Hawk, Buchanan, Delaware, Dubuque, and Fayette	2012	Appropriations(Vice Chair)	Agriculture and Natural Resources (Chair)
35		Mike Zimmer	Democratic	Clinton, Jackson, and Scott	2025 (Note: First elected in a January 28, 2025 special election.)		
36		Thomas Townsend	Democratic	Dubuque	2024		
37		Molly Donahue	Democratic	Linn	2022	Workforce (Ranking Member)	Health and Human Services (Ranking Member)
38		Dave Sires	Republican	Benton, Black Hawk, and Tama	2024		
39		Liz Bennett	Democratic	Linn	2022	Technology (Ranking Member)	Transportation, Infrastructure, and Capitals
40		Art Staed	Democratic	Linn	2024		
41		Kerry Gruenhagen	Republican	Cedar, Muscatine, and Scott	2022		Economic Development
42		Charlie McClintock	Republican	Benton and Linn	2022	Workforce (Vice Chair)	Justice System
43		Zach Wahls	Democratic	Johnson	2018	Rules and Administration (Ranking Member)	
44		Adrian Dickey	Republican	Henry, Jefferson, Keokuk, Mahaska, and Van Buren	2021 (Note: First elected in a January 26, 2021 special election.)	Workforce (Chair); Transportation (Vice Chair)	Economic Development
45		Janice Weiner	Democratic	Johnson	2022	Local Government (Ranking Member)	Agriculture and Natural Resources
46		Dawn Driscoll	Republican	Iowa, Johnson. and Washington	2020	Agriculture (Chair)	
47		Scott Webster	Republican	Scott	2022		Administration and Regulation
48		Mark Lofgren	Republican	Des Moines, Henry, Louisa, and Muscatine	2016	Local Government (Vice Chair)	Economic Development (Chair)
49		Cindy Winckler	Democratic	Scott	2022	Ethics (Ranking Member)	Education (Ranking Member)
50		Jeff Reichman	Republican	Des Moines and Lee	2020	Veterans Affairs (Chair)	

== Kansas ==
District	Name	Party	Start	Residence	Counties
1	Craig Bowser	Republican	2025	Holton	Atchison, Brown, Doniphan, Jackson, Jefferson, Leavenworth, Marshall, Nemaha
2	Marci Francisco	Democratic	2005	Lawrence	Douglas
3	Rick Kloos	Republican	2021	Berryton	Douglas, Franklin, Osage, Shawnee
4	David Haley	Democratic	2001	Kansas City	Wyandotte
5	Jeff Klemp	Republican	2025	Lansing	Leavenworth, Wyandotte
6	Pat Pettey	Democratic	2013	Kansas City	Johnson, Wyandotte
7	Ethan Corson	Democratic	2021	Prairie Village	Johnson
8	Cindy Holscher	Democratic	2021	Overland Park	Johnson
9	Beverly Gossage	Republican	2021	Eudora	Douglas, Johnson, Leavenworth, Wyandotte
10	Mike Thompson	Republican	2020	Shawnee	Johnson
11	Kellie Warren	Republican	2021	Leawood	Johnson
12	Caryn Tyson	Republican	2013	Parker	Allen, Anderson, Coffey, Franklin, Linn, Miami, Wilson, Woodson
13	Tim Shallenburger	Republican	2023	Baxter Springs	Bourbon, Cherokee, Crawford
14	Michael Fagg	Republican	2021	El Dorado	Butler, Chase, Greenwood, Marion, McPherson
15	Virgil Peck Jr.	Republican	2021	Havana	Chautauqua, Elk, Labette, Montgomery, Neosho
16	Ty Masterson	Republican	2009	Andover	Butler, Sedgwick
17	Mike Argabright	Republican	2025	Olpe	Geary, Lyon, Morris
18	Kenny Titus	Republican	2025	Wamego	Jefferson, Pottawatomie, Shawnee
19	Patrick Schmidt	Democratic	2025	Topeka	Douglas, Shawnee
20	Brenda Dietrich	Republican	2021	Topeka	Shawnee, Wabaunsee
21	Dinah Sykes	Democratic	2017	Lenexa	Johnson
22	Brad Starnes	Republican	2025	Riley	Riley
23	Adam Thomas	Republican	2025	Olathe	Johnson, Miami
24	Scott Hill	Republican	2025	Abilene	Dickinson, Saline
25	Silas Miller	Democratic	2025	Wichita	Sedgwick
26	Chase Blasi	Republican	2023	Wichita	Sedgwick
27	Joe Claeys	Republican	2025	Maize	Sedgwick
28	Mike Petersen	Republican	2005	Wichita	Sedgwick
29	Oletha Faust-Goudeau	Democratic	2009	Wichita	Sedgwick
30	Renee Erickson	Republican	2021	Wichita	Sedgwick, Sumner
31	Stephen Owens	Republican	2025	Hesston	Harvey, Sedgwick
32	Larry Alley	Republican	2017	Winfield	Butler, Cowley, Harper, Sumner
33	Tory Marie Blew	Republican	2025	Great Bend	Barton, Comanche, Edwards, Ellsworth, Kiowa, Ness, Pawnee, Pratt, Rice, Rush, Stafford
34	Michael Murphy	Republican	2025	Sylvia	Barber, Kingman, Reno
35	T. J. Rose	Republican	2025	Olathe	Johnson
36	Elaine Bowers	Republican	2013	Concordia	Clay, Cloud, Jewell, Lincoln, Marshall, Mitchell, Osborne, Ottawa, Phillips, Republic, Rooks, Russell, Smith, Washington
37	Doug Shane	Republican	2025	Louisburg	Johnson, Miami
38	Ron Ryckman Sr.	Republican	2021	Meade	Clark, Ford, Gray, Haskell, Hodgeman, Meade, Seward
39	Bill Clifford	Republican	2025	Garden City	Finney, Grant, Greeley, Hamilton, Kearny, Lane, Morton, Scott, Stanton, Stevens, Wichita
40	Rick Billinger	Republican	2017	Goodland	Cheyenne, Decatur, Ellis, Gove, Graham, Logan, Norton, Phillips, Rawlins, Sheridan, Sherman, Thomas, Trego, Wallace

== Kentucky ==
District	Name	Party	First elected	Residence	Counties
1	Jason Howell	Republican	2020	Murray	Calloway, Crittenden, Fulton, Graves, Hickman, Lyon, Trigg
2	Danny Carroll	Republican	2014	Benton	Ballard, Carlisle, Livingston, Marshall, McCracken
3	Craig Richardson	Republican	2024	Hopkinsville	Caldwell, Christian, Muhlenberg
4	Robby Mills	Republican	2018	Henderson	Henderson, Hopkins, Union, Webster
5	Stephen Meredith	Republican	2016	Leitchfield	Breckinridge, Butler, Grayson, Meade, Ohio
6	Lindsey Tichenor	Republican	2022	Smithfield	Jefferson (Part), Oldham, Trimble
7	Aaron Reed	Republican	2024	Shelbyville	Anderson, Henry, Jefferson (Part), Shelby
8	Gary Boswell	Republican	2022	Owensboro	Daviess, Hancock, McLean
9	David P. Givens	Republican	2008	Greensburg	Barren, Edmondson, Green, Hart, Warren (Part)
10	Matthew Deneen	Republican	2022	Elizabethtown	Hardin, Jefferson (Part)
11	Steve Rawlings	Republican	2024	Burlington	Boone (Part)
12	Amanda Mays Bledsoe	Republican	2022	Lexington	Boyle, Fayette (Part), Mercer, Woodford
13	Reginald L. Thomas	Democratic	2013 (Note: Elected in a special election.)	Lexington	Fayette (Part)
14	Jimmy Higdon	Republican	2009	Lebanon	Larue, Marion, Nelson, Spencer, Washington
15	Rick Girdler	Republican	2016	Somerset	Clinton, Cumberland, Pulaski, Russell, Wayne
16	Max Wise	Republican	2014	Campbellsville	Adair, Allen, Metcalfe, Monroe, Taylor, Warren (Part)
17	Matt Nunn	Republican	2024	Sadieville	Fayette (Part), Grant, Kenton (Part), Scott
18	Robin L. Webb	Republican	2009 (Note: Originally a member of the Democratic Party, Webb became a Republican in 2025.)	Grayson	Boyd, Carter, Greenup, Lewis
19	Cassie Chambers Armstrong	Democratic	2023	Louisville	Jefferson (Part)
20	Gex Williams	Republican	2022 (Note: Williams previously served in the senate from 1993 to 1999.)	Verona	Boone (Part), Carroll, Franklin, Gallatin, Kenton (Part), Owen
21	Brandon J. Storm	Republican	2020	London	Casey, Laurel, Lincoln, Rockcastle
22	Donald Douglas	Republican	2021	Nicholasville	Fayette (Part), Garrard, Jessamine
23	Christian McDaniel	Republican	2012	Ryland Heights	Kenton (Part)
24	Shelley Funke Frommeyer	Republican	2022	Alexandria	Bracken, Campbell, Kenton (Part), Pendleton
25	Robert Stivers	Republican	1996	Manchester	Clay, Jackson, Knox, McCreary, Owsley, Whitley
26	Karen Berg	Democratic	2020	Louisville	Jefferson (Part)
27	Steve West	Republican	2015	Paris	Bourbon, Fayette (Part), Fleming, Harrison, Mason, Nicholas, Robertson, Rowan
28	Greg Elkins	Republican	2023	Winchester	Bath, Clark, Fayette (Part), Menifee, Montgomery
29	Scott Madon	Republican	2024	Pineville	Bell, Floyd, Harlan, Knott, Letcher
30	Brandon Smith	Republican	2008	Hazard	Breathitt, Estill, Lee, Leslie, Magoffin, Morgan, Perry, Powell, Wolfe
31	Phillip Wheeler	Republican	2019	Pikeville	Elliott, Johnson, Lawrence, Martin, Pike
32	Mike Wilson	Republican	2010	Bowling Green	Logan, Simpson, Todd, Warren (Part)
33	Gerald A. Neal	Democratic	1988	Louisville	Jefferson (Part)
34	Jared Carpenter	Republican	2010	Berea	Fayette (Part), Madison
35	Keturah J. Herron	Democratic	2024	Louisville	Jefferson (Part)
36	Julie Raque Adams	Republican	2014	Louisville	Jefferson (Part)
37	Gary Clemons	Democratic	2025	Louisville	Jefferson (Part)
38	Michael J. Nemes	Republican	2020	Shepherdsville	Bullitt, Jefferson (Part)

== Louisiana ==
District	Name	Party	District Office(s)	Start	Term Limited
1	Bob Owen	Rep	Slidell; Chalmette	2023	No
2	Ed Price	Dem	Gonzales	2017	Yes
3	Sidney Barthelemy II	Dem	New Orleans	2026	No
4	Jimmy Harris	Dem	New Orleans	2019	No
5	Royce Duplessis	Dem	New Orleans	2022	No
6	Rick Edmonds	Rep	Baton Rouge	2023	No
7	Gary Carter	Dem	New Orleans	2021	No
8	Patrick Connick	Rep	Marrero	2019	No
9	Cameron Henry	Rep	Metairie	2019	No
10	Kirk Talbot	Rep	River Ridge	2019	No
11	Patrick McMath	Rep	Covington	2019	No
12	Beth Mizell	Rep	Franklinton	2015	Yes
13	Valarie Hodges	Rep	Denham Springs	2023	No
14	Larry Selders	Dem	Baton Rouge	2025	No
15	Regina Barrow	Dem	Baton Rouge	2015	Yes
16	Franklin Foil	Rep	Baton Rouge	2019	No
17	Caleb Kleinpeter	Rep	Brusly	2022	No
18	Eddie J. Lambert	Rep	Prairieville	2015	Yes
19	Gregory A. Miller	Rep	Norco	2023	No
20	Mike Fesi	Rep	Houma	2019	No
21	Robert Allain III	Rep	Franklin	2023	No
22	Blake Miguez	Rep	New Iberia	2023	No
23	Brach Myers	Rep	Lafayette	2025	No
24	Gerald Boudreaux	Dem	Lafayette	2015	Yes
25	Mark Abraham	Rep	Lake Charles	2019	No
26	Bob Hensgens	Rep	Abbeville	2018	No
27	Jeremy Stine	Rep	Lake Charles	2021	No
28	Heather Cloud	Rep	Turkey Creek	2019	No
29	Jay Luneau	Dem	Alexandria	2015	Yes
30	Mike Reese	Rep	Leesville	2019	No
31	Alan Seabaugh	Rep	Shreveport	2023	No
32	Glen Womack	Rep	Harrisonburg	2019	No
33	Stewart Cathey Jr.	Rep	Monroe	2019	No
34	Katrina Jackson	Dem	Monroe	2019	No
35	Jay Morris	Rep	West Monroe	2019	No
36	Adam Bass	Rep	Bossier City	2023	No
37	Bill Wheat	Rep	Ponchatoula	2023	No
38	Thomas Pressly	Rep	Shreveport	2023	No
39	Sam Jenkins	Dem	Shreveport	2023	No

== Maine ==
Districts are currently numbered starting with 1 from north to south. While this is often reversed in the decennial redistricting, it was not reversed in the redistricting which occurred in 2021 and which went into effect beginning with the 2022 primary and general elections. The previous district lines, which were drawn in 2013 and were first used in the 2014 primary and general elections, were only in effect for 8 years rather than the usual 10 as Maine adjusted its legislative redistricting cycle to conform with most other states.

District	Name	Party	Mun. of residence	Cty. of residence	Start	Term limited
1	Susan Bernard	Rep	Caribou	Aroostook	2024	2032
2	Trey Stewart	Rep	Presque Isle	Aroostook	2020	2028
3	Brad Farrin	Rep	Norridgewock	Somerset	2018	2026
4	Stacey Guerin	Rep	Glenburn	Penobscot	2018	2026
5	Russell Black	Rep	Wilton	Franklin	2018	2026
6	Marianne Moore	Rep	Calais	Washington	2018	2026
7	Nicole Grohoski	Dem	Ellsworth	Hancock	2022 (Note: First won in a special election.)	2030
8	Mike Tipping	Dem	Orono	Penobscot	2022	2030
9	Joe Baldacci	Dem	Bangor	Penobscot	2020	2028
10	David Haggan	Rep	Hampden	Penobscot	2024	2032
11	Chip Curry	Dem	Belfast	Waldo	2020	2028
12	Pinny Beebe-Center	Dem	Rockland	Knox	2022	2030
13	Cameron Reny	Dem	Bristol	Lincoln	2022	2030
14	Craig Hickman	Dem	Winthrop	Kennebec	2021	2028
15	Richard Bradstreet	Rep	Vassalboro	Kennebec	2024	2032
16	Scott Cyrway (Note: Cyrway previously served in the state senate from 2014–2022.)	Rep	Albion	Kennebec	2024	2032
17	Jeff Timberlake	Rep	Turner	Androscoggin	2018	2026
18	Rick Bennett (Note: Bennett previously served in the state senate from 1996–2004.)	Ind (Note: Bennett served as a Republican until switching to Independent in 2025.)	Oxford	Oxford	2020	2028
19	Joseph Martin	Rep	Rumford	Oxford	2024	2032
20	Bruce Bickford	Rep	Auburn	Androscoggin	2024	2032
21	Peggy Rotundo	Dem	Lewiston	Androscoggin	2022	2030
22	James Libby (Note: Libby previously served in the state senate from 1996–2000.)	Rep	Standish	Cumberland	2022	2030
23	Mattie Daughtry	Dem	Brunswick	Cumberland	2020	2028
24	Denise Tepler	Dem	Topsham	Sagadahoc	2024	2032
25	Teresa Pierce	Dem	Falmouth	Cumberland	2022	2030
26	Tim Nangle	Dem	Windham	Cumberland	2022	2030
27	Jill Duson	Dem	Portland	Cumberland	2022	2030
28	Rachel Talbot Ross	Dem	Portland	Cumberland	2024	2032
29	Anne Carney	Dem	Cape Elizabeth	Cumberland	2020	2028
30	Stacy Brenner	Dem	Scarborough	Cumberland	2020	2028
31	Donna Bailey	Dem	Saco	York	2020	2028
32	Henry Ingwersen	Dem	Arundel	York	2022	2030
33	Matthew Harrington	Rep	Sanford	York	2022	2030
34	Joe Rafferty	Dem	Kennebunk	York	2020	2028
35	Mark Lawrence (Note: Lawrence previously served in the state senate from 1992–2000.)	Dem	Eliot	York	2018	2026

== Maryland ==
District	Name	Party	Start	Residence	Counties
1	Mike McKay	Republican	2023	Cumberland	Allegany, Garrett, Washington
2	Paul D. Corderman	Republican	2020	Hagerstown	Frederick, Washington
3	Karen Lewis Young	Democratic	2023	Frederick	Frederick
4	William Folden	Republican	2023	Myersville	Frederick
5	Justin Ready	Republican	2015	Manchester	Carroll
6	Johnny Ray Salling	Republican	2015	Essex	Baltimore County
7	J. B. Jennings	Republican	2011	Joppa	Baltimore County, Harford
8	Carl W. Jackson	Democratic	2025	Rosedale	Baltimore County
9	Katie Fry Hester	Democratic	2019	Ellicott City	Howard, Montgomery
10	Benjamin Brooks	Democratic	2023	Milford Mill	Baltimore County
11	Shelly L. Hettleman	Democratic	2020	Pikesville	Baltimore County
12	Clarence Lam	Democratic	2019	Columbia	Anne Arundel County, Howard
13	Guy Guzzone	Democratic	2015	Columbia	Howard
14	Craig Zucker	Democratic	2016	Brookeville	Montgomery
15	Brian Feldman	Democratic	2013	Potomac	Montgomery
16	Sara N. Love	Democratic	2024	Bethesda	Montgomery
17	Cheryl Kagan	Democratic	2015	Rockville	Montgomery
18	Jeff Waldstreicher	Democratic	2019	Kensington	Montgomery
19	Benjamin F. Kramer	Democratic	2019	Derwood	Montgomery
20	William C. Smith Jr.	Democratic	2016	Silver Spring	Montgomery
21	James Rosapepe	Democratic	2007	College Park	Anne Arundel, Prince George's
22	Alonzo T. Washington	Democratic	2023	Greenbelt	Prince George's
23	Ron Watson	Democratic	2021	Upper Marlboro	Prince George's
24	Joanne C. Benson	Democratic	2011	Landover	Prince George's
25	Nick Charles	Democratic	2023	Forestville	Prince George's
26	C. Anthony Muse	Democratic	2023	Accokeek	Prince George's
27	Kevin Harris	Democratic	2025	Brandywine	Calvert, Charles, Prince George's
28	Arthur Ellis	Democratic	2019	Indian Head	Charles
29	Jack Bailey	Republican	2019	Mechanicsville	Calvert, St. Mary's
30	Shaneka Henson	Democratic	2025	Annapolis	Anne Arundel
31	Bryan Simonaire	Republican	2007	Glen Burnie	Anne Arundel
32	Pamela Beidle	Democratic	2019	Linthicum	Anne Arundel
33	Dawn Gile	Democratic	2023	Severna Park	Anne Arundel
34	Mary-Dulany James	Democratic	2023	Havre de Grace	Harford
35	Jason C. Gallion	Republican	2019	Churchville	Cecil, Harford
36	Steve Hershey	Republican	2013	Queenstown	Caroline, Cecil, Kent, Queen Anne's
37	Johnny Mautz	Republican	2023	Saint Michaels	Caroline, Dorchester, Talbot, Wicomico
38	Mary Beth Carozza	Republican	2019	Ocean City	Somerset, Wicomico, Worcester
39	Nancy J. King	Democratic	2007	Montgomery Village	Montgomery
40	Antonio Hayes	Democratic	2019	Baltimore	Baltimore City
41	Dalya Attar	Democratic	2025	Baltimore	Baltimore City
42	Chris West	Republican	2019	Towson	Baltimore County, Carroll County
43	Mary L. Washington	Democratic	2019	Baltimore	Baltimore City, Baltimore County
44	Charles E. Sydnor III	Democratic	2020	Baltimore	Baltimore County
45	Cory V. McCray	Democratic	2019	Baltimore	Baltimore City
46	Bill Ferguson	Democratic	2011	Baltimore	Baltimore City
47	Malcolm L. Augustine	Democratic	2019	Cheverly	Prince George's

== Michigan ==
Senate districts and party affiliation as of May 2026

District	Name	Party	Residence	Start	Term Limited
1	Erika Geiss	Dem	Taylor	January 1, 2019	Yes
2	Sylvia Santana	Dem	Detroit	January 1, 2019	Yes
3	Stephanie Chang	Dem	Detroit	January 1, 2019	Yes
4	Darrin Camilleri	Dem	Brownstown	January 1, 2023	No
5	Dayna Polehanki	Dem	Livonia	January 1, 2019	No
6	Mary Cavanagh	Dem	Redford	January 1, 2023	No
7	Jeremy Moss	Dem	Southfield	January 1, 2019	Yes
8	Mallory McMorrow	Dem	Royal Oak	January 1, 2019	No
9	Michael Webber	Rep	Rochester Hills	January 1, 2023	No
10	Paul Wojno	Dem	Warren	January 1, 2019	Yes
11	Veronica Klinefelt	Dem	Eastpointe	January 1, 2023	No
12	Kevin Hertel	Dem	St. Clair Shores	January 1, 2023	No
13	Rosemary Bayer	Dem	Beverly Hills	January 1, 2019	No
14	Sue Shink	Dem	Ann Arbor	January 1, 2023	No
15	Jeff Irwin	Dem	Ann Arbor	January 1, 2019	Yes
16	Joe Bellino	Rep	Monroe	January 1, 2023	No
17	Jonathan Lindsey	Rep	Bronson	January 1, 2023	No
18	Thomas Albert	Rep	Lowell	January 1, 2023	No
19	Sean McCann	Dem	Kalamazoo	January 1, 2019	Yes
20	Aric Nesbitt	Rep	Porter Township	January 1, 2019	Yes
21	Sarah Anthony	Dem	Lansing	January 1, 2023	No
22	Lana Theis	Rep	Brighton Township	January 1, 2019	Yes
23	Jim Runestad	Rep	White Lake Township	January 1, 2019	Yes
24	Ruth Johnson	Rep	Holly	January 1, 2019	Yes
25	Dan Lauwers	Rep	Capac	January 1, 2019	Yes
26	Kevin Daley	Rep	Lum	January 1, 2019	Yes
27	John Daniel Cherry	Dem	Flint	January 1, 2023	No
28	Sam Singh	Dem	East Lansing	January 1, 2023	No
29	Winnie Brinks	Dem	Grand Rapids	January 1, 2019	Yes
30	Mark Huizenga	Rep	Walker	November 30, 2021	No
31	Roger Victory	Rep	Hudsonville	January 1, 2019	Yes
32	Jon Bumstead	Rep	Newaygo	January 1, 2019	Yes
33	Rick Outman	Rep	Six Lakes	January 1, 2019	Yes
34	Roger Hauck	Rep	Mount Pleasant	January 1, 2023	No
35	Chedrick Greene	Dem	Saginaw	May 21, 2026	No
36	Michele Hoitenga	Rep	Manton	January 1, 2023	No
37	John Damoose	Rep	Harbor Springs	January 1, 2023	No
38	Ed McBroom	Rep	Vulcan	January 1, 2019	Yes

== Minnesota ==
Senate districts Republican DFL

District	Name	Party	Residence	Start
1	Mark Johnson	Republican	East Grand Forks	2016
2	Steve Green	Republican	Fosston	2022
3	Grant Hauschild	DFL	Hermantown	2022
4	Rob Kupec	DFL	Moorhead	2022
5	Paul Utke	Republican	Park Rapids	2016
6	Keri Heintzeman	Republican	Nisswa	2025 (Note: Elected in a special election.)
7	Robert Farnsworth	Republican	Hibbing	2022
8	Jen McEwen	DFL	Duluth	2020
9	Jordan Rasmusson	Republican	Fergus Falls	2022
10	Nathan Wesenberg	Republican	Little Falls	2022
11	Jason Rarick	Republican	Pine City	2019
12	Torrey Westrom	Republican	Alexandria	2012
13	Jeff Howe	Republican	Rockville	2018
14	Aric Putnam	DFL	St. Cloud	2020
15	Gary Dahms	Republican	Redwood Falls	2010
16	Andrew Lang	Republican	Olivia	2016
17	Glenn Gruenhagen	Republican	Glencoe	2022
18	Nick Frentz	DFL	North Mankato	2016
19	John Jasinski	Republican	Faribault	2016
20	Steve Drazkowski	Republican	Mazeppa	2022
21	Bill Weber	Republican	Luverne	2012
22	Rich Draheim	Republican	Madison Lake	2016
23	Gene Dornink	Republican	Hayfield	2020
24	Carla Nelson	Republican	Rochester	2010
25	Liz Boldon	DFL	Rochester	2022
26	Jeremy Miller	Republican	Winona	2010
27	Andrew Mathews	Republican	Milaca	2016
28	Mark Koran	Republican	North Branch	2016
29	Michael Holmstrom Jr.	Republican	Buffalo	2025
30	Eric Lucero	Republican	Saint Michael	2022
31	Cal Bahr	Republican	East Bethel	2022
32	Michael Kreun	Republican	Blaine	2022
33	Karin Housley	Republican	Stillwater	2012
34	John Hoffman	DFL	Champlin	2012
35	Jim Abeler	Republican	Anoka	2016
36	Heather Gustafson	DFL	Vadnais Heights	2022
37	Warren Limmer	Republican	Maple Grove	1995
38	Susan Pha	DFL	Brooklyn Park	2022
39	Mary Kunesh	DFL	New Brighton	2020
40	John Marty	DFL	Roseville	1986
41	Judy Seeberger	DFL	Afton	2022
42	Bonnie Westlin	DFL	Plymouth	2022
43	Ann Rest	DFL	New Hope	2000
44	Tou Xiong	DFL	Maplewood	2022
45	Ann Johnson Stewart	DFL	Minnetonka	2024
46	Ron Latz	DFL	St. Louis Park	2006
47	Amanda Hemmingsen-Jaeger	DFL	Woodbury	2025
48	Julia Coleman	Republican	Chanhassen	2020
49	Steve Cwodzinski	DFL	Eden Prairie	2016
50	Alice Mann	DFL	Edina	2022
51	Melissa Halvorson Wiklund	DFL	Bloomington	2012
52	Jim Carlson (Note: Carlson previously served in the state senate from 2006–2010.)	DFL	Eagan	2012
53	Matt Klein	DFL	Mendota Heights	2016
54	Eric Pratt	Republican	Prior Lake	2012
55	Lindsey Port	DFL	Burnsville	2020
56	Erin Maye Quade	DFL	Apple Valley	2022
57	Zach Duckworth	Republican	Lakeville	2020
58	Bill Lieske	Republican	Lonsdale	2022
59	Bobby Joe Champion	DFL	Minneapolis	2012
60	Doron Clark	DFL	Minneapolis	2025
61	Scott Dibble	DFL	Minneapolis	2002
62	Omar Fateh	DFL	Minneapolis	2020
63	Zaynab Mohamed	DFL	Minneapolis	2022
64	Erin Murphy	DFL	Saint Paul	2020
65	Sandy Pappas	DFL	Saint Paul	1990
66	Clare Oumou Verbeten	DFL	Saint Paul	2022
67	Foung Hawj	DFL	Saint Paul	2012

== Mississippi ==
District	Name	Party	Start	Counties
1	Michael McLendon	Rep	2020	DeSoto, Tate
2	Theresa Gillespie Isom	Dem	2026	DeSoto, Tunica
3	Kathy Chism	Rep	2020	Benton, Marshall, Pontotoc, Prentiss, Union
4	Rita Potts Parks	Rep	2012	Alcorn, Tippah
5	Daniel Sparks	Rep	2020	Itawamba, Prentiss, Tishomingo
6	Chad McMahan	Rep	2016	Lee
7	Hob Bryan	Dem	1984	Itawamba, Lee, Monroe
8	Benjamin Suber	Rep	2020	Calhoun, Chickasaw, Lafayette, Pontotoc, Yalobusha
9	Nicole Akins Boyd	Rep	2020	Lafayette, Panola
10	Neil Whaley	Rep	2018	Lafayette, Marshall, Tate, Union
11	Reginald Jackson	Dem	2024	Coahoma, DeSoto, Quitman, Tate, Tunica
12	Derrick Simmons	Dem	2011	Bolivar, Coahoma, Washington
13	Sarita Simmons	Dem	2020	Bolivar, Sunflower, Tallahatchie
14	Lydia Chassaniol	Rep	2007	Attala, Carroll, Grenada, Leflore, Montgomery
15	Bart Williams	Rep	2020	Choctaw, Montgomery, Oktibbeha, Webster
16	Angela Turner-Ford	Dem	2013	Clay, Lowndes, Noxubee, Oktibbeha
17	Charles Younger	Rep	2014	Lowndes, Monroe, Oktibbeha
18	Lane Taylor	Rep	2025	Leake, Neshoba, Winston
19	Kevin Blackwell	Rep	2016	DeSoto
20	Josh Harkins	Rep	2012	Rankin
21	Bradford Blackmon	Dem	2024	Attala, Holmes, Leake, Madison
22	Joseph C. Thomas (Note: Thomas previously served in the state senate from 2004–2008.)	Dem	2020	Humphreys, Madison, Sharkey, Yazoo
23	Briggs Hopson	Rep	2008	Issaquena, Madison, Warren, Yazoo
24	Justin Pope	Dem	2026	Leflore, Panola, Tallahatchie
25	J. Walter Michel (Note: Michel previously served in the state senate from 1999–2011.)	Rep	2016	Hinds, Madison
26	Kamesha Mumford	Dem	2026	Hinds, Madison
27	Hillman Terome Frazier	Dem	1993	Hinds
28	Sollie Norwood	Dem	2013	Hinds
29	David Blount	Dem	2008	Hinds
30	Dean Kirby	Rep	1992	Rankin
31	Tyler McCaughn	Rep	2020	Lauderdale, Newton, Rankin, Scott
32	Rod Hickman	Dem	2021	Kemper, Lauderdale, Noxubee, Winston
33	Jeff Tate	Rep	2020	Clarke, Lauderdale
34	Juan Barnett	Dem	2016	Covington, Jasper, Jones
35	Andy Berry	Rep	2024	Copiah, Jefferson Davis, Lawrence, Simpson
36	Brian Rhodes	Rep	2024	Rankin, Smith
37	Albert Butler (Note: Butler represented in the 36th district from 2010–2024.)	Dem	2010	Adams, Claiborne, Copiah, Franklin, Hinds, Jefferson
38	Gary Brumfield	Dem	2024	Adams, Amite, Pike, Walthall, Wilkinson
39	Jason Barrett	Rep	2020	Amite, Franklin, Lawrence, Lincoln, Pike
40	Angela Burks Hill	Rep	2012	Pearl River, Stone
41	Joey Fillingane	Rep	2007	Covington, Lamar, Marion, Walthall
42	Don Hartness	Rep	2026	Forrest, Jones
43	Dennis DeBar	Rep	2016	George, Greene, Wayne
44	Chris Johnson	Rep	2020	Forrest, Lamar, Perry
45	Johnny DuPree	Dem	2026	Forrest
46	Philman Ladner	Rep	2024	Hancock, Harrison
47	Mike Seymour	Rep	2016	Harrison, Jackson, Stone
48	Mike Thompson	Rep	2020	Hancock, Harrison
49	Joel Carter	Rep	2018	Harrison
50	Scott DeLano	Rep	2020	Harrison
51	Jeremy England	Rep	2020	Jackson
52	Brice Wiggins	Rep	2012	Jackson

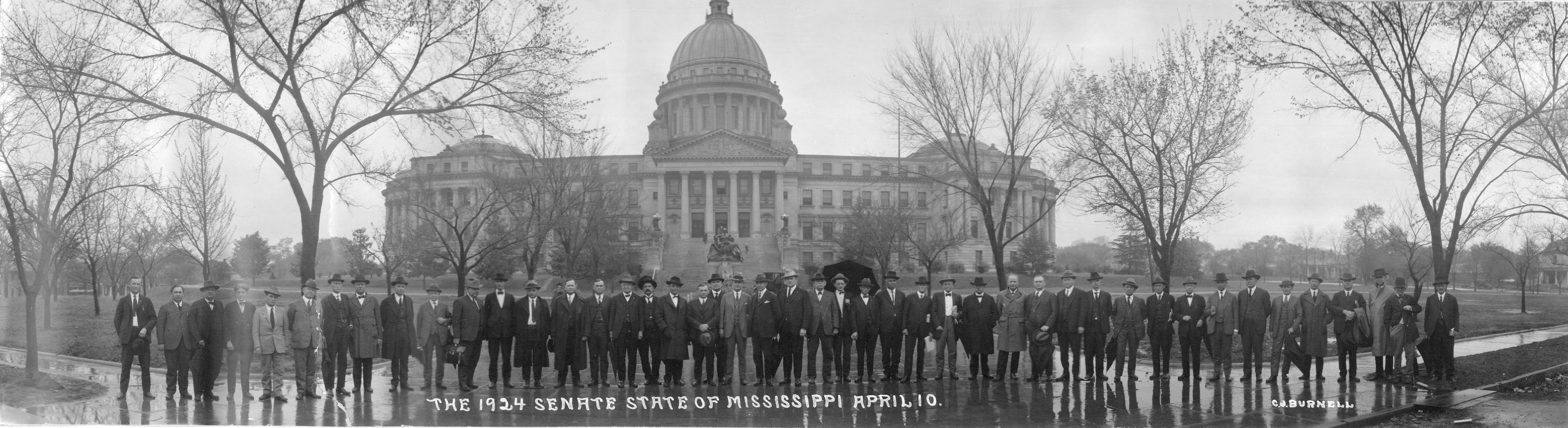

== Missouri ==
District	Name	Party	Residence	Start	Term Limited
1	Doug Beck	Democratic	Affton	2021	2029
2	Nick Schroer	Republican	Defiance	2023	2031
3	Mike Henderson	Republican	Desloge	2025	2033
4	Karla May	Democratic	St. Louis	2019	2027
5	Steve Roberts	Democratic	St. Louis	2021	2029
6	Mike Bernskoetter	Republican	Jefferson City	2019	2027
7	Patty Lewis	Democratic	Kansas City	2025	2033
8	Mike Cierpiot	Republican	Lee's Summit	2018 (Note: Elected in a special election.)	2027
9	Barbara Washington	Democratic	Kansas City	2021	2029
10	Vacant (Note: Republican Travis Fitzwater resigned on May 15, 2026)				
11	Joe Nicola	Republican	Grain Valley	2025	2033
12	Rusty Black	Republican	Chillicothe	2023	2031
13	Angela Mosley	Democratic	Florissant	2021	2029
14	Brian Williams	Democratic	University City	2019	2027
15	David Gregory	Republican	Chesterfield	2025	2033
16	Justin Brown	Republican	Rolla	2019	2027
17	Maggie Nurrenbern	Democratic	Kansas City	2025	2033
18	Cindy O'Laughlin	Republican	Shelbina	2019	2027
19	Stephen Webber	Democratic	Columbia	2025	2033
20	Curtis Trent	Republican	Battlefield	2023	2031
21	Kurtis Gregory	Republican	Marshall	2025	2033
22	Mary Elizabeth Coleman	Republican	Arnold	2023	2031
23	Adam Schnelting	Republican	St. Charles	2025	2033
24	Tracy McCreery	Democratic	Olivette	2023	2031
25	Jason Bean	Republican	Poplar Bluff	2021	2029
26	Ben Brown	Republican	Washington	2023	2031
27	Jamie Burger	Republican	Benton	2025	2033
28	Sandy Crawford	Republican	Buffalo	2017	2027
29	Mike Moon	Republican	Ash Grove	2021	2029
30	Lincoln Hough	Republican	Springfield	2019	2027
31	Rick Brattin	Republican	Lee's Summit	2021	2029
32	Jill Carter	Republican	Granby	2023	2031
33	Brad Hudson	Republican	Cape Fair	2025	2033
34	Tony Luetkemeyer	Republican	Parkville	2019	2027

== Montana ==
District	Name	Party	Residence	Start	Term Limited
1	Mike Cuffe	Rep	Eureka	2018	Yes
2	Dave Fern	Dem	Whitefish	2024	No
3	Carl Glimm	Rep	Kila	2020	No
4	John Fuller	Rep	Kalispell	2022	No
5	Matt Regier	Rep	Kalispell	2024	No
6	Mark Noland	Rep	Bigfork	2022	No
7	Greg Hertz	Rep	Polson	2020	No
8	Susan Webber	Dem	Browning	2018	Yes
9	Bruce Gillespie	Rep	Ethridge	2018	Yes
10	Jeremy Trebas	Rep	Great Falls	2022	No
11	Daniel Emrich	Rep	Great Falls	2022	No
12	Wendy McKamey	Rep	Great Falls	2022	No
13	Joshua Kassmier	Rep	Fort Benton	2024	No
14	Russel Tempel	Rep	Chester	2018	Yes
15	Gregg Hunter	Rep	Glasgow	2024	No
16	Jonathan Windy Boy	Dem	Box Elder	2024	No
17	Bob Phalen	Rep	Lindsay	2024	No
18	Kenneth Bogner	Rep	Miles City	2018	Yes
19	Barry Usher	Rep	Billings	2022	No
20	Sue Vinton	Rep	Billings	2024	No
21	Gayle Lammers	Rep	Hardin	2024	No
22	Daniel Zolnikov	Rep	Billings	2022	No
23	Emma Kerr-Carpenter	Dem	Billings	2024 (Note: Appointed.)	No
24	Mike Yakawich	Rep	Billings	2024	No
25	Dennis Lenz	Rep	Billings	2022	No
26	Tom McGillvray	Rep	Billings	2020	No
27	Vince Ricci	Rep	Billings	2024	No
28	Forrest Mandeville	Rep	Columbus	2022	No
29	John Esp	Rep	Big Timber	2018	Yes
30	Cora Neumann	Dem	Helena	2024	No
31	Pat Flowers	Dem	Belgrade	2018	Yes
32	Denise Hayman	Dem	Bozeman	2022	No
33	Christopher Pope	Dem	Bozeman	2020	No
34	Shelley Vance	Rep	Belgrade	2022	No
35	Tony Tezak	Rep	Ennis	2024	No
36	Sara Novak	Dem	Anaconda	2024	No
37	Derek Harvey	Dem	Butte	2024	No
38	Becky Beard	Rep	Elliston	2024	No
39	Wylie Galt	Rep	Martinsdale	2024	No
40	Laura Smith	Dem	Helena	2024	No
41	Janet Ellis	Dem	Helena	2018	Yes
42	Mary Ann Dunwell	Dem	Helena	2022	No
43	Jason Ellsworth	Rep	Hamilton	2018	Yes
44	Theresa Manzella	Rep	Hamilton	2020	No
45	Denley Loge	Rep	St. Regis	2024	No
46	Jacinda Morigeau	Dem	Arlee	2024	No
47	Ellie Boldman	Dem	Missoula	2020	No
48	Andrea Olsen	Dem	Missoula	2022	No
49	Willis Curdy	Dem	Missoula	2022	No
50	Shane Morigeau	Dem	Missoula	2022	No

== Nevada ==
Districts of the Nevada Assembly are nested inside the Senate districts, two per Senate district. The final Legislative redistricting plans as created by the Special Masters in 2011 and approved by District Court Judge James Todd Russell represent the first time since statehood Nevada's Assembly districts are wholly nested inside of a Senate district. Each Assembly district represents 1/42nd of Nevada's population and there are two Assembly districts per Senate district which represents 1/21st of Nevada's population.

District	Assembly Districts	Name	Party	Residence	Start	Next election
1	1, 17	Michelee Crawford	Democratic	Las Vegas	2024	2028
2	11, 28	Edgar Flores	Democratic	Las Vegas	2022	2026
3	3, 10	Rochelle Nguyen	Democratic	Las Vegas	2022 (Note: Originally appointed.)	2028
4	6, 7	Dina Neal	Democratic	Las Vegas	2020	2028
5	22, 29	Carrie Buck	Republican	Henderson	2020	2028
6	34, 37	Nicole Cannizzaro	Democratic	Las Vegas	2016	2028 (term limited)
7	18, 20	Roberta Lange	Democratic	Las Vegas	2020	2028
8	2, 5	Marilyn Dondero Loop	Democratic	Las Vegas	2018	2026
9	9, 42	Melanie Scheible	Democratic	Las Vegas	2018	2026
10	15, 16	Fabian Doñate	Democratic	Las Vegas	2021	2026
11	8, 35	Lori Rogich	Republican	Las Vegas	2024	2028
12	21, 41	Julie Pazina	Democratic	Las Vegas	2022	2026
13	24, 30	Skip Daly	Democratic	Sparks	2022	2026
14	31, 32	Ira Hansen	Republican	Sparks	2018	2026
15	25, 27	Angie Taylor	Democratic	Reno	2024	2028
16	26, 40	Lisa Krasner	Republican	Reno	2022	2026
17	38, 39	Robin Titus	Republican	Wellington	2022	2026
18	4, 13	John Steinbeck	Republican	Las Vegas	2024	2028
19	33, 36	John Ellison	Republican	Elko	2024	2028
20	19, 23	Jeff Stone	Republican	Las Vegas	2022	2026
21	12, 14	James Ohrenschall	Democratic	Las Vegas	2018	2026

== Nebraska ==
Affiliation	Party (Shading indicates majority caucus)			Total	
Affiliation	Republican	Ind	Democratic	Total	Vacant
Start of 109th Legislature	33	1	15	49	0
January 13, 2026	32	1	15	48	1
January 14, 2026	33	1	15	49	0
Latest voting share	67.3%	2%	30.6%		

The Nebraska Legislature officially recognizes no party affiliations; affiliations listed are based on state party endorsements. As of 2026, 33 members are Republicans, 15 are Democrats, and one is a registered Independent.

District	Name	Party	Residence	Start	Next Election
1	Robert Hallstrom	Republican	Syracuse	2025	2028
2	Robert Clements	Republican	Elmwood	2017	2026 (term limited)
3	Victor Rountree	Democratic	Bellevue	2025	2028
4	Brad von Gillern	Republican	Elkhorn	2023	2026
5	Margo Juarez	Democratic	Omaha	2025	2028
6	Machaela Cavanaugh	Democratic	Omaha	2019	2026 (term limited)
7	Dunixi Guereca	Democratic	Omaha	2025	2028
8	Megan Hunt	Independent (Note: Hunt was registered as a Democrat until 2023.)	Omaha	2019	2026 (term limited)
9	John Cavanaugh	Democratic	Omaha	2021	2028 (term limited)
10	Wendy DeBoer	Democratic	Bennington	2019	2026 (term limited)
11	Terrell McKinney	Democratic	Omaha	2021	2028 (term limited)
12	Merv Riepe	Republican	Ralston	2023 (Note: Riepe previously served from 2015–2019.)	2026
13	Ashlei Spivey	Democratic	Omaha	2025	2028
14	John Arch	Republican	LaVista	2019	2026 (term limited)
15	Dave Wordekemper	Republican	Fremont	2025	2028
16	Ben Hansen	Republican	Blair	2019	2026 (term limited)
17	Glen Meyer	Republican	Pender	2025	2028
18	Christy Armendariz	Republican	Omaha	2023	2026
19	Rob Dover	Republican	Norfolk	2022	2028
20	John Fredrickson	Democratic	Omaha	2023	2026
21	Beau Ballard	Republican	Lincoln	2023	2028
22	Mike Moser	Republican	Columbus	2019	2026 (term limited)
23	Jared Storm	Republican	David City	2025	2028
24	Jana Hughes	Republican	Seward	2023	2026
25	Carolyn Bosn	Republican	Lincoln	2023	2028
26	George Dungan III	Democratic	Lincoln	2023	2026
27	Jason Prokop	Democratic	Lincoln	2025	2028
28	Jane Raybould	Democratic	Lincoln	2023	2026
29	Eliot Bostar	Democratic	Lincoln	2021	2028 (term limited)
30	Myron Dorn	Republican	Adams	2019	2026 (term limited)
31	Kathleen Kauth	Republican	Omaha	2022	2028
32	Tom Brandt	Republican	Plymouth	2019	2026 (term limited)
33	Dan Lonowski	Republican	Hastings	2025	2028
34	Loren Lippincott	Republican	Central City	2023	2026
35	Dan Quick	Democratic	Grand Island	2025 (Note: Quick previously served from 2017–2021.)	2028
36	Rick Holdcroft	Republican	Bellevue	2023	2026
37	Stan Clouse	Republican	Kearney	2025	2028
38	Dave Murman	Republican	Glenvil	2019	2026 (term limited)
39	Tony Sorrentino	Republican	Elkhorn	2025	2028
40	Barry DeKay	Republican	Niobrara	2023	2026
41	Fred Meyer	Republican	St. Paul	2026 (Note: Appointed by Governor Jim Pillen; Meyer previously served from 2023–2025.)	2028
42	Mike Jacobson	Republican	North Platte	2022	2026
43	Tanya Storer	Republican	Whitman	2025	2028
44	Teresa Ibach	Republican	Sumner	2023	2026
45	Rita Sanders	Republican	Bellevue	2021	2028 (term limited)
46	Danielle Conrad	Democratic	Lincoln	2023 (Note: Conrad previously served from 2007–2015.)	2026
47	Paul Strommen	Republican	Sidney	2025	2028
48	Brian Hardin	Republican	Gering	2023	2026
49	Bob Andersen	Republican	Omaha	2025	2028

== New Hampshire ==
Map of former (March 2021) partisan composition of legislative districts for state senate: Republican senator Democratic senator

District	Name	Party	Residence	Start
1	David Rochefort	Rep	Littleton	2022
2	Timothy Lang Sr.	Rep	Sanbornton	2022
3	Mark McConkey	Rep	Freedom	2024
4	David Watters	Dem	Dover	2012
5	Suzanne Prentiss	Dem	Lebanon	2020
6	James Gray	Rep	Rochester	2016
7	Daniel Innis (Note: Innis previously served in the state senate from 2016–2018.)	Rep	Bradford	2022
8	Ruth Ward	Rep	Stoddard	2016
9	Denise Ricciardi	Rep	Bedford	2020
10	Donovan Fenton	Dem	Keene	2022
11	Tim McGough	Rep	Merrimack	2024
12	Kevin Avard (Note: Avard previously served in the state senate from 2014–2018.)	Rep	Nashua	2020
13	Cindy Rosenwald	Dem	Nashua	2018
14	Sharon Carson	Rep	Londonderry	2008
15	Tara Reardon	Dem	Concord	2024
16	Keith Murphy	Rep	Manchester	2022
17	Howard Pearl	Rep	Loudon	2022
18	Victoria Sullivan	Rep	Manchester	2024
19	Regina Birdsell	Rep	Hampstead	2014
20	Patrick Long	Dem	Manchester	2024
21	Rebecca Kwoka	Dem	Portsmouth	2020
22	Daryl Abbas	Rep	Salem	2022
23	Bill Gannon (Note: Gannon previously served in the state senate from 2016–2018.)	Rep	Sandown	2020
24	Debra Altschiller	Dem	Stratham	2022

== New Jersey ==
District	Name	Party	Start	Counties	Residence
1	Mike Testa	Republican	December 5, 2019	Atlantic, Cape May, Cumberland	Vineland
2	Vincent J. Polistina	Republican	November 8, 2021	Atlantic	Egg Harbor Township
3	John Burzichelli	Democratic	January 9, 2024	Cumberland, Gloucester Salem	Paulsboro
4	Paul D. Moriarty	Democratic	January 9, 2024	Atlantic, Camden, Gloucester	Washington Township
5	Nilsa Cruz-Perez	Democratic	December 15, 2014	Camden, Gloucester	Barrington
6	James Beach	Democratic	January 3, 2009	Burlington, Camden	Voorhees Township
7	Troy Singleton	Democratic	January 9, 2018	Burlington	Palmyra
8	Latham Tiver	Republican	January 9, 2024	Atlantic, Burlington	Southampton
9	Carmen Amato	Republican	January 9, 2024	Ocean	Lacey
10	James W. Holzapfel	Republican	January 10, 2012	Ocean, Monmouth	Toms River
11	Vin Gopal	Democratic	January 9, 2018	Monmouth	Long Branch
12	Owen Henry	Republican	January 9, 2024	Burlington, Middlesex, Ocean	Old Bridge Township
13	Declan O'Scanlon	Republican	January 9, 2018	Monmouth	Little Silver
14	Linda R. Greenstein	Democratic	December 6, 2010	Mercer, Middlesex	Plainsboro Township
15	Shirley Turner	Democratic	January 13, 1998	Hunterdon, Mercer	Lawrence Township
16	Andrew Zwicker	Democratic	January 11, 2022	Hunterdon, Mercer, Middlesex, Somerset	South Brunswick
17	Bob Smith	Democratic	January 8, 2002	Middlesex, Somerset	Piscataway
18	Patrick J. Diegnan	Democratic	May 9, 2016	Middlesex	South Plainfield
19	Joe F. Vitale	Democratic	January 13, 1998	Middlesex	Woodbridge
20	Joseph Cryan	Democratic	January 9, 2018	Union	Union Township
21	Jon Bramnick	Republican	January 11, 2022	Middlesex, Morris, Somerset, Union	Westfield
22	Nicholas Scutari	Democratic	January 13, 2004	Somerset, Union	Linden
23	Doug Steinhardt	Republican	December 19, 2022	Hunterdon, Somerset, Warren	Lopatcong
24	Parker Space	Republican	January 9, 2024	Morris, Sussex, Warren	Wantage
25	Anthony M. Bucco	Republican	October 24, 2019	Morris, Passaic	Boonton Township
26	Joseph Pennacchio	Republican	January 8, 2008	Morris, Passaic	Rockaway Township
27	John F. McKeon	Democratic	January 9, 2024	Essex, Passaic	West Orange
28	Renee Burgess	Democratic	September 29, 2022	Essex, Union	Irvington
29	Teresa Ruiz	Democratic	January 8, 2008	Essex, Hudson	Newark
30	Robert W. Singer	Republican	October 14, 1993	Monmouth, Ocean	Lakewood Township
31	Angela V. McKnight	Democratic	January 9, 2024	Hudson	Jersey City
32	Raj Mukherji	Democratic	January 9, 2024	Hudson	Jersey City
33	Brian P. Stack	Democratic	January 8, 2008	Hudson	Union City
34	Britnee Timberlake	Democratic	January 9, 2024	Essex	East Orange
35	Benjie Wimberly	Democratic	January 30, 2025	Bergen, Passaic	Paterson
36	Paul Sarlo	Democratic	May 19, 2003	Bergen, Passaic	Wood-Ridge
37	Gordon M. Johnson	Democratic	January 11, 2022	Bergen	Englewood
38	Joseph Lagana	Democratic	April 12, 2018	Bergen	Paramus
39	Holly Schepisi	Republican	March 25, 2021	Bergen	River Vale
40	Kristin Corrado	Republican	October 5, 2017	Bergen, Passaic	Totowa

== New Mexico ==
District	Name	Party	Residence	Start	Counties
1	William Sharer	Rep	Farmington	2000	San Juan (part)
2	Steve D. Lanier	Rep	Aztec	2024	San Juan (part)
3	Shannon Pinto	Dem	Tohatchi	2019 (Note: Originally appointed.)	McKinley (part), San Juan (part)
4	George Muñoz	Dem	Gallup	2008	Cibola (part), McKinley (part), San Juan (part)
5	Leo Jaramillo	Dem	Española	2020	Los Alamos (part), Rio Arriba (part), Sandoval (part), Santa Fe (part)
6	Roberto Gonzales	Dem	Ranchos de Taos	2019	Los Alamos (part), Rio Arriba (part), Santa Fe (part), Taos (part)
7	Pat Woods	Rep	Broadview	2012	Curry (part), Harding (part), Quay (part), Union
8	Pete Campos	Dem	Las Vegas	1990	Colfax, Guadalupe, Harding (part), Mora, Quay (part), San Miguel (part), Taos (part)
9	Cindy Nava	Dem	Bernalillo	2024	Bernalillo (part), Sandoval (part)
10	Katy Duhigg	Dem	Albuquerque	2020	Bernalillo (part)
11	Linda M. Lopez	Dem	Albuquerque	1996	Bernalillo (part)
12	Jay C. Block	Rep	Rio Rancho	2024	Bernalillo (part), Sandoval (part)
13	Debbie O'Malley	Dem	Albuquerque	2024	Bernalillo (part)
14	Michael Padilla	Dem	Albuquerque	2012	Bernalillo (part)
15	Heather Berghmans	Dem	Albuquerque	2024	Bernalillo (part)
16	Antoinette Sedillo Lopez	Dem	Albuquerque	2019	Bernalillo (part)
17	Mimi Stewart	Dem	Albuquerque	2015	Bernalillo (part)
18	Natalie Figueroa	Dem	Albuquerque	2024	Bernalillo (part)
19	Ant Thornton	Rep	Sandia Park	2024	Bernalillo (part), Sandoval (part), Santa Fe (part), Torrance (part)
20	Martin Hickey	Dem	Albuquerque	2020	Bernalillo (part)
21	Nicole Tobiassen	Rep	Albuquerque	2024	Bernalillo (part)
22	Benny Shendo	Dem	Jemez Pueblo	2012	Bernalillo (part), McKinley (part), Rio Arriba (part), San Juan (part), Sandoval (part)
23	Harold Pope Jr.	Dem	Albuquerque	2020	Bernalillo (part)
24	Linda Trujillo	Dem	Santa Fe	2024	Santa Fe (part), Socorro (part)
25	Peter Wirth	Dem	Santa Fe	2008	Santa Fe (part)
26	Moe Maestas	Dem	Albuquerque	2022	Bernalillo (part)
27	Pat Boone	Rep	Elida	2024	Chaves (part), Curry (part), De Baca, Lea (part), Roosevelt
28	Gabriel Ramos	Rep (Note: Ramos previously served in the state senate as a Democrat from 2019–2020.)	Silver City	2024	Grant (part), Hidalgo (part), Luna (part)
29	Joshua A. Sanchez	Rep	Bosque	2020	Socorro (part), Valencia (part)
30	Angel Charley	Dem	Acoma	2024	Bernalillo (part)
31	Joe Cervantes	Dem	Las Cruces	2012	Chaves (part), Doña Ana (part), Otero (part)
32	Candy Ezzell	Rep	Roswell	2024	Chaves (part), Eddy (part)
33	Rex Wilson	Rep	Ancho	2026	Lincoln, Otero (part)
34	James G. Townsend	Rep	Artesia	2024	Eddy (part), Otero (part)
35	Crystal Brantley	Rep	Elephant Butte	2020	Catron, Doña Ana (part), Grant (part), Hidalgo (part), Luna (part), Sierra, Socorro (part)
36	Jeff Steinborn	Dem	Las Cruces	2016	Doña Ana (part)
37	William Soules	Dem	Las Cruces	2012	Doña Ana (part)
38	Carrie Hamblen	Dem	Las Cruces	2020	Doña Ana (part)
39	Liz Stefanics	Dem	Los Cerrillos	2016	San Miguel (part), Santa Fe (part), Torrance (part), Valencia (part)
40	Craig Brandt	Rep	Rio Rancho	2012	Sandoval (part)
41	David Gallegos	Rep	Eunice	2020	Eddy (part), Lea (part)
42	Larry R. Scott	Rep	Hobbs	2024	Chaves (part), Eddy (part), Lea (part)

== New York ==
District	Name	Party	Start	Counties	Residence
1	Anthony Palumbo	Republican	2020	Suffolk	New Suffolk
2	Mario Mattera	Republican	2020	Suffolk	St. James
3	Dean Murray	Republican	2022	Suffolk	East Patchogue
4	Monica Martinez	Democratic	2022	Suffolk	Brentwood
5	Steven Rhoads	Republican	2022	Nassau	Bellmore
6	Siela Bynoe	Democratic	2024	Nassau	Westbury
7	Jack Martins	Republican	2022	Nassau	Great Neck
8	Alexis Weik	Republican	2020	Nassau, Suffolk	Sayville
9	Patricia Canzoneri-Fitzpatrick	Republican	2022	Nassau	Malverne
10	James Sanders Jr.	Democratic	2012	Queens	Queens (Far Rockaway)
11	Toby Ann Stavisky	Democratic	1999 (Note: First elected in a special election.)	Queens	Queens (Whitestone)
12	Michael Gianaris	Democratic	2010	Queens	Queens (Astoria)
13	Jessica Ramos	Democratic	2018	Queens	Queens (East Elmhurst)
14	Leroy Comrie	Democratic	2014	Queens	Queens (St. Albans)
15	Joseph Addabbo Jr.	Democratic	2008	Queens	Queens (Ozone Park)
16	John Liu	Democratic	2018	Queens	Queens (Flushing)
17	Stephen T. Chan	Republican	2024	Kings	Brooklyn (Bensonhurst)
18	Julia Salazar	Democratic	2018	Kings	Brooklyn (Bushwick)
19	Roxanne Persaud	Democratic	2015	Kings	Brooklyn (Canarsie)
20	Zellnor Myrie	Democratic	2018	Kings	Brooklyn (Prospect Lefferts Gardens)
21	Kevin Parker	Democratic	2002	Kings	Brooklyn (Flatbush)
22	Sam Sutton	Democratic	2025	Kings	Brooklyn (Midwood)
23	Jessica Scarcella-Spanton	Democratic	2022	Kings, Richmond	Staten Island (North Shore)
24	Andrew Lanza	Republican	2006	Richmond	Staten Island (Great Kills)
25	Jabari Brisport	Democratic	2020	Kings	Brooklyn (Clinton Hill)
26	Andrew Gounardes	Democratic	2018	Kings	Brooklyn (Bay Ridge)
27	Brian P. Kavanagh	Democratic	2017	New York	Manhattan (East Side)
28	Liz Krueger	Democratic	2002	New York	Manhattan (Upper East Side)
29	José M. Serrano	Democratic	2004	New York, Bronx	The Bronx (South Bronx)
30	Cordell Cleare	Democratic	2021	New York	Manhattan (Harlem)
31	Robert Jackson	Democratic	2018	New York, Bronx	Manhattan (Fort George)
32	Luis R. Sepúlveda	Democratic	2018	Bronx	The Bronx (West Farms)
33	Gustavo Rivera	Democratic	2010	Bronx	The Bronx (University Heights)
34	Nathalia Fernandez	Democratic	2022	Bronx, Westchester	The Bronx (Morris Park)
35	Andrea Stewart-Cousins	Democratic	2006	Westchester	Yonkers
36	Jamaal Bailey	Democratic	2016	Bronx, Westchester	The Bronx (Baychester)
37	Shelley Mayer	Democratic	2018	Westchester	Yonkers
38	Bill Weber	Republican	2022	Rockland	Montebello
39	Robert Rolison	Republican	2022	Dutchess, Orange, Putnam	Poughkeepsie
40	Peter Harckham	Democratic	2018	Putnam, Rockland, Westchester	South Salem
41	Michelle Hinchey	Democratic	2020	Columbia, Dutchess, Greene, Ulster	Saugerties
42	James Skoufis	Democratic	2018	Orange	Cornwall
43	Jake Ashby	Republican	2022	Albany, Rensselaer, Washington	Castleton-on-Hudson
44	Jim Tedisco	Republican	2016	Saratoga, Schenectady	Glenville
45	Dan Stec	Republican	2020	Clinton, Essex, Franklin, Saint Lawrence, Warren, Washington	Queensbury
46	Patricia Fahy	Democratic	2024	Albany, Montgomery, Schenectady	Albany
47	Erik Bottcher	Democratic	2026	New York	Manhattan (Chelsea)
48	Rachel May	Democratic	2018	Cayuga, Onondaga	Syracuse
49	Mark Walczyk	Republican	2022	Fulton, Hamilton, Herkimer, Jefferson, Lewis, Oswego, St. Lawrence	Watertown
50	Chris Ryan	Democratic	2024	Onondaga, Oswego	Syracuse
51	Peter Oberacker	Republican	2020	Broome, Chenango, Delaware, Herkimer, Otsego, Schoharie, Sullivan, Ulster	Schenevus
52	Lea Webb	Democratic	2022	Broome, Cortland, Tompkins	Binghamton
53	Joseph Griffo	Republican	2006	Chenango, Madison, Oneida	Rome
54	Pam Helming	Republican	2016	Livingston, Monroe, Ontario, Wayne	Canandaigua
55	Samra Brouk	Democratic	2020	Monroe	Rochester
56	Jeremy Cooney	Democratic	2020	Monroe	Rochester
57	George Borrello	Republican	2019	Allegany, Cattaraugus, Chautauqua, Genesee, Wyoming	Sunset Bay
58	Tom O'Mara	Republican	2010	Allegany, Chemung, Schuyler, Seneca, Steuben, Tioga, Yates	Big Flats
59	Kristen Gonzalez	Democratic	2022	Kings, New York, Queens	Queens (Long Island City)
60	Patrick M. Gallivan	Republican	2010	Erie	Elma
61	Jeremy Zellner	Democratic	2026	Erie	Tonawanda
62	Rob Ortt	Republican	2014	Monroe, Niagara, Orleans	North Tonawanda
63	April Baskin	Democratic	2024	Erie	Buffalo

== North Carolina ==
District	Name	Party	Residence	Counties	Start
1st	Bobby Hanig	Republican	Powells Point	Bertie, Northampton, Hertford, Gates, Perquimans, Pasquotank, Camden, Currituck, Tyrrell, Dare	2022 (Note: Originally appointed to fill the remainder of an unexpired term.)
2nd	Norman Sanderson	Republican	Minnesott Beach	Warren, Halifax, Martin, Chowan, Washington, Hyde, Pamlico, Carteret	2012
3rd	Bob Brinson	Republican	New Bern	Lenoir, Craven, Beaufort	2024
4th	Buck Newton	Republican	Wilson	Wilson, Wayne, Greene	2022 (2010–2016)
5th	Kandie Smith	Democratic	Greenville	Edgecombe, Pitt	2022
6th	Michael Lazzara	Republican	Jacksonville	Onslow	2020
7th	Michael Lee	Republican	Wilmington	New Hanover (part)	2020 (2014–2018)
8th	Bill Rabon	Republican	Southport	Columbus, Brunswick, New Hanover (part)	2010
9th	Brent Jackson	Republican	Autryville	Bladen, Sampson (part), Pender, Duplin, Jones	2010
10th	Benton Sawrey	Republican	Clayton	Johnston	2022
11th	Lisa Stone Barnes	Republican	Spring Hope	Vance, Franklin, Nash	2020
12th	Jim Burgin	Republican	Angier	Lee, Harnett, Sampson (part)	2018
13th	Lisa Grafstein	Democratic	Raleigh	Wake (part)	2022
14th	Dan Blue	Democratic	Raleigh	Wake (part)	2009
15th	Jay Chaudhuri	Democratic	Raleigh	Wake (part)	2016
16th	Gale Adcock	Democratic	Cary	Wake (part)	2022
17th	Sydney Batch	Democratic	Holly Springs	Wake (part)	2021
18th	Haseeb Fatmi	Democratic	Wake Forest	Granville, Wake (part)	2026
19th	Val Applewhite	Democratic	Fayetteville	Cumberland (part)	2022
20th	Natalie Murdock	Democratic	Durham	Chatham, Durham (part)	2020
21st	Tom McInnis	Republican	Pinehurst	Moore, Cumberland (part)	2014
22nd	Sophia Chitlik	Democratic	Durham	Durham (part)	2024
23rd	Jonah Garson	Democratic	Chapel Hill	Caswell, Person, Orange	2026
24th	Danny Britt	Republican	Lumberton	Hoke, Scotland, Robeson	2016
25th	Amy Galey	Republican	Burlington	Alamance, Randolph (part)	2020
26th	Phil Berger	Republican	Eden	Rockingham, Guilford (part)	2000
27th	Michael Garrett	Democratic	Greensboro	Guilford (part)	2018
28th	Gladys Robinson	Democratic	Greensboro	Guilford (part)	2010
29th	Dave Craven	Republican	Asheboro	Randolph (part), Montgomery, Richmond, Anson, Union (part)	2020
30th	Steve Jarvis	Republican	Lexington	Davie, Davidson	2020
31st	Dana Caudill Jones	Republican	Kernersville	Stokes, Forsyth (part)	2024
32nd	Paul Lowe	Democratic	Winston-Salem	Forsyth (part)	2015
33rd	Carl Ford	Republican	China Grove	Rowan, Stanly	2018
34th	Chris Measmer	Republican	Concord	Cabarrus (part)	2025
35th	Todd Johnson	Republican	Monroe	Cabarrus (part), Union (part)	2018
36th	Eddie Settle	Republican	Elkin	Alexander, Wilkes, Surry, Yadkin	2022
37th	Vickie Sawyer	Republican	Mooresville	Iredell, Mecklenburg (part)	2018
38th	Mujtaba Mohammed	Democratic	Charlotte	Mecklenburg (part)	2018
39th	DeAndrea Salvador	Democratic	Charlotte	Mecklenburg (part)	2020
40th	Joyce Waddell	Democratic	Charlotte	Mecklenburg (part)	2014
41st	Caleb Theodros	Democratic	Charlotte	Mecklenburg (part)	2024
42nd	Woodson Bradley	Democratic	Charlotte	Mecklenburg (part)	2024
43rd	Brad Overcash	Republican	Belmont	Gaston (part)	2022
44th	Ted Alexander	Republican	Shelby	Cleveland, Lincoln, Gaston (part)	2018
45th	Mark Hollo	Republican	Conover	Catawba, Caldwell (part)	2024
46th	Warren Daniel	Republican	Morganton	Burke, McDowell, Buncombe (part)	2010
47th	Ralph Hise	Republican	Spruce Pine	Alleghany, Ashe, Watauga, Caldwell (part), Avery, Mitchell, Yancey, Madison, Haywood (part)	2010
48th	Tim Moffitt	Republican	Hendersonville	Henderson, Polk, Rutherford	2022
49th	Julie Mayfield	Democratic	Asheville	Buncombe (part)	2020
50th	Kevin Corbin	Republican	Franklin	Haywood (part), Transylvania, Jackson, Swain, Macon, Graham, Cherokee, Clay	2020

== North Dakota ==
District	Name	Party	Residence	Start	Next Election
1	Brad Bekkedahl	Rep	Williston	2014	2026
2	Mark Enget	Rep	Powers Lake	2024	2028
3	Bob Paulson	Rep	Minot	2022	2026
4	Chuck Walen	Rep	New Town	2024	2028
5	Randy Burckhard	Rep	Minot	2010	2026
6	Paul Thomas	Rep	Velva	2024	2028
7	Michelle Axtman	Rep	Bismarck	2022	2026
8	Jeffery Magrum	Rep	Hazelton	2022	2028
9	Richard Marcellais	Dem-NPL	Belcourt	2024 (special)	2026
10	Ryan Braunberger	Dem-NPL	Fargo	2022	2028
11	Tim Mathern	Dem-NPL	Fargo	1986	2026
12	Cole Conley	Rep	Jamestown	2020	2028
13	Judy Lee	Rep	West Fargo	1994	2026
14	Jerry Klein	Rep	Fessenden	1996	2028
15	Kent Weston	Rep	Sarles	2022 (Note: Represented District 9 prior to 2024)	2026
16	David Clemens	Rep	West Fargo	2016	2028
17	Jonathan Sickler	Rep	Grand Forks	2022 (Note: Originally appointed.)	2026
18	Scott Meyer	Rep	Grand Forks	2016	2028
19	Janne Myrdal	Rep	Edinburg	2016 (Note: Represented District 10 prior to 2022)	2026
20	Randy Lemm	Rep	Hillsboro	2018	2028
21	Kathy Hogan	Dem-NPL	Fargo	2018	2026
22	Mark Weber	Rep	Casselton	2020	2028
23	Todd Beard	Rep	Williston	2022	2026
24	Michael Wobbema	Rep	Valley City	2020	2028
25	Larry Luick	Rep	Fairmount	2010	2026
26	Dale Patten	Rep	Watford City	2018 (Note: Represented District 39 prior to 2022)	2028
27	Kristin Roers	Rep	Fargo	2018	2026
28	Robert Erbele	Rep	Lehr	2000	2028
29	Terry Wanzek	Rep	Jamestown	1994	2026
30	Diane Larson	Rep	Bismarck	2016	2028
31	Donald Schaible	Rep	Mott	2010	2026
32	Dick Dever	Rep	Bismarck	2008	2028
33	Keith Boehm	Rep	Mandan	2022	2026
34	Justin Gerhardt	Rep	Mandan	2023	2028
35	Sean Cleary	Rep	Bismarck	2022	2026
36	Desiree Van Oosting	Rep	Judson	2024	2028
37	Dean Rummel	Rep	Dickinson	2022	2026
38	David Hogue	Rep	Minot	2008	2028
39	Greg Kessel	Rep	Belfield	2022	2026
40	Jose L. Castaneda	Rep	Minot	2024	2028
41	Kyle Davison	Rep	Fargo	2014	2026
42	Claire Cory	Rep	Grand Forks	2024	2028
43	Jeff Barta	Rep	Grand Forks	2022	2026
44	Joshua Boschee	Dem-NPL	Fargo	2024	2028
45	Ronald Sorvaag	Rep	Fargo	2010	2026
46	Michelle Powers	Rep	Fargo	2024	2028
47	Michael Dwyer	Rep	Bismarck	2018	2026

== Ohio ==
Senate districts by party: Democratic Republican

District	Name	Party	Residence	Counties	Term Limited	Start
1	Rob McColley	Republican	Napoleon	Defiance, Fulton, Hancock, Hardin, Henry, Logan, Paulding, Putnam, Van Wert, Williams	2026	2017 (Note: Originally appointed.)
2	Theresa Gavarone	Republican	Bowling Green	Erie, Huron, Lucas, Ottawa, Wood	2028	2019
3	Michele Reynolds	Republican	Canal Winchester	Franklin, Madison, Pickaway	2030	2022
4	George Lang	Republican	West Chester	Butler	2028	2020
5	Steve Huffman	Republican	Tipp City	Butler, Darke, Miami, Montgomery, Preble	2026	2018
6	Willis Blackshear Jr.	Democratic	Dayton	Montgomery	2032	2024
7	Steve Wilson	Republican	Maineville	Hamilton, Warren	2026	2017
8	Louis Blessing	Republican	Colerain Township	Hamilton	2028	2019
9	Catherine Ingram	Democratic	Cincinnati	Hamilton	2030	2022
10	Kyle Koehler	Republican	Springfield	Clark, Clinton, Greene	2032	2024
11	Paula Hicks-Hudson	Democratic	Toledo	Lucas	2030	2022
12	Susan Manchester	Republican	Waynesfield	Allen, Auglaize, Champaign, Darke, Logan, Mercer, Shelby	2032	2024
13	Nathan Manning	Republican	North Ridgeville	Huron, Lorain	2026	2018
14	Terry Johnson	Republican	McDermott	Adams, Brown, Clermont, Scioto	2028	2019
15	Hearcel Craig	Democratic	Columbus	Franklin	2026	2018
16	Beth Liston	Democratic	Dublin	Franklin	2032	2024
17	Shane Wilkin	Republican	Jasper Township	Fayette, Gallia, Highland, Hocking, Jackson, Lawrence, Perry, Pike, Ross, Vinton	2030	2022
18	Jerry Cirino	Republican	Kirtland	Cuyahoga, Lake	2028	2020
19	Andrew Brenner	Republican	Powell	Coshocton, Delaware, Holmes, Knox	2026	2018
20	Tim Schaffer	Republican	Lancaster	Fairfield, Licking, Perry	2028	2019
21	Kent Smith	Democratic	Cleveland	Cuyahoga	2030	2022
22	Mark Romanchuk	Republican	Ontario	Ashland, Medina, Richland	2028	2020
23	Nickie Antonio	Democratic	Lakewood	Cuyahoga	2026	2018
24	Tom Patton	Republican	Strongsville	Cuyahoga	2032	2024
25	Bill DeMora	Democratic	Columbus	Franklin	2030	2022
26	Bill Reineke	Republican	Eden Township	Crawford, Marion, Morrow, Sandusky, Seneca, Union, Wyandot	2028	2020
27	Kristina Roegner	Republican	Hudson	Geauga, Portage, Summit	2026	2018
28	Casey Weinstein	Democratic	Hudson	Summit	2032	2024
29	Jane Timken	Republican	Canton	Stark	2034	2025
30	Brian Chavez	Republican	Marietta	Athens, Belmont, Guernsey, Harrison, Jefferson, Meigs, Monroe, Morgan, Noble, Washington	2032	2023
31	Al Landis	Republican	Dover	Guernsey, Muskingum, Stark, Tuscarawas, Wayne	2030	2022
32	Sandra O'Brien	Republican	Lenox Township	Ashtabula, Geauga, Trumbull	2028	2020
33	Alessandro Cutrona	Republican	Canfield	Carroll, Columbiana, Mahoning	2034	2024

== Oklahoma ==
District	Name	Party	Residence	Start	Next Election
1	Micheal Bergstrom	Rep	Adair	2016	2028 (term limited)
2	Ally Seifried	Rep	Claremore	2022	2026
3	Julie McIntosh	Rep	Tahlequah	2024	2028
4	Tom Woods	Rep	Westville	2022	2026
5	George Burns	Rep	Pollard	2020	2028
6	David Bullard	Rep	Durant	2018	2026
7	Warren Hamilton	Rep	McCurtain	2020	2028
8	Bryan Logan	Rep	Paden	2025 (special)	2026
9	Avery Frix	Rep	Muskogee	2024	2028 (term limited)
10	Bill Coleman	Rep	Ponca City	2018	2026
11	Regina Goodwin	Dem	Tulsa	2024	2028 (term limited)
12	Todd Gollihare	Rep	Kellyville	2022	2026
13	Jonathan Wingard	Rep	Ada	2024	2028
14	Jerry Alvord	Rep	Wilson	2022	2026
15	Lisa Standridge	Rep	Norman	2024	2028
16	Mary B. Boren	Dem	Norman	2018	2026
17	Shane Jett	Rep	Tecumseh	2020	2026 (special, term limited)
18	Jack Stewart	Rep	Yukon	2022	2026
19	Roland Pederson	Rep	Burlington	2016	2028 (term limited)
20	Chuck Hall	Rep	Perry	2018	2026
21	Randy Grellner	Rep	Stillwater	2024	2028
22	Kristen Thompson	Rep	Edmond	2022	2026
23	Lonnie Paxton	Rep	Tuttle	2016	2028 (term limited)
24	Darrell Weaver	Rep	Moore	2018	2026
25	Brian Guthrie	Rep	Broken Arrow	2024	2028
26	Darcy Jech	Rep	Kingfisher	2014	2026 (term limited)
27	Casey Murdock	Rep	Felt	2018 (special)	2028 (term limited)
28	Grant Green	Rep	Wellston	2022	2026
29	Julie Daniels	Rep	Bartlesville	2016	2028 (term limited)
30	Julia Kirt	Dem	Oklahoma City	2018	2026
31	Spencer Kern	Rep	Waurika	2024	2028
32	Dusty Deevers	Rep	Elgin	2023 (special)	2026
33	Christi Gillespie	Rep	Tulsa	2024	2028
34	Dana Prieto	Rep	Tulsa	2022	2026
35	Jo Anna Dossett	Dem	Tulsa	2020	2028
36	John Haste	Rep	Broken Arrow	2018	2026
37	Aaron Reinhardt	Rep	Tulsa	2024	2028
38	Brent Howard	Rep	Altus	2018	2026
39	David Rader	Rep	Tulsa	2016	2028 (term limited)
40	Carri Hicks	Dem	Oklahoma City	2018	2026
41	Adam Pugh	Rep	Edmond	2016	2028 (term limited)
42	Brenda Stanley	Rep	Midwest City	2018	2026
43	Kendal Sacchieri	Rep	Duncan	2024	2028
44	Michael Brooks-Jimenez	Dem	Oklahoma City	2017 (special)	2026
45	Paul Rosino	Rep	Oklahoma City	2017 (special)	2028
46	Mark Mann	Dem	Oklahoma City	2024 (special)	2026
47	Kelly E. Hines	Rep	Oklahoma City	2024	2028
48	Nikki Nice	Dem	Oklahoma City	2024 (special)	2026

== Oregon ==
District	Name	Party	Residence	Start
1	David Smith	Republican	Port Orford	2023
2	Noah Robinson	Republican	Cave Junction	2025
3	Jeff Golden	Democratic	Ashland	2019
4	Floyd Prozanski	Democratic	Eugene	2004
5	Dick Anderson	Republican	Lincoln City	2021
6	Cedric Hayden	Republican	Fall Creek	2023
7	James Manning	Democratic	Eugene	2021
8	Sara Gelser Blouin	Democratic	Corvallis	2015
9	Fred Girod	Republican	Stayton	2008
10	Deb Patterson	Democratic	Salem	2021
11	Kim Thatcher	Republican	Keizer	2023
12	Bruce Starr	Republican	Dundee	2025
13	Courtney Neron Misslin	Democratic	Wilsonville	2025
14	Kate Lieber	Democratic	Beaverton	2021
15	Janeen Sollman	Democratic	Hillsboro	2022
16	Suzanne Weber	Republican	Tillamook	2023
17	Lisa Reynolds	Democratic	North Bethany	2024
18	Wlnsvey Campos	Democratic	Aloha	2023
19	Rob Wagner	Democratic	Lake Oswego	2023
20	Mark Meek	Democratic	Gladstone	2023
21	Kathleen Taylor	Democratic	Portland	2017
22	Lew Frederick	Democratic	Portland	2017
23	Khanh Pham	Democratic	Portland	2025
24	Kayse Jama	Democratic	Portland	2024
25	Chris Gorsek	Democratic	Troutdale	2021
26	Christine Drazan	Republican	Canby	2025
27	Anthony Broadman	Democratic	Bend	2025
28	Diane Linthicum	Republican	Beatty	2025
29	Todd Nash	Republican	Enterprise	2025
30	Mike McLane	Republican	Powell Butte	2025

== Pennsylvania ==
District	Name	Party	Residence	Counties	Start	Next Election
1	Nikil Saval	Democratic	Philadelphia	Philadelphia	2020	2028
2	Christine Tartaglione	Democratic	Philadelphia	Philadelphia	1994	2026
3	Sharif Street	Democratic	Philadelphia	Philadelphia	2016	2028
4	Art Haywood	Democratic	Philadelphia	Montgomery, Philadelphia	2014	2026
5	Joe Picozzi	Republican	Philadelphia	Philadelphia	2024	2028
6	Frank Farry	Republican	Langhorne Borough	Bucks	2022	2026
7	Vincent Hughes	Democratic	Philadelphia	Montgomery, Philadelphia	1994	2028
8	Anthony Williams	Democratic	Philadelphia	Delaware, Philadelphia	1998	2026
9	John Kane	Democratic	Birmingham	Chester, Delaware	2020	2028
10	Steve Santarsiero	Democratic	Lower Makefield Township	Bucks	2018	2026
11	Judy Schwank	Democratic	Fleetwood	Berks	2011	2028
12	Maria Collett	Democratic	Lower Gwynedd Township	Montgomery	2018	2026
13	Scott Martin	Republican	West Lampeter Township	Berks, Lancaster	2016	2028
14	Nick Miller	Democratic	Allentown	Lehigh, Northampton	2022	2026
15	Patty Kim	Democratic	Harrisburg	Dauphin	2024	2028
16	Jarrett Coleman	Republican	Upper Macungie Township	Bucks, Lehigh	2022	2026
17	Amanda Cappelletti	Democratic	East Norriton Township	Delaware, Montgomery	2020	2028
18	Lisa Boscola	Democratic	Bethlehem Township	Lehigh, Northampton	1998	2026
19	Carolyn Comitta	Democratic	West Chester	Chester	2020	2028
20	Lisa Baker	Republican	Lehman Township	Luzerne, Pike, Susquehanna, Wayne, Wyoming	2006	2026
21	Scott Hutchinson	Republican	Oil City	Butler, Clarion, Forest, Venango, Warren	2012	2028
22	Marty Flynn	Democratic	Scranton	Lackawanna, Luzerne	2021 (Note: Elected in a special election.)	2026
23	Eugene Yaw	Republican	Loyalsock Township	Bradford, Lycoming, Sullivan, Tioga, Union	2008	2028
24	Tracy Pennycuick	Republican	Harleysville	Berks, Montgomery	2022	2026
25	Cris Dush	Republican	Pine Creek Township	Cameron, Centre, Clinton, Elk, Jefferson, McKean, Potter	2020	2028
26	Tim Kearney	Democratic	Swarthmore	Delaware	2018	2026
27	Lynda Culver	Republican	Sunbury	Columbia, Luzerne, Montour, Northumberland, Snyder	2023	2028
28	Kristin Phillips-Hill	Republican	York Township	York	2018	2026
29	Dave Argall	Republican	Rush Township	Carbon, Luzerne, Schuylkill	2009	2028
30	Judy Ward	Republican	Hollidaysburg	Blair, Fulton, Huntingdon, Juniata, Mifflin	2018	2026
31	Dawn Keefer	Republican	Dillsburg	Cumberland, York	2024	2028
32	Patrick Stefano	Republican	Bullskin Township	Bedford, Fayette, Somerset, Westmoreland	2014	2026
33	Doug Mastriano	Republican	Greene Township	Adams, Franklin	2019	2028
34	Greg Rothman	Republican	Silver Spring Township	Cumberland, Dauphin, Perry	2022	2026
35	Wayne Langerholc	Republican	Johnstown	Cambria County, Centre, Clearfield	2016	2028
36	James Malone	Democratic	East Petersburg	Lancaster	2025	2026
37	Devlin Robinson	Republican	Bridgeville	Allegheny	2020	2028
38	Lindsey Williams	Democratic	West View	Allegheny	2018	2026
39	Kim Ward	Republican	Hempfield Township	Westmoreland	2008	2028
40	Rosemary Brown	Republican	East Stroudsburg	Lackawanna, Monroe, Wayne	2022	2026
41	Joe Pittman	Republican	Indiana	Armstrong, Indiana, Jefferson, Westmoreland	2019	2028
42	Wayne Fontana	Democratic	Pittsburgh	Allegheny	2005	2026
43	Jay Costa	Democratic	Forest Hills	Allegheny	1996	2028
44	Katie Muth	Democratic	East Vincent Township	Berks, Chester, Montgomery	2018	2026
45	Nick Pisciottano	Democratic	West Mifflin	Allegheny	2024	2028
46	Camera Bartolotta	Republican	Monongahela	Beaver, Greene, Washington	2014	2026
47	Elder Vogel	Republican	New Sewickley Township	Beaver, Butler, Lawrence	2008	2028
48	Chris Gebhard	Republican	North Cornwall Township	Berks, Lancaster, Lebanon	2021	2026
49	Dan Laughlin	Republican	Millcreek Township	Erie	2016	2028
50	Michele Brooks	Republican	Jamestown	Crawford, Lawrence, Mercer	2014	2026

== Rhode Island ==
District	Name	Party	Municipalities	Counties	Start
1	Jake Bissaillon	Dem	Providence	Providence	2023 (Note: First elected in a special election.)
2	Ana Quezada	Dem	Providence	Providence	2016
3	Sam Zurier	Dem	Providence	Providence	2021
4	Stefano Famiglietti	Dem	Providence, North Providence	Providence	2025
5	Sam Bell	Dem	Providence	Providence	2018
6	Tiara Mack	Dem	Providence	Providence	2020
7	Frank Ciccone	Dem	Johnston, Providence	Providence	2002
8	Lori Urso	Dem	Pawtucket	Providence	2024
9	John Burke	Dem	West Warwick	Kent	2020
10	Walter Felag	Dem	Bristol, Tiverton, Warren	Bristol, Newport	1998
11	Linda Ujifusa	Dem	Bristol, Portsmouth	Bristol, Newport	2022
12	Louis DiPalma	Dem	Little Compton, Middletown, Newport, Tiverton	Newport	2008
13	Dawn Euer	Dem	Newport, Jamestown	Newport	2017
14	Valarie Lawson	Dem	East Providence	Providence	2018
15	Meghan Kallman	Dem	Pawtucket, Providence	Providence	2020
16	Jonathon Acosta	Dem	Central Falls, Pawtucket	Providence	2020
17	Thomas Paolino	Rep	Lincoln, North Providence, North Smithfield	Providence	2016
18	Robert Britto	Dem	East Providence, Pawtucket	Providence	2022
19	Ryan W. Pearson	Dem	Cumberland, Lincoln	Providence	2012
20	Brian Thompson	Dem	Woonsocket, Cumberland	Providence	2024
21	Gordon Rogers	Rep	Coventry, Foster, Scituate, West Greenwich	Kent, Providence	2018
22	David Tikoian	Dem	Smithfield, Lincoln, North Providence	Providence	2022
23	Jessica de la Cruz	Rep	Burrillville, Glocester, North Smithfield	Providence	2018
24	Melissa Murray	Dem	North Smithfield, Woonsocket	Providence	2018
25	Andrew Dimitri	Dem	Johnston	Providence	2024
26	Todd Patalano	Dem	Cranston	Providence	2024
27	Hanna Gallo	Dem	Cranston, West Warwick	Kent, Providence	1998
28	Lammis Vargas	Dem	Cranston, Providence	Providence	2024
29	Pete Appollonio	Dem	Warwick	Kent	2024
30	Mark McKenney	Dem	Warwick	Kent	2018
31	Matthew LaMountain	Dem	Cranston, Warwick	Kent, Providence	2022
32	Pamela J. Lauria	Dem	Barrington, Bristol, East Providence	Bristol	2022
33	Leonidas Raptakis (Note: Raptakis previously served in the state senate from 1996–2010.)	Dem	Coventry, West Greenwich	Kent	2012
34	Elaine J. Morgan	Rep	Charlestown, Exeter, Hopkinton, Richmond, West Greenwich	Kent, Washington	2014
35	Bridget Valverde	Dem	East Greenwich, North Kingstown, Narragansett, South Kingstown	Kent, Washington	2018
36	Alana DiMario	Dem	Narragansett, New Shoreham, North Kingstown	Washington	2020
37	V. Susan Sosnowski	Dem	South Kingstown	Washington	1996
38	Victoria Gu	Dem	Charlestown, South Kingstown, Westerly	Washington	2022

== South Carolina ==
Except as noted, all senators were elected in November 2024 and terms began on January 14, 2025. All terms expire in January of 2029.

District	Name	Party	Residence	Start
1	Thomas C. Alexander	Republican	Walhalla	1994 (Note: First elected in a special election.)
2	Rex Rice	Republican	Easley	2016
3	Richard Cash	Republican	Powdersville	2017
4	Michael Gambrell	Republican	Honea Path	2016
5	Tom Corbin	Republican	Travelers Rest	2012
6	Jason Elliott	Republican	Greenville	2024
7	Karl B. Allen	Democratic	Greenville	2012
8	Ross Turner	Republican	Greenville	2012
9	Danny Verdin	Republican	Laurens	2000
10	Billy Garrett	Republican	Greenwood	2020
11	Josh Kimbrell	Republican	Inman	2020
12	Lee Bright	Republican	Roebuck	2025
13	Shane Martin	Republican	Spartanburg	2008
14	Harvey S. Peeler Jr.	Republican	Gaffney	1980
15	Wes Climer	Republican	Rock Hill	2016
16	Michael Johnson	Republican	Tega Cay	2020
17	Everett Stubbs	Republican	Rock Hill	2024
18	Ronnie Cromer	Republican	Prosperity	2003
19	Tameika Isaac Devine	Democratic	Columbia	2024
20	Ed Sutton	Democratic	North Charleston	2024
21	Darrell Jackson	Democratic	Hopkins	1992
22	Overture Walker	Democratic	Columbia	2024
23	Carlisle Kennedy	Republican	Lexington	2024
24	Tom Young Jr.	Republican	Aiken	2012
25	A. Shane Massey	Republican	Edgefield	2007
26	Russell Ott	Democratic	Columbia	2024
27	Allen Blackmon	Republican	Heath Springs	2024
28	Greg Hembree	Republican	North Myrtle Beach	2012
29	JD Chaplin	Republican	Darlington	2024
30	Kent M. Williams	Democratic	Marion	2004
31	Mike Reichenbach	Republican	Florence	2022
32	Ronnie A. Sabb	Democratic	Greeleyville	2014
33	Luke A. Rankin	Republican	Conway	1992
34	Stephen Goldfinch	Republican	Murrells Inlet	2016
35	Jeffrey R. Graham	Democratic	Camden	2024
36	Jeff Zell	Republican	Sumter	2024
37	Larry Grooms	Republican	Bonneau	1997
38	Sean Bennett	Republican	Summerville	2012
39	Tom Fernandez	Republican	Summerville	2024
40	Brad Hutto	Democratic	Orangeburg	1996
41	Matt Leber	Republican	John's Island	2024
42	Deon Tedder	Democratic	Charleston	2023
43	Chip Campsen	Republican	Isle of Palms	2004
44	Brian Adams	Republican	Goose Creek	2020
45	Margie Bright Matthews	Democratic	Charleston	2015
46	Tom Davis	Republican	Beaufort	2008

== South Dakota ==
Current makeup of the South Dakota Senate

District	Name	Party	Start	Residence	Counties
1st	Michael Rohl	Republican	2021	Aberdeen	Brown, Day, Marshall, Roberts
2nd	Steve Kolbeck	Republican	2023	Brandon	Brown, Clark, Hamlin, Spink
3rd	Carl Perry	Republican	2025	Aberdeen	Brown
4th	Stephanie Sauder	Republican	2025	Bryant	Clark, Codington, Deuel, Grant, Hamlin, Roberts
5th	Glen Vilhauer	Republican	2025	Watertown	Codington
6th	Ernie Otten	Republican	2025	Tea	Lincoln
7th	Tim Reed	Republican	2023	Brookings	Brookings
8th	Casey Crabtree	Republican	2020	Madison	Lake, Miner, Moody, Sanborn
9th	Joy Hohn	Republican	2025	Hartford	Minnehaha
10th	Liz Larson	Democratic	2023	Sioux Falls	Minnehaha
11th	Chris Karr	Republican	2025	Sioux Falls	Minnehaha
12th	Arch Beal	Republican	2023	Sioux Falls	Lincoln, Minnehaha
13th	Sue Peterson	Republican	2025	Sioux Falls	Lincoln, Minnehaha
14th	Larry Zikmund	Republican	2021	Sioux Falls	Minnehaha
15th	Jamie Smith	Democratic	2025	Sioux Falls	Minnehaha
16th	Kevin Jensen	Republican	2025	Canton	Lincoln, Turner, Union
17th	Sydney Davis	Republican	2023	Burbank	Clay, Union
18th	Lauren Nelson	Republican	2025	Yankton	Clay, Yankton
19th	Kyle Schoenfish	Republican	2020	Scotland	Bon Homme, Douglas, Hanson, Hutchinson, McCook
20th	Paul Miskimins	Republican	2025	Mitchell	Davison, Jerauld, Miner, Sanborn
21st	Mykala Voita	Republican	2025	Bonesteel	Aurora, Charles Mix, Douglas, Gregory, Tripp
22nd	Brandon Wipf	Republican	2025	Lake Byron	Beadle, Kingsbury
23rd	Mark Lapka	Republican	2025	Leola	Brown, Campbell, Edmunds, Faulk, Hand, McPherson, Potter, Walworth
24th	Jim Mehlhaff	Republican	2023	Pierre	Hughes, Hyde, Stanley, Sully
25th	Tom Pischke	Republican	2023	Dell Rapids	Minnehaha
26th	Tamara Grove	Republican	2025	Lower Brule	Brule, Buffalo, Hughes, Hyde, Jones, Lyman, Mellette, Todd
27th	Red Dawn Foster	Democratic	2019 (term limited)	Pine Ridge	Bennett, Haakon, Jackson, Oglala Lakota, Pennington
28th	Sam Marty	Republican	2025	Prairie City	Butte, Corson, Dewey, Harding, Perkins, Ziebach
29th	John Carley	Republican	2025	Piedmont	Meade
30th	Amber Hulse	Republican	2025	Hot Springs	Custer, Fall River, Pennington
31st	Randy Deibert	Republican	2023	Spearfish	Lawrence
32nd	Helene Duhamel	Republican	2019 (term limited)	Rapid City	Pennington
33rd	Curt Voight	Republican	2025	Rapid City	Meade, Pennington
34th	Taffy Howard	Republican	2025	Rapid City	Pennington
35th	Greg Blanc	Republican	2025	Rapid City	Pennington

== Tennessee ==
District	Name	Party	Start	Residence	Counties
1	J. Adam Lowe	Rep	2022	Calhoun	Meigs, McMinn, Rhea, and part of Bradley
2	Tom Hatcher	Rep	2024	Maryville	Blount, Monroe, Polk, and part of Bradley
3	Rusty Crowe	Rep	1990	Johnson City	Carter, Johnson, and Washington
4	Bobby Harshbarger	Rep	2024	Kingsport	Hawkins, Sullivan
5	Randy McNally	Rep	1986	Oak Ridge	Anderson, Loudon, and part of Knox
6	Becky Duncan Massey	Rep	2011 (Note: Originally appointed or elected in a special election.)	Knoxville	Part of Knox
7	Richard Briggs	Rep	2014	Knoxville	Part of Knox
8	Jessie Seal	Rep	2024	New Tazewell	Claiborne, Grainger, Hancock, Jefferson, Union, and part of Sevier
9	Steve Southerland	Rep	2002	Morristown	Cocke, Greene, Hamblen, Unicoi, and part of Sevier
10	Todd Gardenhire	Rep	2012	Chattanooga	Bledsoe, Marion, Sequatchie, and part of Hamilton
11	Bo Watson	Rep	2006	Hixson	Part of Hamilton
12	Ken Yager	Rep	2008	Kingston	Campbell, Clay, Fentress, Macon, Morgan, Overton, Pickett, Roane, and Scott
13	Dawn White	Rep	2018	Murfreesboro	Part of Rutherford
14	Shane Reeves	Rep	2017	Murfreesboro	Bedford, Cannon, Moore, and part of Rutherford
15	Paul Bailey	Rep	2014	Sparta	Cumberland, Jackson, Putnam, Smith, Van Buren, and White
16	Janice Bowling	Rep	2012	Tullahoma	Coffee, DeKalb, Franklin, Grundy, Lincoln, and Warren
17	Mark Pody	Rep	2017	Lebanon	Wilson and part of Davidson
18	Ferrell Haile	Rep	2012	Gallatin	Sumner, and Trousdale
19	Charlane Oliver	Dem	2022	Nashville	Part of Davidson
20	Heidi Campbell	Dem	2020	Nashville	Part of Davidson
21	Jeff Yarbro	Dem	2014	Nashville	Part of Davidson
22	Bill Powers	Rep	2019	Clarksville	Part of Montgomery
23	Kerry Roberts (Note: Roberts previously served in the state senate from 2011–2013.)	Rep	2014	Springfield	Cheatham, Dickson, Hickman, Humphreys, Robertson, and part of Montgomery
24	John Stevens	Rep	2012	Huntingdon	Benton, Carroll, Gibson, Henry, Houston, Obion, Stewart, and Weakley
25	Ed Jackson	Rep	2014	Jackson	Crockett, Decatur, Dyer, Henderson, and Lake, Madison, and Perry
26	Page Walley	Rep	2020	Bolivar	Chester, Fayette, Hardeman, Hardin, Haywood, Lawrence, McNairy, and Wayne
27	Jack Johnson	Rep	2006	Franklin	Part of Williamson
28	Joey Hensley	Rep	2012	Hohenwald	Giles, Lewis, Marshall, Maury, and part of Williamson
29	Raumesh Akbari	Dem	2018	Memphis	Part of Shelby
30	Sara Kyle	Dem	2014	Memphis	Part of Shelby
31	Brent Taylor	Rep	2022	Memphis	Part of Shelby
32	Paul Rose	Rep	2019	Covington	Lauderdale, Tipton and part of Shelby
33	London Lamar	Dem	2022	Memphis	Part of Shelby

== Texas ==
District	Name	Party	Residence	Start	Next Election
1	Bryan Hughes	Republican	Mineola	2016	2026
2	Bob Hall	Republican	Edgewood	2014	2026
3	Robert Nichols	Republican	Jacksonville	2006	2026
4	Brett Ligon	Republican	Montgomery	2026 (Note: First elected in a special election.)	2026
5	Charles Schwertner	Republican	Georgetown	2012	2026
6	Carol Alvarado	Democratic	Houston	2018	2028
7	Paul Bettencourt	Republican	Houston	2014	2028
8	Angela Paxton	Republican	McKinney	2018	2028
9	Taylor Rehmet	Democratic	Fort Worth	2026	2026
10	Phil King	Republican	Weatherford	2022	2028
11	Mayes Middleton	Republican	Friendswood	2022	2026
12	Tan Parker	Republican	Flower Mound	2022	2028
13	Borris Miles	Democratic	Houston	2016	2026
14	Sarah Eckhardt	Democratic	Austin	2020	2028
15	Molly Cook	Democratic	Houston	2024	2028
16	Nathan Johnson	Democratic	Dallas	2018	2028
17	Joan Huffman	Republican	Houston	2008	2028
18	Lois Kolkhorst	Republican	Brenham	2014	2026
19	Roland Gutierrez	Democratic	San Antonio	2020	2026
20	Juan Hinojosa	Democratic	McAllen	2002	2028
21	Judith Zaffirini	Democratic	Laredo	1986	2026
22	Vacant				2026
23	Royce West	Democratic	Dallas	1992	2028
24	Pete Flores	Republican	Pleasanton	2022	2026
25	Donna Campbell	Republican	New Braunfels	2012	2028
26	Jose Menendez	Democratic	San Antonio	2015	2026
27	Adam Hinojosa	Republican	Corpus Christi	2024	2028
28	Charles Perry	Republican	Lubbock	2014	2026
29	Cesar Blanco	Democratic	El Paso	2020	2028
30	Brent Hagenbuch	Republican	Denton	2024	2028
31	Kevin Sparks	Republican	Midland	2022	2026

== Utah ==
District	Name	Party	Start	Next Election	Counties	Residence
1	Scott Sandall	Rep	2018	2026	Box Elder, Cache, Tooele	Tremonton
2	Chris H. Wilson	Rep	2020	2028	Cache, Rich	Logan
3	John Johnson	Rep	2020	2028	Morgan, Summit, Weber	North Ogden
4	Cal Musselman	Rep	2024	2028	Davis, Weber	West Haven
5	Ann Millner	Rep	2014	2026	Davis, Morgan, Weber	Ogden
6	Jerry Stevenson	Rep	2010 (Note: Originally appointed.)	2026	Davis	Layton
7	J. Stuart Adams	Rep	2009	2026	Davis	Layton
8	Todd Weiler	Rep	2012	2028	Davis, Salt Lake	Woods Cross
9	Jen Plumb	Dem	2022	2026	Salt Lake	Salt Lake City
10	Luz Escamilla	Dem	2008	2028	Salt Lake	Salt Lake City
11	Emily Buss	FWD	2025	2026	Salt Lake	Eagle Mountain
12	Karen Kwan	Dem	2023	2026	Salt Lake	Taylorsville
13	Nate Blouin	Dem	2022	2026	Salt Lake	Millcreek
14	Stephanie Pitcher	Dem	2022	2026	Salt Lake	Salt Lake City
15	Kathleen Riebe	Dem	2018	2028	Salt Lake	Cottonwood Heights
16	Wayne Harper	Rep	2012	2028	Salt Lake	Taylorsville
17	Lincoln Fillmore	Rep	2016	2028	Salt Lake	South Jordan
18	Daniel McCay	Rep	2018	2026	Salt Lake, Utah	Riverton
19	Kirk Cullimore Jr.	Rep	2018	2026	Salt Lake, Utah	Sandy
20	Ronald Winterton	Rep	2018	2026	Daggett, Duchesne, Summit, Uintah, Wasatch	Roosevelt
21	Brady Brammer	Rep	2025	2026	Utah	Pleasant Grove
22	Heidi Balderree	Rep	2023	2028	Salt Lake, Utah	Saratoga Springs
23	Keith Grover	Rep	2018	2026	Utah	Provo
24	Keven Stratton	Rep	2024	2028	Utah, Wasatch	Orem
25	Mike McKell	Rep	2020	2028	Utah	Spanish Fork
26	David Hinkins	Rep	2008	2028	Carbon, Emery, Garfield, Grand, Kane, San Juan, Utah, Wasatch, Wayne	Orangeville
27	Derrin Owens	Rep	2020	2028	Garfield, Juab, Kane, Millard, Piute, Sanpete, Sevier, Utah, Washington, Wayne	Fountain Green
28	Evan Vickers	Rep	2012	2026	Beaver, Iron, Juab, Millard, Washington	Cedar City
29	Don Ipson	Rep	2016	2028	Washington	St. George

== Vermont ==
District	Name	Party	Residence	Start
Addison	Steven Heffernan	Rep	Bristol	2024
Addison	Ruth Hardy	Dem	East Middlebury	2018
Bennington	Seth Bongartz (Note: Bongartz previously served in the state senate from 1987–1989.)	Dem	Manchester	2024
Bennington	Robert Plunkett	Dem	Bennington	2024
Caledonia	Scott Beck	Rep	St. Johnsbury	2024
Chittenden-Central	Philip Baruth	Dem/Prog	Burlington	2010
Chittenden-Central	Martine Gulick	Dem	Burlington	2022
Chittenden-Central	Tanya Vyhovsky	Prog/Dem	Essex	2022
Chittenden-North	Chris Mattos	Rep	Milton	2024
Chittenden-Southeast	Thomas Chittenden	Dem	South Burlington	2020
Chittenden-Southeast	Virginia V. Lyons	Dem	Williston	2000
Chittenden-Southeast	Kesha Ram Hinsdale	Dem	Shelburne	2020
Essex	Russ Ingalls	Rep	Newport	2020
Franklin	Randy Brock (Note: Brock previously served in the state senate from 2009–2013.)	Rep	Swanton	2017 (Note: Originally appointed.)
Franklin	Robert Norris	Rep	Sheldon	2022
Grand Isle	Patrick Brennan	Rep	Colchester	2024
Lamoille	Richard A. Westman	Rep	Hyde Park	2010
Orange	John Benson	Rep	Brookfield	2026
Orleans	John Morley	Rep	Orleans	2025
Rutland	Brian Collamore	Rep	Rutland Town	2014
Rutland	Dave Weeks	Rep	Proctor	2022
Rutland	Terry Williams	Rep	Poultney	2022
Washington	Ann Cummings	Dem	Montpelier	1996
Washington	Andrew Perchlik	Dem/Prog	Montpelier	2018
Washington	Anne Watson	Dem/Prog	Montpelier	2022
Windham	Wendy Harrison	Dem	Brattleboro	2022
Windham	Nader Hashim	Dem	Dummerston	2022
Windsor	Alison H. Clarkson	Dem	Woodstock	2016
Windsor	Joe Major	Dem	Hartford	2024
Windsor	Rebecca White	Dem	Hartford	2022

== Virginia ==
District	Name	Party	Areas represented		Start
District	Name	Party	Counties	Cities	Start
1	Timmy French	Republican	Clarke, Frederick, Shenandoah, Warren	Winchester	2023
2	Mark Obenshain	Republican	Augusta (part), Bath, Highland, Page, Rockingham	Harrisonburg	2003
3	Chris Head	Republican	Alleghany, Augusta (part), Bedford (part), Botetourt, Craig, Roanoke (part), Rockbridge	Buena Vista, Covington, Lexington, Staunton, Waynesboro	2023
4	Dave Suetterlein	Republican	Montgomery (part), Roanoke (part)	Roanoke, Salem	2015
5	Travis Hackworth	Republican	Bland, Giles, Montgomery (part), Pulaski, Smyth, Tazewell, Wythe (part)	Radford	2021 (special)
6	Todd Pillion	Republican	Buchanan, Dickenson, Lee, Russell, Scott, Washington, Wise	Bristol, Norton	2019
7	Bill Stanley	Republican	Carroll, Floyd, Franklin, Grayson, Henry, Patrick, Wythe (part)	Martinsville, Galax	2011 (special)
8	Mark Peake	Republican	Bedford (part), Campbell	Lynchburg	2017 (special)
9	Tammy Brankley Mulchi	Republican	Charlotte, Halifax, Lunenburg, Mecklenburg, Nottoway, Pittsylvania, Prince Edward (part)	Danville	2024 (special)
10	Luther Cifers	Republican	Amelia, Appomattox, Buckingham, Cumberland, Fluvanna, Goochland, Hanover (part), Henrico (part), Louisa (part), Powhatan, Prince Edward (part)		2025 (special)
11	Creigh Deeds	Democratic	Albemarle, Amherst, Louisa (part), Nelson	Charlottesville	2001 (special)
12	Glen Sturtevant	Republican	Chesterfield (part)	Colonial Heights	2015
13	Lashrecse Aird	Democratic	Charles City, Dinwiddie (part), Henrico (part), Prince George, Surry, Sussex	Hopewell, Petersburg	2023
14	Lamont Bagby	Democratic	Henrico (part)	Richmond (part)	2023 (special)
15	Michael Jones	Democratic	Chesterfield (part)	Richmond (part)	2026 (special)
16	Schuyler VanValkenburg	Democratic	Henrico (part)		2023
17	Emily Jordan	Republican	Brunswick, Dinwiddie (part), Greensville, Isle of Wight, Southampton	Chesapeake (part), Emporia, Franklin, Portsmouth (part), Suffolk	2023
18	Louise Lucas	Democratic		Chesapeake (part), Portsmouth (part)	1991
19	Christie New Craig	Republican		Chesapeake (part), Virginia Beach (part)	2023
20	Bill DeSteph	Republican	Accomack, Northampton	Norfolk (part), Virginia Beach (part)	2015
21	Angelia Williams Graves	Democratic		Norfolk (part)	2023
22	Aaron Rouse	Democratic		Virginia Beach (part)	2023 (special)
23	Mamie Locke	Democratic		Hampton, Newport News (part)	2003
24	Danny Diggs	Republican	James City (part), York	Newport News (part), Poquoson, Williamsburg	2023
25	Richard Stuart	Republican	Caroline, Essex, King & Queen (part), King George, King William, Lancaster, Middlesex, Northumberland, Richmond, Spotsylvania (part), Westmoreland		2007
26	Ryan McDougle	Republican	Gloucester, Hanover (part), James City (part), King & Queen (part), Mathews, New Kent		2006 (special)
27	Tara Durant	Republican	Spotsylvania (part), Stafford (part)	Fredericksburg	2023
28	Bryce Reeves	Republican	Culpeper, Fauquier (part), Greene, Madison, Orange, Rappahannock, Spotsylvania (part)		2011
29	Jeremy McPike	Democratic	Prince William (part), Stafford (part)		2015
30	Danica Roem	Democratic	Prince William (part)	Manassas, Manassas Park	2023
31	Russet Perry	Democratic	Fauquier (part), Loudoun (part)		2023
32	Kannan Srinivasan	Democratic	Loudoun (part)		2025 (special)
33	Jennifer Carroll Foy	Democratic	Fairfax (part), Prince William (part)		2023
34	Scott Surovell	Democratic	Fairfax (part)		2015
35	Dave Marsden	Democratic	Fairfax (part)		2010 (special)
36	Stella Pekarsky	Democratic	Fairfax (part)		2023
37	Saddam Azlan Salim	Democratic	Fairfax (part)	Fairfax, Falls Church	2023
38	Jennifer Boysko	Democratic	Fairfax (part)		2019 (special)
39	Elizabeth Bennett-Parker	Democratic	Arlington (part), Fairfax (part)	Alexandria	2026 (special)
40	Barbara Favola	Democratic	Arlington (part)		2011

== Washington ==
District	Name	Party	Residence	Counties	First Election	Next Election
1	Derek Stanford	Democratic	Maltby	King (part), Snohomish (part)	2019 (Note: Originally appointed.)	2028
2	Jim McCune	Republican	Graham	Pierce (part), Thurston (part)	2020	2028
3	Marcus Riccelli	Democratic	Spokane	Spokane (part)	2024	2028
4	Leonard Christian	Republican	Spokane Valley	Spokane (part)	2024	2028
5	Victoria Hunt	Democratic	Issaquah	King (part)	2025	2028
6	Jeff Holy	Republican	Spokane	Spokane (part)	2018	2026
7	Shelly Short	Republican	Addy	Douglas (part), Ferry, Grant (part), Okanogan (part), Pend Oreille, Spokane (part), Stevens	2017	2026
8	Matt Boehnke	Republican	Kennewick	Benton (part), Franklin (part)	2022	2026
9	Mark Schoesler	Republican	Ritzville	Adams (part), Asotin, Columbia, Franklin (part), Garfield, Lincoln, Spokane (part), Whitman	2004	2028
10	Ron Muzzall	Republican	Oak Harbor	Island, Skagit (part), Snohomish (part)	2019	2028
11	Bob Hasegawa	Democratic	Seattle	King (part)	2012	2028
12	Keith Goehner	Republican	Dryden	Chelan, Douglas (part), King (part), Snohomish (part)	2024	2028
13	Judy Warnick	Republican	Moses Lake	Grant (part), Kittitas, Yakima (part)	2014	2026
14	Curtis King	Republican	Yakima	Klickitat, Yakima (part)	2007 (Note: Originally elected in a special election.)	2028
15	Nikki Torres	Republican	Pasco	Adams (part), Benton (part), Franklin (part), Grant (part), Yakima (part)	2022	2026
16	Perry Dozier	Republican	Waitsburg	Benton (part), Walla Walla	2020	2028
17	Paul Harris	Republican	Vancouver	Clark (part), Skamania	2024	2028
18	Adrian Cortes	Democratic	La Center	Clark (part)	2024	2028
19	Jeff Wilson	Republican	Longview	Cowlitz (part), Grays Harbor (part), Lewis (part), Pacific, Thurston (part), Wahkiakum	2020	2028
20	John Braun	Republican	Centralia	Clark (part), Cowlitz (part), Lewis (part), Thurston (part)	2012	2028
21	Marko Liias	Democratic	Lynnwood	Snohomish (part)	2014	2026
22	Jessica Bateman	Democratic	Olympia	Thurston (part)	2024	2028
23	Drew Hansen	Democratic	Bainbridge Island	Kitsap (part)	2023	2028
24	Mike Chapman	Democratic	Port Angeles	Clallam, Grays Harbor (part), Jefferson	2024 (Note: Sworn in early to fill vacant seat.)	2028
25	Chris Gildon	Republican	Puyallup	Pierce (part)	2020	2028
26	Deborah Krishnadasan	Democratic	Gig Harbor	Kitsap (part), Pierce (part)	2024	2026
27	Yasmin Trudeau	Democratic	Tacoma	Pierce (part)	2021	2028
28	T'wina Nobles	Democratic	Fircrest	Pierce (part)	2020	2028
29	Steve Conway	Democratic	Tacoma	Pierce (part)	2010	2026
30	Claire Wilson	Democratic	Auburn	King (part)	2018	2026
31	Phil Fortunato	Republican	Auburn	King (part), Pierce (part)	2017	2026
32	Jesse Salomon	Democratic	Shoreline	King (part), Snohomish (part)	2018	2026
33	Tina Orwall	Democratic	Des Moines	King (part)	2024	2026
34	Emily Alvarado	Democratic	West Seattle	King (part)	2025	2026
35	Drew MacEwen	Republican	Union	Kitsap (part), Mason, Thurston (part)	2022	2026
36	Noel Frame	Democratic	Seattle	King (part)	2022	2026
37	Rebecca Saldaña	Democratic	Seattle	King (part)	2016	2026
38	June Robinson	Democratic	Everett	Snohomish (part)	2020	2026
39	Keith Wagoner	Republican	Sedro-Woolley	Skagit (part), Snohomish (part)	2018	2028
40	Liz Lovelett	Democratic	Anacortes	San Juan, Skagit (part), Whatcom (part)	2019	2028
41	Lisa Wellman	Democratic	Mercer Island	King (part)	2016	2028
42	Sharon Shewmake	Democratic	Bellingham	Whatcom (part)	2022	2026
43	Jamie Pedersen	Democratic	Seattle	King (part)	2013	2026
44	John Lovick	Democratic	Mill Creek	Snohomish (part)	2021	2026
45	Manka Dhingra	Democratic	Redmond	King (part)	2017	2026
46	Javier Valdez	Democratic	Seattle	King (part)	2022	2026
47	Claudia Kauffman	Democratic	Kent	King (part)	2022	2026
48	Vandana Slatter	Democratic	Bellevue	King (part)	2025	2026
49	Annette Cleveland	Democratic	Vancouver	Clark (part)	2012	2028

== West Virginia ==
District	Next Election	Name	Party	Start	Residence	Home City (Note: Multi-county districts (all but the 17th district) must elect senators from different counties.)	Counties
1	2026	Laura Chapman	Republican	2022	Wheeling	Ohio	Brooke, Hancock, Marshall, Ohio
1	2028	Ryan Weld	Republican	2016	Wellsburg	Brooke	Brooke, Hancock, Marshall, Ohio
2	2026	Charles H. Clements	Republican	2016	New Martinsville	Wetzel	Doddridge, Marion, Marshall, Monongalia, Wetzel, Tyler
2	2028	Chris Rose	Republican	2024	Maidsville	Monongalia	Doddridge, Marion, Marshall, Monongalia, Wetzel, Tyler
3	2026	Mike Azinger	Republican	2016	Vienna	Wood	Pleasants, Ritchie, Wirt, Wood
3	2026 (special)	Trenton Barnhart	Republican	2026	St. Marys	Pleasants	Pleasants, Ritchie, Wirt, Wood
4	2026	Eric Tarr	Republican	2018	Scott Depot	Putnam	Cabell, Jackson, Mason, Putnam
4	2028	Amy Grady	Republican	2020	Leon	Mason	Cabell, Jackson, Mason, Putnam
5	2026	Mike Woelfel	Democratic	2014	Huntington	Cabell	Cabell, Wayne
5	2028	Scott Fuller	Republican	2024	Kenova	Wayne	Cabell, Wayne
6	2026	Mark R. Maynard	Republican	2014	Genoa	Wayne	McDowell, Mercer, Mingo, Wayne
6	2028	Craig A. Hart	Republican	2024	Lenore	Mingo	McDowell, Mercer, Mingo, Wayne
7	2026	Zack Maynard	Republican	2025	Harts	Lincoln	Boone, Kanawha, Lincoln, Logan
7	2028	Rupie Phillips	Republican	2020	Lorado	Logan	Boone, Kanawha, Lincoln, Logan
8	2026	T. Kevan Bartlett	Republican	2025	Sissonville	Kanawha	Clay, Jackson, Kanawha, Putnam, Roane
8	2028	Glenn Jeffries	Republican	2016	Red House	Putnam	Clay, Jackson, Kanawha, Putnam, Roane
9	2026	Rollan Roberts	Republican	2018	Beaver	Raleigh	Fayette, Raleigh, Wyoming
9	2028	Brian Helton	Republican	2024	Mount Hope	Fayette	Fayette, Raleigh, Wyoming
10	2026	Vince Deeds	Republican	2022	Renick	Greenbrier	Fayette, Greenbrier, Monroe, Nicholas, Summers
10	2028	Jack Woodrum	Republican	2020	Hinton	Summers	Fayette, Greenbrier, Monroe, Nicholas, Summers
11	2026	Bill Hamilton	Republican	2018	Buckhannon	Upshur	Barbour, Braxton, Pendleton, Pocahontas, Randolph, Upshur, Webster
11	2028	Robbie Morris	Republican	2024	Elkins	Randolph	Barbour, Braxton, Pendleton, Pocahontas, Randolph, Upshur, Webster
12	2026	Ben Queen	Republican	2022	Bridgeport	Harrison	Calhoun, Gilmer, Harrison, Lewis, Taylor
12	2028	Patrick S. Martin	Republican	2020	Weston	Lewis	Calhoun, Gilmer, Harrison, Lewis, Taylor
13	2026	Mike Oliverio	Republican	2022 (Note: Oliverio previously served in the Senate from 1994 to 2010.)	Morgantown	Monongalia	Marion, Monongalia
13	2028	Joey Garcia	Democratic	2024	Fairmont	Marion	Marion, Monongalia
14	2026	Jay Taylor	Republican	2022	Grafton	Taylor	Grant, Hardy, Mineral, Preston, Taylor, Tucker
14	2028	Randy Smith	Republican	2016	Thomas	Tucker	Grant, Hardy, Mineral, Preston, Taylor, Tucker
15	2026	Darren Thorne	Republican	2024	Romney	Hampshire	Berkeley, Hampshire, Morgan
15	2028	Tom Willis	Republican	2024	Martinsburg	Berkeley	Berkeley, Hampshire, Morgan
16	2026	Jason Barrett	Republican	2022	Martinsburg	Berkeley	Berkeley, Jefferson
16	2028	Patricia Rucker	Republican	2016	Harpers Ferry	Jefferson	Berkeley, Jefferson
17	2026	Tom Takubo	Republican	2014	Charleston	Kanawha	Kanawha
17	2026 (special)	Anne Charnock	Republican	2025	Charleston	Kanawha	Kanawha

== Wisconsin ==
District	Name	Party	Residence	Start	Next Election
1	André Jacque	Rep	New Franken	2018	2026
2	Eric Wimberger	Rep	Oconto	2020	2028
3	Tim Carpenter	Dem	Milwaukee	2002	2026
4	Dora Drake	Dem	Milwaukee	2024 (special)	2028
5	Rob Hutton	Rep	Brookfield	2022	2026
6	LaTonya Johnson	Dem	Milwaukee	2016	2028
7	Chris Larson	Dem	Milwaukee	2010	2026
8	Jodi Habush Sinykin	Dem	Whitefish Bay	2024	2028
9	Devin LeMahieu	Rep	Oostburg	2014	2026
10	Rob Stafsholt	Rep	New Richmond	2020	2028
11	Stephen Nass	Rep	Whitewater	2014	2026
12	Mary Felzkowski	Rep	Tomahawk	2020	2028
13	John Jagler	Rep	Watertown	2021 (special)	2026
14	Sarah Keyeski	Dem	Lodi	2024	2028
15	Mark Spreitzer	Dem	Beloit	2022	2026
16	Melissa Ratcliff	Dem	Cottage Grove	2024	2028
17	Howard Marklein	Rep	Spring Green	2014	2026
18	Kristin Dassler-Alfheim	Dem	Appleton	2024	2028
19	Rachael Cabral-Guevara	Rep	Appleton	2022	2026
20	Dan Feyen	Rep	Fond du Lac	2016	2028
21	Van H. Wanggaard	Rep	Racine	2014	2026
22	Robert Wirch	Dem	Pleasant Prairie	1996	2028
23	Jesse James	Rep	Thorp	2022	2026
24	Patrick Testin	Rep	Stevens Point	2016	2028
25	Romaine Quinn	Rep	Birchwood	2022	2026
26	Kelda Roys	Dem	Madison	2020	2028
27	Dianne Hesselbein	Dem	Middleton	2022	2026
28	Julian Bradley	Rep	New Berlin	2020	2028
29	Cory Tomczyk	Rep	Mosinee	2022	2026
30	Jamie Wall	Dem	Green Bay	2024	2028
31	Jeff Smith	Dem	Brunswick	2018	2026
32	Brad Pfaff	Dem	Onalaska	2020	2028
33	Chris Kapenga	Rep	Delafield	2015 (special)	2026

== Wyoming ==
District	Name	Party	Residence	Counties	Nested House Districts	Start	Next Election
1	Ogden Driskill	Republican	Devils Tower	Campbell, Crook, Weston	HD 1, HD 52	2010	2026
2	Brian Boner	Republican	Douglas	Converse, Platte	HD 6, HD 62	2015 (Note: Originally appointed.)	2028
3	Cheri Steinmetz	Republican	Lingle	Goshen, Niobrara, Weston	HD 2, HD 5	2018	2026
4	Tara Nethercott	Republican	Cheyenne	Laramie	HD 7, HD 8	2016	2028
5	Lynn Hutchings	Republican	Cheyenne	Laramie	HD 12, HD 42	2018	2026
6	Taft Love	Republican	Cheyenne	Laramie	HD 4, HD 10	2025	2026 (special)
7	Stephan Pappas	Republican	Cheyenne	Laramie	HD 9, HD 41	2014	2026
8	Jared Olsen	Republican	Cheyenne	Laramie	HD 11, HD 44	2024	2028
9	Chris Rothfuss	Democratic	Laramie	Albany	HD 13, HD 45	2010	2026
10	Gary Crum	Republican	Laramie	Albany	HD 14, HD 46	2024	2028
11	Larry S. Hicks	Republican	Baggs	Albany, Carbon	HD 13, HD 45	2010	2026
12	John Kolb	Republican	Rock Springs	Fremont, Sweetwater	HD 17, HD 48	2020	2028
13	Stacy Jones	Republican	Rock Springs	Sweetwater	HD 39, HD 60	2022	2026
14	Laura Taliaferro Pearson	Republican	Kemmerer	Lincoln, Sublette, Sweetwater, Uinta	HD 18, HD 20	2024	2028
15	Wendy Davis Schuler	Republican	Evanston	Uinta	HD 19, HD 49	2018	2026
16	Dan Dockstader	Republican	Afton	Lincoln, Sublette, Teton	HD 21, HD 22	2008	2028
17	Mike Gierau	Democratic	Jackson Hole	Teton	HD 16, HD 23	2018	2026
18	Tim French	Republican	Powell	Park	HD 24, HD 50	2020	2028
19	Dan Laursen	Republican	Powell	Big Horn, Park	HD 25, HD 26	2014	2026
20	Ed Cooper	Republican	Ten Sleep	Big Horn, Hot Springs, Park, Washakie	HD 27, HD 28	2020	2028
21	Bo Biteman	Republican	Ranchester	Sheridan	HD 29, HD 30, HD 40, HD 51 (Note: Only two senate districts not nested.)	2018	2026
22	Barry Crago	Republican	Buffalo	Sheridan, Johnson	HD 29, HD 30, HD 40, HD 51	2024	2028
23	Eric Barlow	Republican	Gillette	Campbell	HD 3, HD 31	2022	2026
24	Troy McKeown	Republican	Gillette	Campbell	HD 32, HD 53	2020	2028
25	Cale Case	Republican	Lander	Fremont	HD 33, HD 54	1998	2026
26	Tim Salazar	Republican	Riverton	Fremont	HD 34, HD 55	2020	2028
27	Bill Landen	Republican	Casper	Natrona	HD 35, HD 36	2007	2026
28	James Anderson	Republican	Casper	Natrona	HD 56, HD 57	2012	2028
29	Bob Ide	Republican	Casper	Natrona	HD 37, HD 59	2022	2026
30	Charles Scott	Republican	Casper	Natrona	HD 38, HD 58	1982	2028
31	Evie Brennan	Republican	Cheyenne	Laramie	HD 43, HD 61	2022	2026

== See also ==
- List of United States state legislatures
- List of U.S. state representatives (Alabama to Missouri)
- List of U.S. state representatives (Montana to Wyoming)
