= List of political parties in the United States =

This list of political parties in the United States identifies notable political parties in the United States, both past and present, both major and minor. Notes:

- The list does not include independents, whose notable election runs can be found at list of independent performances in United States elections.
- Voter registration numbers below should be taken as a lower bound, because not all states allow public access to voter registration data.
- Abbreviations come from the parties themselves and from state ballots used in the most recent elections. Not all parties have abbreviations.
- Ballot access comes from a variety of sources including Ballotpedia, The Green Papers, and various state Secretaries of State.
- The "political positions" and "ideology" for each party merely repeat the main article on that political party. For example, if the Democratic Party (United States) page states "center to center-left" and "liberalism", this page will repeat that.
- For political parties in Puerto Rico, an unincorporated territory of the US, see List of political parties in Puerto Rico.

== Active parties ==
=== Major parties ===
Both major parties below have ballot access in all 50 states and the District of Columbia.

Party	Political position (Note: The "political positions" and "ideology" for each party merely repeat the main article on that political party. For example, if the Democratic Party (United States) page states "center to center-left" and "liberalism", this page will repeat that.)	Ideology	Registered voters (July 2026)	Presidential vote (2024)		Legislators (federal and state)		
Party	Political position	Ideology	Registered voters (July 2026)	Electoral	Popular (Note: Presidential vote comes from two sources: For major parties, the Federal Election Commission provides the final, official popular vote total and electoral college vote total. See also the New York Times breakdown. For minor parties, The Green Pages provides a breakdown for all parties, including write-ins and electoral fusion tickets, based on preliminary results.)	Senate	House	State legislators
Republican Party (R; GOP); 1854–	Right-wing to far-right	Right-wing populism American neo-nationalism	37,877,051 (29.80%)	312 / 538	77,302,580 (49.8%)	44 / 100	172 / 435	4,031 / 7,383
Democratic Party (D; DEM); 1828–	Center to center-left	Liberalism (US)	44,417,573 (34.96%)	226 / 538	75,017,613 (48.32%)	56 / 100 (Note: Includes two Independent Senators who both caucus with the Democratic Party.)	257 / 435	3,271 / 7,383

=== Third parties ===
==== Represented in state legislatures ====
The third parties below have some affiliated members in state legislatures. For political parties in Puerto Rico's legislature, see List of political parties in Puerto Rico.

Party	Political position	Ideology	Presidential election		General elections		State and local electeds	
Party	Political position	Ideology	Ballot access	Votes	Ballot access	Reg. voters	State legislators	Local legislators and executives (Note: The total number of local legislative and local executive seats is based on the best data available and is not exact.)
Working Families Party (WFP); 1998–	Center-left to left-wing	Left-wing populism Progressivism	3 / 51 (Note: In the 2024 United States Presidential election, WFP endorsed Kamala Harris. In Oregon, Harris appeared on a single ballot line with both the Democratic and Working Families parties listed. In New York and Connecticut, Harris appeared on a separate ballot line with votes counting in a fusion ticket.)	4,619,195 (2.99%)	3 / 51	69,363 (0.05%)	159 / 7,383 (Note: The Working Families Party uses electoral fusion to cross-endorse progressive Democratic Party candidates in Connecticut, New York, and Oregon, running on a Dem-WFP fusion ballot. No WFP candidate for state legislature has been elected on a WFP line alone, but some local candidates have been elected on the WFP line alone. This count includes all Dem-WFP state legislature electeds in CT, NY, and OR. For additional details: CT: Ballotpedia (House 47, Senate 15), see also 2024 Connecticut House of Representatives election and 2024 Connecticut Senate election.; NY: Ballotpedia (Assembly 50, Senate 28), see also 2024 New York State Assembly election and 2024 New York State Senate election.; OR: Ballotpedia (House 16, Senate 3), see also 2024 Oregon House of Representatives election and 2024 Oregon State Senate election.)	
Vermont Progressive Party (VPP); 1993–	Left-wing	Democratic socialism Social democracy Progressivism (US); Environmentalism	Vermont	n/a (Note: VPP did not run or endorse a candidate in the 2024 Presidential election.)	Vermont	n/a (Note: Vermont does not register voters by party.)	12 / 180 (Note: The Vermont Progressive Party uses electoral fusion to cross-endorse progressive Democratic Party candidates in Vermont, running on a Dem-VPP fusion ballot. No VPP candidate for state legislature has been elected on a VPP line alone, but most local candidates have been elected on the VPP line alone. This count includes all Dem-VPP and VPP-only electeds: VT state legislature: VPP lists 4 state senators and 8 state representatives, Ballotpedia lists 4 state senators and 9 state representatives. Troy Headrick switched from VPP to Independent in 2025. See also 2024 Vermont House of Representatives election and 2024 Vermont Senate election.; VT local elected positions: VPP lists 10 city council and selectboard elected officials.)	10 / 636
Green Party (G; GRE); 1996–	Left-wing	Green politics Progressivism (US); Eco-socialism	37 / 51	813,066 (0.53%)	20 / 51	255,119 (0.2%)	1 / 7,383	46 / 188,409 (Elected officials)
Forward Party (FWD); 2022–	Center	Populism (US); Reformism; Decentralization	0 / 51 (Note: The Forward Party did not run or endorse a Presidential candidate in 2024.)	0 (0%)	6 / 51	6,068 (0%)	1 / 7,383	28 / 188,409

==== Represented in local governments ====
The third parties below have affiliated members in local legislatures (such as city council or county commission) or local executives (such as mayor). Only "general purpose" governments are included, while "specific purpose" governments (like school board or fire district) are excluded.

Party	Political position	Ideology	Presidential election		General elections		Local electeds
Party	Political position	Ideology	Ballot access	Votes	Ballot access	Reg. voters	Local legislators and executives
Libertarian Party (LIB); 1971–	Right-wing	Libertarianism; Right-libertarianism; Cultural liberalism	47 / 51	646,123 (0.42%)	32 / 51	695,779 (0.55%)	21 / 188,409 (Elected officials)
Constitution Party (CON); 1990–	Far-right	Christian right Christian reconstructivism Ultraconservatism; Paleoconservatism; Social conservatism Fiscal conservatism	12 / 51	54,053 (0.03%) (Note: The Constitution Party had two candidates running for the 2024 presidential election—one which was nominated by the party and one which was nominated by the Constitution Party dissidents.)	11 / 51	145,511 (0.11%)	17 / 188,409
American Solidarity Party (ASP); 2011–	Syncretic	Christian democracy Social conservatism (US); Economic progressivism	7 / 51	32,654 (0.02%)	2 / 51	7,329 (0.01%)	2 / 188,409
Communist Party USA (CPUSA); 1919–	Far-left	Communism (US); Marxism–Leninism; Bill of Rights socialism	0 / 51 (Note: CPUSA has not run federal candidates on the Communist Party ballot line since 1988.)	0 (0%)	0 / 51	23 (0%)	3 / 188,409 (Elected officials)
Alliance Party; 2018–	Center-left	Anti-corruption; Electoral reform	32 / 51	754,980 (0.49%) (Note: In an example of electoral fusion, the Alliance Party, American Independent Party, Natural Law Party, and Reform Party all nominated Robert F. Kennedy Jr, who later dropped out. However, he remained on the ballot in other states.)	2 / 51	0 (0%)	1 / 188,409

==== Other parties with ballot access ====
The third parties below have ballot access in at least one state and are not represented in a national office, state/territorial legislature or county office.

===== Multi-state =====
The following third parties are active in multiple states.

Party	Political position	Ideology	Presidential election		General elections	
Party	Political position	Ideology	Ballot access	Votes	Ballot access	Reg. voters
No Labels; 2010–	Center	Bipartisanship	4 / 50	No candidate	7 / 50	55,038
Legal Marijuana Now Party (LMN); 1998–	Single-issue	Cannabis legalization	No candidate	No candidate	2 / 50	9,967
Working Class Party (WCP); 2016–	Left-wing	Progressivism; Socialism	No candidate	No candidate	2 / 50	3,751
Approval Voting Party (AVP); 2016–	Single-issue	Electoral reform	1 / 50	5,173	1 / 50	2,196
Liberal Party USA (LPU); 2022–	Center	Classical liberalism	1 / 50	15,040	1 / 50	859 (0.0006%)
Natural Law Party (NLP); 1992–	Single-issue	Transcendental Meditation; Civil libertarianism Environmentalism	32 / 50	754,980 (0.49%)	1 / 50	5,271
Party for Socialism and Liberation (PSL); 2004–	Far-left	Communism; Marxism–Leninism	19 / 50	154,538 (0.100%) (Note: The Party for Socialism and Liberation, and Peace and Freedom Party, and South Carolina Workers Party all collectively endorsed Claudia de la Cruz. De le Cruz is a PSL member.)	1 / 50	2,181
Unity Party; 2004–	Center		No candidate	No candidate	1 / 50 (Note: Disaffiliated)	3,181

===== Single-state =====
The following third parties are only active in one state.

Party	Political position	Ideology	Presidential election		General elections	
Party	Political position	Ideology	Ballot access	Votes	Ballot access	Reg. voters
American Independent Party (AIP); 1967–	Far-right	Ultraconservatism	California	754,980 (0.49%)	California	939,695 (Note: The vast majority of voters registered as AIP did so accidentally, believing "American Independent" to mean "no party".)
Peace and Freedom Party (PAF; PFP); 1967–	Left-wing	Eco-socialism; Pacifism; Socialist feminism	California	154,538 (0.10%)	California	148,494
Independent Party of Florida (IPF); 1993–	Center	Big tent	No candidate	No candidate	Florida	292,607
Ecology Party of Florida; 2008–		Anti-vaccination; Climate change denial Regionalism	No candidate	No candidate	Florida	3,564
Conservative Party of New York State; 1962–	Right-wing	Conservatism (US)	New York	3,578,899 (Note: The Conservative Party of New York endorsed Donald Trump in the 2024 elections. Using an electoral fusion ballot line, people voted for Trump on the Conservative line.)	New York	161,187
Colorado Center Party; 2022–	Center	Syncretic politics Centrism; Electoral reform	No candidate	No candidate	Colorado	3,921
United Citizens Party (UC; UCP); 1969–	Center-left to left-wing	Progressivism (US); Black nationalism	South Carolina	84,588 (0.055%) (Note: The Green Mountain Peace and Justice Party, Oregon Progressive Party, and United Citizens Party endorsed Cornel West. Votes counted in a fusion ticket.)	South Carolina	n/a (Note: South Carolina does not register voters by political party.)
South Carolina Workers Party (SCWP); 1996–	Left-wing	Labourism; Progressivism; Socialism	South Carolina	154,538 (0.100%)	South Carolina	n/a
Independent Party of Oregon (IPO); 2007–	Center	Social liberalism Big tent	No candidate	No candidate	Oregon	154,743
Oregon Progressive Party (OPP); 2007–	Center-left	Progressivism; Social democracy Environmentalism	Oregon	84,588 (0.055%)	Oregon	4,063
United Kansas; 2024–	Center	Fusion voting	No candidate	No candidate	Kansas	946
Utah Independent American Party (UIAP); 1993–	Far-right	Ultraconservatism; Paleoconservatism; Anti-socialism; Mormon interests	No candidate	No candidate	Utah	79,391
Independent Party of Delaware (IDE; IPoD); 2000–			No candidate	No candidate	Delaware	12,343
Green Mountain Peace and Justice Party (GMPJP); 1970–	Left-wing	Socialism; Eco-socialism; Anti-capitalism; Environmentalism	Vermont	84,588 (0.055%)	Vermont	n/a
America First Party (AFP); 2026–	Right-wing	Conservatism; American nationalism	No candidate	No candidate	Nebraska	

==== Active parties without ballot access ====
The following parties remain active but do not have official ballot access in any state.

===== Multi-state =====
Party	Year founded	Political position	Ideology	Registered voters (2025)	Presidential vote (2024)
Reform Party	1995	Center	Radical centrism	2,696	754,980 (0.49%)
Socialist Workers Party (SWP)	1938	Far-left	Communism; Trotskyism; Fidelismo	795	4,118 (0.003%)
Prohibition Party (P; PRO)	1869	Syncretic; Social: Center-right; Fiscal: Center-left	Temperance; Christian democracy	22	1,144 (0.0007%)
Socialist Equality Party (SEP)	1966	Far-left	Communism; Trotskyism	Unknown	4,638 (0.003%)
Socialist Party USA (SOC; SPUSA)	1973	Left-wing	Democratic socialism; Radical democracy; Socialist feminism; Eco-socialism	9,062	361 (0.0002%)
United States Pirate Party (USPP)	2006	Syncretic	Pirate politics; Civil libertarianism; Direct democracy	721	914 (0.0006%)
American Communist Party (ACP)	2024	Syncretic	Marxism–Leninism; MAGA communism	Unknown	
Progressive Labor Party (PLP)	1962	Far-left	Communism; Marxism-Leninism; Anti-revisionism	Unknown	
Socialist Alternative (SAlt; SA)	1986	Far-left	Communism; Trotskyism	Unknown	
Workers World Party (WWP)	1959	Far-left	Communism; Marxism–Leninism	Unknown	
Freedom Socialist Party (FSP)	1966	Far-left	Communism; Trotskyism; Socialist feminism	Unknown	
American Freedom Party (AFP)	2009	Far-right	Paleoconservatism; White nationalism; Anti-immigration	Unknown	
Socialist Action (SAct)	1983	Far-left	Communism; Trotskyism	Unknown	
Transhumanist Party	2014		Libertarian transhumanism; Extropianism; Technogaianism	Unknown	
Christian Liberty Party (CLP)	2000	Right-wing	Christian right; Christian nationalism; Ultraconservatism	Unknown	

===== Single-state =====
Party	Year founded	Political position	Ideology	Registered voters (2025)	Presidential vote (2024)	Year lost access	Seeking access	State
Alaskan Party	2026		Alaskan nationalism Libertarian conservatism	Did not exist	Did not exist			Alaska
Aloha ʻĀina Party	2015		Aloha ʻĀina; Hawaii Native interests Hawaiian sovereignty	Unknown	No candidate	2023	As of 2025	Hawaii
Common Sense Party of California	2019	Center	Reformism	15,010		Never had		California
Green Party of Alaska (GPAK)	1990	Left-wing	Green politics	1,522	No ballot access		As of May 2022	Alaska
California National Party	2015	Center-left	Californian nationalism Progressivism (US); Environmentalism	Unknown				California
California Freedom Coalition	2017	Big tent	Californian independence Devolution; Regionalism; Self-determination		Unknown			California
Liberal Party of New York	1944	Center-left	Social liberalism	Unknown		2002		New York
Moderate Party of Rhode Island	2007	Center	Fiscal conservatism	Unknown		2018		Rhode Island
Green Party of Rhode Island (GPRI)	1992	Left-wing	Green politics Progressivism (US); Social democracy	Unknown				Rhode Island
Independent Greens of Virginia	2005	Center-right	Green conservatism Fiscal conservatism	Unknown				Virginia
Washington Progressive Party (WAPP)	2002	Left-wing	Progressivism; Democratic socialism Left-wing populism	Unknown				Washington
Progressive Dane	1992	Center-left to Left-wing	Progressivism	Unknown				Wisconsin
Moderate Party	2022	Center	Fiscal conservatism Anti-establishment; Electoral fusion	Unknown		Never had	As of June 2022	New Jersey
New York State Right to Life Party	1970	Single-issue	Anti-abortion	40,278		1978	2002	New York
Libertarian Party of New Hampshire	1974	Far-right	Libertarianism; Paleolibertarianism	Unknown				New Hampshire
Lincoln Party	2026	Big tent	Anti-corruption	Did not exist	Did not exist			Indiana

== Historical parties ==
=== Held national office or elected to Congress ===
Party	Created	Disbanded	Years in national office	Ideology	Other names	Mergers/Splits
Patriots	1768	1787	1775–1787	Republicanism	Revolutionaries; Continentals; Rebels; Whigs	Split into: Federalists and Anti-Federalists
Loyalists	1768	1787	1768–1783	Monarchism	Tories; Royalists; King's Men	Split into: Federalists (remained) and United Empire Loyalists (expelled)
Republican party	1776	1791	1776–1791	Federalism; Conservatism	Republicans	Merged into: Federalist Party
Constitutionalist party	1776	1792	1776–1792	Anti-Federalism; Radicalism	Constitutionalists	Merged into: Democratic-Republican Party
Country party	1781	1811	1789–1807; 1809–1811	Rhode Islander regionalism; Agrarianism; Fiat money	Majority	Merged into: Union party in 1807
Mercantile party	1781	1810	1789–1807; 1809–1810	Mercantilism	Mercantile Interest	Merged into: Union party in 1807
Federalists	1787	1789	1787–1789	Classical conservatism		Merged into: Pro-Administration party
Anti-Federalists	1787	1789	1787–1789	Confederalism; Classical liberalism; Classical republicanism	Federalists	Merged into: Anti-Administration party
Troup party	1788	1832	1789–1832		Jackson party (1788–1806), Crawford party (1806–1824)	Split into: Nullifer Troup party and Union Troup party
Pro-Administration party	1789	1791	1789–1791	Federalism	Administration	Merged into: Federalist Party
Anti-Administration party	1789	1792	1789–1792	Anti-Federalism	Opposition	Merged into: Democratic-Republican Party
Chesapeake party	1790	1790	1790	Oligarchy		Merged into: Pro-Administration party and Anti-Administration party
Potomac party	1790	1790	1790	Populism		Merged into: Pro-Administration party and Anti-Administration party
Federalist Party	1791	1825	1791–1825	Classical conservatism		
Democratic-Republican Party	1792	1825	1792–1825	Jeffersonianism	Republican Party, Democratic Party	Split into: Democratic Party and National Republican Party
Clark party	1801	1832	1819–1827	Anti-Troup		Split into: Union Clark party and Nullifer Clark party
Union party	1807	1809	1807–1809	Pro-Fenner		Split into: Country party and Mercantile party
National Republican Party	1825	1837	1825–1837	Classical conservatism	Anti-Jacksonian Party, Adams-Clay Republicans	Merged into: Whig Party
Anti-Masonic Party	1828	1838	1829–1839	Anti-Masonry		Merged into: Whig Party
Nullifier Party	1828	1839	1831–1839	Nullification		
Whig Party	1833	1854	1837–1857			
Law and Order Party of Rhode Island	1840	1848	1843–1845	Anti-Dorr Rebellion	Charterites	Merged into: Whig Party
Liberty Party	1840	1848	1845–1849	Abolitionism		Merged into: Free Soil Party and Republican Party
Know Nothing	1844	1860	1845–1860	Nativism		Merged into: Constitutional Union Party (South) and Republican Party (North)
Free Soil Party	1848	1855	1849–1857	Abolitionism		Merged into: Republican Party
Union Party	1850	1853	1851–1853	Conditional unionism		
Opposition Party (Northern)	1854	1858	1855–1857	Abolitionism		Merged into: Republican Party
Opposition Party (Southern)	1858	1860	1859–1860	Pro-slavery		Merged into: Constitutional Union Party
Constitutional Union Party	1860	1860	1860	Southern unionism	Unionist Party	Merged into: Unconditional Union Party
National Union Party	1862	1865	1862-1865	American unionism	Union Party	Merged into: Republican Party
Unconditional Union Party	1861	1866	1860–1866	American unionism	Union Party	Merged into: National Union Party
Liberal Republican Party	1871	1875	1871–1875	Classical liberalism		Merged into: Republican Party and Democratic Party
Anti-Monopoly Party	1874	1886	1873–1881	Progressivism		Merged into: People's Party (1892)
Greenback Party	1874	1884	1879–1889	Currency reform		Merged into: People's Party (1892)
Readjuster Party	1870	1885	1881–1889	Left-wing populism		
Labor Party (19th century)			1887–1891			
Populist Party	1892	1908	1892–1903	Populism	Populist Party	Merged into: Democratic Party
Silver Party	1892	1902	1893–1902	Bimetalism		Merged into: Democratic Party
Silver Republican Party	1896	1900	1897–1900	Bimetalism		Merged into: Republican Party
Socialist Party of America (SPA)	1901	1972	1911–1913; 1915–1919; 1921–1929	Democratic socialism		Splinter parties: Nonpartisan League (1915); National Party (1917); Communist Party USA (1919); Proletarian Party of America (1920); American Labor Party (1936); Social Democratic Federation (1936); Final split: (1972–1973) SPUSA, SDUSA, and DSOC
Progressive Party (1912)	1912	1920	1913–1919	Progressivism	Bull Moose Party	Merged into: Republican Party
Farmer–Labor Party	1920	1936	1919–1921; 1923–1945	Social democracy		Merged into: Democratic Party
Wisconsin Progressive Party	1934	1946	1935–1946	Wisconsin Idea		Merged into: Republican Party
National Progressives of America (NPA)	1938	1946	1938–1946	Progressivism; Non-interventionism		Merged into: Republican Party
American Labor Party (ALP)	1936	1956	1939–1951	Social democracy		
Nonpartisan League (NPL)	1915	1956	1917–1959	Democratic socialism Agrarianism	NPL	Merged into: North Dakota Democratic-NPL Party

=== Multi-state political parties ===
Party	Created	Disbanded	Ideology	Other names	Mergers/Splits
American Republican Party (1843)	1843	1845	Nativism		Merged into: American Party (1844)
Democratic-Republican Party (1844)	1844	1844	Texas annexation		Merged into: Democratic Party
Southern Rights Party	1850	1854			Split into: Democratic Party and Whig Party; Merged into: Democratic Party
Radical Democratic Party	1864	1864	Abolitionism		Merged into: Republican Party
Socialist Labor Party of America (SLP)	1876	2011	De Leonism	Workingmen's Party of the United States	
National Democratic Party	1896	1900	Gold standard	Gold Democrats	Split into: Democratic Party; Merged into: Democratic Party
Social Democracy of America (SDA)	1897	1900	Utopian socialism		Merged into: Social Democratic Party
United Christian Party (UCP)	1897	1928	Theocracy; Christian conservatism; Direct democracy		
Social Democratic Party (SDP)	1898	1901	Democratic socialism		Merged into: Socialist Party of America
Independence Party	1906	1914	Progressivism	Independence League	
Single Tax Party	1910	1920s	Georgism	Land Value Tax Party, Commonwealth Land Party	
National Woman's Party (NWP)	1913	1930	Feminism		
National Party	1917	1919	Social democracy Progressivism; Pro-war patriotism		Splits from: Socialist Party of America
Labor Party of the United States	1919	1920	Social democracy		Merged into: Farmer–Labor Party
Proletarian Party of America (PPA)	1920	1971	Communism		Splits from: Socialist Party of America
Workers Party of America (WPA)	1921	1929	Marxism–Leninism	Communist Party USA	
American Party (1924)	1924	1924	Nativism		
Progressive Party (1924)	1924	1924	Progressivism		Merged into: Wisconsin Progressive Party
Communist League of America	1928	1934	Trotskyism		Split from: Communist Party USA
American Labor Party (1932) (ALP)	1932	1935	De Leonism		Split from: Industrial Union Party
Industrial Union Party (IUP)	1933	1950	De Leonism		Split from: Socialist Labor Party of America
American Workers Party (AWP)	1933	1934	Trotskyism		Merged into: Workers Party of the United States
Workers Party of the United States (WPUS)	1934	1938	Trotskyism		Merged into: Socialist Party of America
Union Party	1935	1936	Distributism		
America First Party (1943)	1944	1947	Isolationism		
American Vegetarian Party	1947	1967			
States' Rights Democratic Party	1948	1948	Segregationism	Dixiecrats	Split from: Democratic Party
Progressive Party (1948)	1948	1955	Progressivism		Split from: Democratic Party
Constitution Party (1952)	1952	1970s	Paleoconservatism	Christian Nationalist Party	
National States' Rights Party	1958	1987	Neo-fascism		
American Party (1969)	1969	2008	Paleoconservatism		
Raza Unida Party	1970	2012	Chicanismo		
People's Party (1971)	1971	1976	Democratic socialism		
U.S. Labor Party (USLP)	1975	1979	LaRouchism		
Citizens Party	1979	1984	Progressivism		
New Alliance Party (NAP)	1979	1992	Left-wing populism		
Populist Party (1984)	1984	1996	White nationalism		
Grassroots Party	1986	2012	Marijuana legalization		
Greens/Green Party USA (G/GPUSA)	1991	2019	Ecopolitics	Green Committees of Correspondence	
Labor Party (LP)	1996	2007	Social democracy		
Southern Party (SP)	1999	2003	Southern nationalism		
Boston Tea Party (BTP)	2006	2012	Libertarianism		
Independence Party of America	2007	2013	Centrism		
U.S. Marijuana Party	2002	2016?	Cannabis legalisation; Civil libertarianism		
Rent Is Too Damn High Party	2005	2015	Populism; Social welfare; Anti-tax		
Justice Party	2011	2024	Progressivism		
Serve America Movement (SAM)	2017	2022	Big tent		Merged into: Forward Party

=== Single-state political parties ===
Party	Created	Disbanded	Ideology	Other names	Mergers/Splits	State
Toleration Party	1816	1828	Secularism	American Party	Merged into: Democratic Party	Connecticut
Working Men's Party	1829	1831	Owenism		Merged into: Locofoco faction of the Democratic Party	New York
Anti-Mormon Party	1841	1844				Illinois
Independent Anti-Mormon Party of Oneida County	1870s	1880s				Idaho
People's Party	1870	1891	Mormonism			Utah
Liberal Party	1870	1893	Anti-clericalism			Utah
Independent Reform Party	1874	1874				Illinois
Independent Party	1884	1884				Florida
Home Rule Party of Hawaii	1900	1912	Hawaiian nationalism		Merged into: Republican Party	Hawaii
American Party (1904)	1904	1911				Utah
American Party (1914)	1914	1916			Split from: Democratic Party	New York
Minnesota Farmer–Labor Party (FLP)	1918	1944	Populism		Merged into: Minnesota Democratic–Farmer–Labor Party	Minnesota
Progressive Democratic Party	1944	1948	Progressivism		Split from: Democratic Party	South Carolina
Mississippi Freedom Democratic Party (MFDP)	1964	1964	Desegregation		Merged into: Democratic Party	Mississippi
Lowndes County Freedom Organization (LCFO)	1965	1970	Racial equality	Lowndes County Freedom Party	Merged into: Democratic Party	Alabama
Third Party for America	1966	1968				Alabama
Choctaw Youth Movement (CYM)	1969	1975	Choctaw nationalism			Oklahoma
Libertarian Party of Virginia (LPVA)	1974	2022	Libertarianism			Virginia
Alaskan Independence Party (AIP)	1978	2025	Alaskan nationalism		Merged into: Alaskan Party	Alaska
Labor–Farm Party of Wisconsin	1982	1987	Left-wing populism			Wisconsin
Illinois Solidarity Party	1986	2007	Anti-LaRouchism		Split from: Democratic Party	Illinois
Republican Moderate Party of Alaska	1986	2011	Centrism			Alaska
A Connecticut Party	1990	1998	Liberalism		Split from: Republican Party	Connecticut
Independence Party of New York	1991	2022	Centrism			New York
New Jersey Conservative Party (CP-NJ)	1992	2009	Conservatism			New Jersey
Independent Grassroots Party	1996	1998	Marijuana legalization		Split from: Grassroots Party	Minnesota
Marijuana Reform Party	1998	2002	Marijuana legalization			New York
Independence Party of Florida	1999	2017				Florida
Washington Progressive Party (WAPP)	2002	2023	Progressivism			Washington
Personal Choice Party (PCP)	2004	2006	Libertarianism			Utah
Florida Whig Party	2006	2012	Fiscal Conservatism			Florida
Connecticut for Lieberman	2006	2013	Centrism		Split from: Democratic Party	Connecticut
Tea Party of Nevada	2010	2010	Tea Party movement		Split from: Republican Party	Nevada
Taxpayers Party of New York	2010	2011	Conservatism			New York
Freedom Party of New York	2010	2013	Progressivism			New York
Grassroots–Legalize Cannabis Party	2014	2022	Marijuana legalization			Minnesota
United Independent Party (UIP)	2014	2017	Liberalism			Massachusetts
Women's Equality Party	2014	2018	Feminism			New York
Independent Party of Louisiana	2016	2025	Centrism			Louisiana
Bread and Roses Party	2018	2021	Socialism			Maryland

=== Political parties in the unincorporated territories ===
Party	Created	Disbanded	Ideology	Other names	Mergers/Splits	Territory
Covenant Party	2001	2013	Populism		Merged into: Republican Party	Northern Mariana Islands
Popular Party (Guam)	1949	1964		Commercial Party	Merged into: Democratic Party	Guam
Territorial Party (Guam)	1956	1966			Merged into: Republican Party	Guam
Popular Party (Northern Mariana Islands)		1978			Merged into: Democratic Party	Northern Mariana Islands
Territorial Party (Northern Mariana Islands)					Merged into: Republican Party	Northern Mariana Islands

== Non-electoral organizations ==
=== Active ===
These organizations generally do not nominate candidates for election, but some of them have in the past; they otherwise function similarly to political parties.

Party	Year founded	Former names	Ideology	Mergers/Splits	International affiliations
African People's Socialist Party (APSP)	1972			Merger of: Junta of Militant Organizations; Black Rights Fighters; Black Study Group	Uhuru Movement
American Indian Movement (AIM)	1968		Pan-Indianism		
Black Riders Liberation Party (BRLP)	1996				
Charter Committee	1924				
Citizens Party of the United States	2004				
Committees of Correspondence for Democracy and Socialism (CCDS)	1991				
Clan na Gael (CnG)	1867		Irish republicanism Irish nationalism Irish-American Interests	Successor to the Fenian Brotherhood	IRB (until 1924); Irish Volunteers (until 1918); IRA (until 1969); Provisional IRA (until 2005)
Democratic Socialists of America (DSA)	1982		Democratic Socialism Socialism	Merger of: Democratic Socialist Organizing Committee New American Movement	Socialist International (until 2017) Progressive International
Freedom Road Socialist Organization (FRSO)	1985				ICS
Irish Republican Socialist Committees of North America (IRSCNA)	1984		Marxism–Leninism; Irish republicanism Left-wing nationalism		IRSP
National Justice Party (NJP)	2020		White nationalism		
National Labor Federation (Note: Alleged front for the "Provisional Communist Party") (NATLFED)	1972		Communism		
National Socialist Movement	1974		Neo-Nazism; White supremacy		WUNS
New Afrikan Black Panther Party (NABPP)	2005				
New Black Panther Party (NBPP)	1989				
New Order	1983	American Nazi Party, National Socialist White People's Party	Esoteric Neo-Nazism		World Union of National Socialists
News and Letters Committees	1955				
Patriot Front	2017		Neo-fascism; American nationalism		
Revolutionary Black Panther Party (RBPP)	1992				
Revolutionary Communists of America (RCA)	1998 (Note: Adopted present name in 2024)	Youth for International Socialism; Workers' International League	Communism; Trotskyism		RCI
Revolutionary Communist Party, USA (RCPUSA)	1975	Revolutionary Union	Marxism–Leninism–Maoism; Bob Avakian's New Synthesis		RIM (1986–2006)
Social Democrats, USA (SDUSA)	1972		Social democracy Democratic socialism Anti-communism	Successor to: Socialist Party of America	Socialist International (1973–2005)
Spartacist League/U.S.	1966		Communism; Trotskyism		ICL(FI)
World Socialist Party of the United States (WSPUS)	1916	Socialist Party of the United States; Socialist Educational Society; Workers' Socialist Party	Revolutionary socialism Classical Marxism; Impossibilism	Split from: Socialist Party of America	WSM

=== Historical ===
These historical organizations did not officially nominate candidates for election but may have endorsed or supported campaigns; they otherwise functioned similarly to political parties.

Party	Created	Disbanded	Ideology	Other names	Mergers/Splits
National Renaissance Party (NRP)	1949	1981	Neo-Nazism		
American Nazi Party (ANP)	1959	1983	Neo-Nazism	World Union of Free Enterprise National Socialists, National Socialist White People's Party, New Order (successor organization)	Split into: National Socialist Party of America, National Alliance, National Socialist Movement, and New Order.
Patriot Party	1960	1980	Socialism		Split from: Young Patriots Organization
Black Panther Party	1966	1982	Black nationalism		
Black Hammer Party	2019	2025	Black separatism Black conservatism Pan-Africanism; Sakaism		
Youth International Party (YIP)	1967	1967	Anarcho-socialism	Yippies	
Marxist–Leninist Party, USA (MLPUSA)	1967	1993	Marxism–Leninism		
Red Guard Party	1969	1973	Maoism		
Communist Workers Party (CWP)	1969	1985	Maoism		
National Socialist Party of America (NSPA)	1970	1981	Neo-Nazism		Split from: American Nazi Party
National Amerindianist American Redman's Party (NAARP)	1972	1976	Third Worldism, Socialism		
National Alliance	1974	2013	Neo-Nazism		Split from: American Nazi Party
New Union Party	1974	2005	De Leonism		
International Socialist Organization (ISO)	1977	2019	Trotskyism		
White Patriot Party (WPP)	1980	1987	White supremacy	Carolina Knights of the Ku Klux Klan, Confederate Knights of the Ku Klux Klan	
New Party	1992	1998	Progressivism		Merged into: Working Families Party
Traditionalist Worker Party (TWP)	2013	2018	Neo-Nazism		

== Party registration ==
Officially recognized parties in states are not guaranteed to have ballot access, membership numbers of some parties with ballot access are not tracked, and vice versa. Not all of these parties or voters are active. Only 31 states and the District of Columbia have voters register by party; in the others, voter registration does not include a party reference. Boxes in gray mean that the specific party's registration is not reported.

Political party registration by state
State/DC	As of	DEM	REP	LIB	GRN	CST	WFP	Others	Unaffiliated	Total
Alaska	Sep 3, 2026	69,894	142,184	6,067	–	767	–	5,696 (Note: "Other" political affiliations listed as follows: Green Party of Alaska – 1,458; Reform Alaska Permanent Fund Dividend Party – 36; Prohibition Party – 2; Conservative Party USA – 85; Alaska Neighbors Party – 19; Alaskan Party – 44; Veterans Party of Alaska – 1,462; UCES' Clowns Party – 258; The Future Generation Party – 5; American Party of Alaska – 5)	381,024 (Note: Nonpartisan – 82,002; Undeclared – 299,022)	605,632
Arizona	Jul 21, 2026	1,210,510	1,523,886	30,415	5,312	–		1,536,431 (Note: "Other" political affiliations listed as follows: Arizona Independent Party – 46,246; Other – 1,490,185)	–	4,306,554
Arkansas	Jul 17, 2026	84,043	153,227	744	124	–		4 (Note: "Other" political affiliations listed as follows: Nonpartisan Judicial – 3; Other – 1)	1,592,912	1,831,054
California	May 18, 2026	10,397,692	5,779,786	231,107	113,790	216	–	1,694,127 (Note: "Other" political affiliations listed as follows: American Independent Party – 965,068; Peace and Freedom Party – 154,305; Common Sense Party – 13,410; American Solidarity Party – 729; Peace Party – 80; Unknown – 88,047; Forward Party – 1,126)	5,284,968	23,155,447
Colorado	Jan 1, 2026	997,725	906,396	34,926	8,119	11,165	–	40,589 (Note: "Other" political affiliations listed as follows: No Labels – 28,693; Approval Voting – 4,871; Colorado Center – 3,675; Unity – 2,943; Forward Party – 407)	1,997,007	3,995,927
Connecticut	Oct 19, 2026	881,528	522,904	–				37,238 (Note: "Other" political affiliations listed as follows: Libertarian Party of Connecticut; Green Party of Connecticut; Independent Party of Connecticut; Connecticut Working Families Party)	1,048,280	2,489,950
Delaware	Dec 1, 2025	333,659	201,648	1,848	782	222	313	18,256 (Note: "Other" political affiliations listed as follows: Independent Party of Delaware – 12,398; No Labels – 1,445; Conservative Party of Delaware – 881; Liberal Party of Delaware – 787; American – 576; American Delta – 350; We the People – 198; Socialist Workers – 136; Mandalorians – 124; Blue Enigma – 74; Natural Law – 75; Other – 1,165; Reform Party – 47)	243,064	801,001
District of Columbia	Aug 31, 2026	343,264	22,240	–	4,113	–		2,514	77,286	449,417
Florida	Aug 31, 2026	4,098,139	5,649,410	–				505,914	3,326,661	13,580,124
Idaho	Sep 1, 2026	122,021	646,820	–					246,923	1,030,522
Iowa	Jul 2, 2026	527,675	711,587	–					555,309	1,794,571
Kansas	Nov 6, 2025	495,691	897,243	23,772	–			6,901 (Note: "Other" political affiliations listed as follows: No Labels Kansas – 5,955; United Kansas – 946)	575,983	1,999,608
Kentucky	Aug 1, 2026	1,371,014	1,624,505	15,920	2,618	1,646	–	185,885 (Note: "Other" political affiliations listed as follows: Other – 184,590; Socialist Workers – 742; Kentucky Party – 305; Reform Party – 248)	180,313	3,491,005
Louisiana	Sep 1, 2026	1,059,085	1,066,642	15,839	2,583	154	–	25,339 (Note: "Other" political affiliations listed as follows: Reform Party – 823; Other – 24,516)	823,028	2,973,271
Maine	Mar 7, 2026	305,364	273,632	5,680	30,687	–			282,314	897,677
Maryland	Aug 2026	2,222,557	1,014,245	–	6,227	–		74,240 (Note: "Other" political affiliations listed as follows: Working Class Party – 5,207; Other – 69,033)	909,180	4,322,671
Massachusetts	Feb 2, 2025	1,298,603	423,387	–				49,401	3,254,435	5,025,826
Nebraska	Sep 1, 2026	327,935	619,984	17,475	–			10,802 (Note: "Other" political affiliations listed as follows: Legal Marijuana Now Party – 10,680; Nebraska Working People – 18; America First – 104)	282,473	1,258,669
Nevada	Sep 1, 2026	675,096	659,956	18,042	–			142,964 (Note: "Other" political affiliations listed as follows: Independent American Party – 102,692; Other – 40,272)	997,438	2,493,496
New Hampshire	Aug 3, 2026	247,069	299,976	–					351,815	898,860
New Jersey	Sep 1, 2026	2,569,509	1,686,473	24,228	11,311	11,281	–	27,271 (Note: "Other" political affiliations listed as follows: Conservative Party – 13,116; Socialist Party – 7,577; Natural Law Party – 5,240; Reform Party – 1,338)	2,379,398	6,709,471
New Mexico	Aug 31, 2026	575,726	444,654	–				27,205	403,396	1,450,981
New York	Feb 20, 2026	6,445,605	2,994,839	–			63,467	493,859 (Note: "Other" political affiliations listed as follows: Conservative Party – 169,313; Others – 324,546)	3,410,288	13,408,058
North Carolina	Mar 3, 2026	292,659	341,638	5,879	640	–			407,759	1,048,575
Oklahoma	Aug 3, 2026	616,132	1,294,390	23,783	–				500,475	2,434,780
Oregon	Sep 11, 2026	1,002,494	740,084	18,753	7,836	0	8,633	32,489 (Note: "Other" political affiliations listed as follows: No Labels – 10,373; Oregon Progressive Party – 4,781; Other – 17,335)	1,145,741	3,112,307
Pennsylvania	Sep 14, 2026	3,850,632	3,634,026	–					1,508,675	8,993,333
Rhode Island	Sep 1, 2026	235,187	100,348	–					359,486	695,021
South Dakota	Sep 1, 2026	134,453	330,399	2,788	–			1,003	156,019	624,662
Utah	Sep 14, 2026	249,132	913,163	18,380	1,195	6,706	–	96,915 (Note: "Other" political affiliations listed as follows: Independent American Party – 94,720; Forward Party – 2,195)	509,924	1,777,146
West Virginia	Aug 31, 2026	326,023	525,194	10,828	2,788	239	–	34,732	305,730	1,205,534
Wyoming	Sep 1, 2026	30,690	217,895	1,758	–	552	–	2,259	25,314	278,468

=== Parties by total number of registered voters ===
The following parties had more than 50,000 registered voters: (Note: Parties with "Independent" in the name are excluded as separate entries, as voters often confuse these with registering as a nonpartisan. Nevada's Independent American Party is included in the Constitution Party total as its state affiliate.)

Party	Voters	%	Rank
Democratic Party	44,417,573	34.96%	1
Independent	41,198,951	32.42%	
Republican Party	37,877,051	29.80%	2
Other	2,103,151	1.66%	
Libertarian Party	695,779	0.55%	3
Green Party	255,119	0.20%	4
Conservative Party of New York	169,313	0.13%	5
Peace and Freedom Party	154,305	0.12%	6
Constitution Party	145,511	0.11%	7
Working Families Party	69,363	0.05%	8

== See also ==
- Political parties in the United States
- Party system
- Political party strength in U.S. states
- Two-party system
- State and territorial parties:
  - List of political parties in Puerto Rico
  - List of state parties of the Democratic Party (United States)
  - List of state parties of the Republican Party (United States)
  - List of state Green Parties in the United States
  - List of state parties of the Libertarian Party (United States)
- Other political party lists:
  - List of frivolous political parties
  - List of ruling political parties by country
