= Black Hammer Party =

- Leader: Augustus Cornelius Romain Jr. (a.k.a. Gazi Kodzo)
- Founded: 2019
- Dissolved: 2025 (Note: In January 2025, the party's leader Gazi Kodzo was reported to be "out of the activist business" and the party was described as "in shambles", with its website put on sale and social media inactive for over a year. Gazi Kodzo was also described to be the "former leader" of the party in January 2025, with no known new leader or notable members of the party. In December 2024, Gazi Kodzo was still referred to as the party's leader in present tense.)
- Split from: African People's Socialist Party
- Headquarters: Atlanta, Georgia
- Ideology: Pan-Africanism; Black separatism; Black nationalism; Communism; Socialism; Russophilia; Anti-Zionism
- Political position: Far-left
- Colors: Venetian red Black

The Black Hammer Party, formerly the Black Hammer Organization and commonly known as the Black Hammers, was an American black nationalist group that advocated black separatism, socialism, decolonization, and political violence. The organization was founded in Atlanta, Georgia in 2019, by ex-members of the African People's Socialist Party, and rose to prominence in the early 2020s amidst the George Floyd protests and the 2020–2023 United States racial unrest, when it attempted to construct a compound in the Rocky Mountains which it named "Hammer City."

The Atlanta Journal-Constitution described the organization as "a disruptive force on Atlanta’s radical left," mixing "communism and Black nationalism," "pairing far-left revolutionary rhetoric with combative populism," and mixing "Black nationalist rhetoric and a revolutionary message with hot-button issues like anti-vaccine myths and election conspiracies." The group reportedly recruited members from homeless populations in the United States. Seen as a "radical leftist socialist group," it called for an 'anti-capitalist revolution', independent Black state that would comprise a part of the territory of the United States, and reparations from 'white colonizers'.

By 2025, the domain blackhammer.org had been put on sale. In January 2025, The Atlanta Journal-Constitution reported that the organization's leader, known as Gazi Kodzo, was "out of the activist business" after the criminal charges against them were dropped, and that the group was "in shambles" as their social media pages "have been dormant for the past year or longer." In December 2024, Gazi Kodzo was still referred to as the party's leader in present tense, but by late January 2025, they were described as the former leader instead. Given Kodzo's hegemonic position in the party, its complete inactivity, and no known new leader or notable members, the party is presumed to have been dissolved.

== History ==
=== Early history ===
Prior to creation of the group, its leading members were members of the African People's Socialist Party (APSP). Gazi Kodzo (born Augustus Cornelius Romain Jr.), who would later become the leader of the Black Hammer Party, served as the Secretary General of APSP. The APSP was accused of being "a cult," and the leader of APSP, Omali Yeshitela, allegedly traveled to Russia in May 2015 to attend a conference hosted by Aleksandr Viktorovich Ionov, where Yeshitela was said to have been recruited into an influence operation led by Ionov. Around November 2018, Kodzo left the African People's Socialist Party, and founded the Black Hammer Party a few months after.

The group was founded as the Black Hammer Organization in 2019 in Atlanta by "a handful of activists with backgrounds in radical Black communist organizing." By 2020, membership increased significantly following the murder of George Floyd and the ensuing protests across the United States, with the organization amassing "hundreds" of members and chapters across the country. In the same year, the Black Hammer Party also established a chapter in Colorado and became "a visible part of Denver’s leftist activist scene."

Kodzo eventually rose as the organization's leader, which according to a founding member who defected, caused the group to go "from a vehicle of liberation to one of abuse and toxicity." Other former members have accused Kodzo of "overworking members in sweatshop conditions" and "[manipulating] members into breaking up with life partners and spouses." Later allegations stated that Kodzo had infiltrated the Black Hammer Party and engaged in forced labor against party members.

Kodzo was known for their inflammatory social media presence. On January 24, 2021, they released a video wearing Joker makeup and calling Holocaust victim Anne Frank a "bleach demon," a "colonizer," a "parasite," and a "Karen," and claiming that they were going to burn copies of her diary for warmth.

According to The Forward, the group's membership began to decline around early August 2021 due to "Kevin Rashid Johnson of the New Afrikan Black Panther Party [accusing] the organization of being an undercover right-wing group trying to sow division within leftist movements."

The organization under Kodzo's leadership has also opposed vaccination for COVID-19, and on September 15, 2021, led a protest outside the Atlanta headquarters of the Centers for Disease Control and Prevention in support of rapper Nicki Minaj, who at the time claimed to not have been vaccinated. In December of the same year, Kodzo also claimed to have formed an alliance with far-right organization Proud Boys, and hosted a podcast alongside Proud Boys founder Gavin McInnes, claiming to be forming a "coalition to defeat the disgusting pedo-loving, welfare economy demoncrats [sic] and their puppet master, Big Pharma." Both organizations shared the belief that the 2020 US presidential election had been "stolen" from President Donald Trump.

In 2021, Kodzo began to distance himself from Black Lives Matter. They stated that this was "because of my stance on pedophilia and the fact that I started reading the Bible more." The group has since supported the Supreme Court overturning Roe v. Wade, and the 2022 Russian invasion of Ukraine. It organized its own church, and would livestream its church meetings at Woodruff Park in Atlanta, where the members of the Black Hammer Party would hand out food, clothing and melee weapons to homeless people who expressed support. The group named it the “Revolutionary Church”, with Kodzo becoming the "revivalist preacher."

=== Attempts to establish Hammer City ===
On May 3, 2021, the group announced that they had "liberated" 200 acres of land somewhere in Colorado, – later revealed to be Beaver Pines, San Miguel County – after raising over US$60,000 in donations (eventually reaching US$112,000). Named the "Hammer City," they claimed through Facebook that the soil was "rich" and that "colonized people need their own land, their own space, their own modes of production [...]." The group promoted Hammer City as a place where "there will be no rent, no cops, no coronavirus, and no white people." It was referred to as a "no-whites zone."

On May 14, the group missed a deadline to sign the documents for acquiring the land. On May 17, following reports of group members still squatting on the land while carrying firearms and wearing military gear, and after a brief armed standoff with a local man, the group was escorted out of the property by deputies of the San Miguel County police in the evening. The San Miguel County Sheriff later inspected the property, finding an unfinished footbridge over a drainage ditch, a real estate sign riddled with bullet holes, and 4-inch screws scattered on the road. By summer 2021, the Black Hammer Party had relocated to Atlanta, Georgia.

=== Fayetteville police raid ===
On July 19, 2022, police in Fayetteville, Georgia received an anonymous call from someone claiming to be held against their will in a home rented by the Black Hammer Party. A SWAT team was sent to search the home, where there were ten people inside. Nine walked out willingly. An 18-year-old man identified as Amonte T. Ammons was killed by an apparent self-inflicted gunshot to the head. Black Hammer Party claimed that Ammons was murdered by SWAT responders. The duration of the standoff was several hours, and the surrounding neighborhood received a shelter-in-place order.

Gazi Kodzo was arrested and charged with aggravated sodomy, conspiracy, false imprisonment, kidnapping, aggravated assault, and street gang activity. Another man, an associate of Kodzo named Xavier H. Rushin, was arrested and charged with kidnapping, assault, false imprisonment, and street gang activity. Rushin took a plea bargain which includes both a sentence of 20 years in the Georgia state prison system with the possibility of parole on July 2025 and to give witness testimony during the state of Georgia's case against Kodzo. The group was under joint investigation by the FBI and local authorities. According to a local street gang investigator, the group had been under surveillance by police for months prior to the incident.

=== Kodzo's release and aftermath ===
On January 29, 2025, the District Attorney's Office of Fayette County, Georgia decided to drop all charges against Kodzo. Chief assistant prosecutor David Studdard explained that "the expected testimony by [Rushin] and other key witnesses was unreliable and the case had languished too long." Furthermore, according to Studdard, Kodzo's lawyers claimed that Kodzo was thereby "out of the activist business." The Atlanta Journal-Constitution wrote that "the Kodzo is free but his Black Hammer Party is in shambles," as "the group’s many social media channels have been dormant for the past year or longer, the last posts switching between posting pro-Russian propaganda and raising money for Kodzo’s criminal defense."

By January 2025, only one Black Hammer member was in prison, Xavier "Keno" Rushin, who was arrested in the Fayetteville police raid and was serving a sentence in Georgia's Central State Prison for aggravated assault through a plea deal with prosecutors. Rushin was expected to testify against Kodzo, but ultimately the prosecutors decided against summoning him. He was released later in 2025. In December 2024, Gazi Kodzo was still referred to as the party's leader in present tense, but by late January 2025, they were described as the former leader instead. Given Kodzo's hegemonic position in the party, its complete inactivity, and no known new leader or notable members, the party is presumed to have been dissolved.

== Ideology ==
The Black Hammer Party called for a black and Native American-led revolution and a separate homeland, as well as reparations from white "colonizers." The party's stated goal was to patriate land to colonized people; it promoted Pan-Africanism and argued that it “represents breaking the chains of colonialism and building a self-determined future for all colonized people worldwide.” The Atlanta Journal-Constitution wrote that the party combined a "Black nationalist rhetoric and a revolutionary message with hot-button issues like anti-vaccine myths and election conspiracies," and that it "melded its Marxist message with viral online strategies of modern far-right populists." It noted that "the shift to issues that are hot button topics for the far right appears to be a new and opportunistic ploy to generate attention." The journal also described the group as "a disruptive force on Atlanta’s radical left," mixing "communism and Black nationalism," and "pairing far-left revolutionary rhetoric with combative populism."

It endorsed the Russian invasion of Ukraine and supported Dobbs v. Jackson Women's Health Organization which overruled Roe v. Wade. The party wrote: "We are in support of Russia.," and clarified by stating: “The U.S. has a hold on what is being propagated about the war on — the defensive war — Russia’s defensive war against Ukraine, against world colonial powers because that’s what’s happening right now.” The group protested the U.S. military aid to Ukraine, arguing that the money spent on Ukraine is a direct cause of the rising cost of gasoline and shortage of baby formula. It argued: "Why should we be upset with Russia or side against Russia in this war? We should be upset with how amerikkka (sic!) is treating its own people instead!” In its declaration to the American population, the Black Hammer Party argued: "No one threatens democracy in your country, except those people who infringe on women’s reproductive rights, create unbearable conditions for migrants, and also oppress people on racial grounds!”"

It was described as a "radical leftist socialist group," Black supremacist, and a "black nationalist communist group." The Black Hammer Party claimed to represent the Black and Native American people of the United States, and it advocated an anti-capitalist revolution, a separate homeland and financial reparations from 'white colonizers'. The group was known for its incendiary claims, such as arguing that Anne Frank did not deserve sympathy because had she survived the Holocaust, she would have become a 'European colonizer' and 'oppressor' through participating in the Nakba; the party's members announced their plans to burn copies of Anne Frank’s diary. The Daily Beast accused the group of using anti-white and antisemitic rhetoric.

The party was described as a "far-left extremist group," and a "radical, paramilitary organization" that plans to "take back the land from white people." It considered itself a "symbol of hope for the colonized poor and working class" and argued that because of the COVID-19 pandemic, police brutality and other social issues disproportionaly affect people of color, it was necessary to establish a separate nation for them, as the “Colonized people need their own land, their own space, their own modes of production in order to advance an anti-colonial struggle any higher.” Some members of the party claimed that it "seemed like an ideal leftist activist group for people of color," and praised Romaine's "anti-colonial analysis" and their ability to "get into the weeds on Maoism."

== Alleged Russian influence ==
On July 29, 2022, the U.S. Department of Justice made public information about alleged Russian influence operations involving collaboration with American political organizations. It did not name the groups directly. However, based on the released information, the Black Hammer Party (allegedly "U.S. Political Group 2" in the released document) was among the groups implicated in these activities, according to multiple media reports.

According to these reports, the Black Hammer Party had received funding from Russian citizen Aleksandr Viktorovich Ionov, an individual with connections to the Russian government. This would have been used to fund the group's protest at the headquarters of Meta Platforms, Facebook's parent company, due to the latter's censorship of posts supporting the 2022 Russian invasion of Ukraine.

According to the released information, the implicated groups would have received "direction or control over them on behalf of the FSB," through Ionov.

On September 12, 2024 Kodzo, along with Omali Yeshitela and 2 other African People's Socialist Party members, were found guilty of violating 18 U.S.C. § 951: Conspiracy to Act as an Agent of a Foreign Government. On December 9th, 2024, Kodzo was sentenced to 5 years of probation.
