= Henning A. Blomen =

American politicial activist (1910–1993)

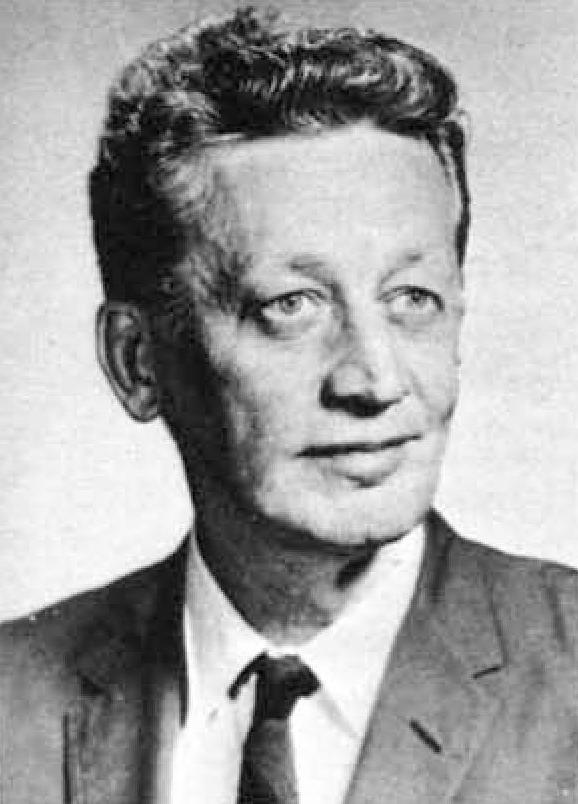
- Blomen in 1968

Personal details
- Born: September 28, 1910 New Bedford, Massachusetts, US
- Died: July 14, 1993 (aged 82) North Reading, Massachusetts US
- Party: Socialist Labor Party of America
- Other political affiliations: Industrial Union Party
- Occupation: Political activist, political candidate

Henning A. Blomen (September 28, 1910 – July 14, 1993) was an American political activist and candidate. He was the Socialist Labor Party of America's nominee for President of the United States in 1968, after running as its nominee for Vice President in 1964.

== Biography ==
Blomen was born in on September 28, 1910, in New Bedford, Massachusetts, the son of Swedish immigrant Gustav A. Blomen and Clara E. (née Magnuson) Blomen. He graduated from Somerville High School. He worked as a shipper and coffee importer, and for more than 25 years was a machine assembler for the Dewey & Almy Chemical Company, a chemical company. On October 16, 1940, he was drafted to serve in World War II.

From 1932 to 1990, Blomen was a member of the Socialist Labor Party of America (SLP). He was also a member of the Industrial Union Party. In 1934, he campaigned for the SLP across Massachusetts. Politicially, he was a De Leonist. He opposed the Vietnam War. He advocated a bloodless revolution, the abolishment of capitalism, and the establishment of a socialist industrial republic.

Blomen was the SLP vice presidential nominee during the 1964 Presidential election, alongside Eric Hass. He was the party's 1968 presidential nominee, with Paul Boutelle as his running mate. Also in 1968, he received one vote for the United States House of Representatives in New Jersey's 2nd congressional district. He was an unsuccessful candidate for Governor of Massachusetts fourteen times, including in 1938, 1940, 1942, 1944, 1956, 1958, 1960, 1962, 1966, and 1970.

On February 19, 1969, he married Connie Zimmerman, who went on to be the SLP vice presidential candidate in 1976. He had three children, sons John and David Elwell, and daughter Francis Tripp. In 1990, he entered a nursing home in North Reading, Massachusetts, dying there on July 14, 1993, aged 82.

Preceded by Eric Hass	Socialist Labor Party presidential candidate 1968	Succeeded by Louis Fisher
