= Socialist Union Party =

United States political party

The Socialist Union Party was a small De Leonist group that was active in the United States in the late 1930s and early 1940s.

The group was founded by Abraham Ziegler, who had been expelled from the Socialist Labor Party in the mid-1930s and joined the Industrial Union Party, the only other De Leonist group. While the IUP once had a small following among independent unions such as the Sailors Union of the Pacific and the United Furniture Workers of America in the early 1930s, by the end of the decade this support had dried up, with those groups joining more traditional labor federations like the American Federation of Labor. With their base in the labor movement gone, the IUP was reduced to a propagandist/ educational society.

Ziegler and a few followers split in 1939. Rejecting orthodox De Leonist dual unionism, the SUP argued that they should try to build up radical insurgencies within the established unions to resist the fast approaching Second World War. The organization published a paper, Labor Power, a pamphlet Daniel De Leon: pioneer American socialist and a few leaflets during its brief existence.

By 1941 Ziegler had come to the conclusion that splinter groups like the SUP were a waste of time and dissolved the organization in favor of launching a personal journal Modern Socialism that would reflect a broader range of dissident Marxist thought. Contributors included Paul Mattick and Fred Dyer. The new journal lasted four issues in late 1941 and early 1942 until it folded after Ziegler was drafted.
