= Kevin Rashid Johnson =

American prisoner and social activist

Control Unit Torture, art by Kevin Rashid Johnson

Kevin "Rashid" Johnson (born October 3, 1971 in Richmond, Virginia) is a revolutionary, writer, artist, social activist, founding member of the New Afrikan Black Panther Party, founding member of the Revolutionary Intercommunal Black Panther Party (which split from the NABPP in December 2020), member of the Incarcerated Workers Organizing Committee, and prisoner in the Ohio Department of Rehabilitation and Correction.

Johnson, a former drug dealer, was convicted of murder in 1990 and sentenced to life in prison. He maintains that he is innocent and was wrongfully convicted.

== Imprisonment ==
According to his official biography, he has spent some 18 years in solitary confinement, during which he studied law and subsequently filed a number of lawsuits against the prison system.

In 2017, Johnson was transferred from the Texas Department of Criminal Justice to the Florida Department of Corrections for allegedly having a weapon in his cell, although he claims he was transferred as the result of "persistently publicizing the abuses of the Texas prison system".

Johnson was charged with inciting a riot on January 10, 2018, after helping to organize a prison strike centered in Florida, and after publishing a related article on the anarchist website It's Going Down. In the piece, entitled Florida Prisoners Are Laying It Down, Johnson detailed what he views as the "objectionable conditions" of prisoners, including unpaid labor, price gouging, and the "gain-time scam that replaced parole". (Note: See also Parole#United States) Although the state of Florida maintains the strike never occurred, prison rights groups released statements claiming that "prisoners in more than a dozen facilities either went on strike or were preemptively punished to prevent them from doing so." (Note: According to an official statement from the Florida Department of Corrections, "There was no punitive action on the work stoppage because it didn't happen—there was no strike.") Johnson's lawyers have alleged he was tortured in retaliation while held in solitary confinement, and was confined in an unheated cell in freezing temperatures.

In August 2021, a statement from the Revolutionary Intercommunal Black Panther Party noted that Johnson had been moved from Indiana to Ohio, where it was alleged that he had been threatened with lynching and prevented from writing or communicating with supporters.

== Writing and political views ==
Johnson is a frequent contributor to the newspaper San Francisco Bay View.

Johnson maintains that prison labor is a form of modern slavery, writing in The Guardian:

At the end of the civil war in 1865 the 13th amendment of the US constitution was introduced. Under its terms, slavery was not abolished, it was merely reformed. Anybody convicted of a crime after 1865 could be leased out by the state to private corporations who would extract their labor for little or no pay. In some ways that created worse conditions than under the days of slavery, as private corporations were under no obligation to care for their forced laborers – they provided no healthcare, nutritious food or clothing to the individuals they were exploiting.

== Revolutionary Intercommunal Black Panther Party ==
In December 2020, Johnson and five others declared they were splitting from the New Afrikan Black Panther Party, alleging that the leadership outside the prison system had "purged all critics" including most non-incarcerated members. Johnson said he would be forming a new "Revolutionary Intercommunal" Black Panther Party which would pursue Huey P. Newton's ideology of Intercommunalism.

== Publications ==
=== Books ===
- Kevin "Rashid" Johnson (November 15, 2015). Panther Vision: Essential Party Writings and Art of Kevin "Rashid" Johnson, Minister of Defense. Kersplebedeb. ISBN 978-1-894946-76-6.
- Kevin Johnson (December 2010). Defying the Tomb: Selected Prison Writings and Art of Kevin "Rashid" Johnson. Kersplebedeb. ISBN 978-1-894946-39-1.

=== Articles ===
- Johnson, Kevin "Rashid" (October 2022). ""FIRST DO NO GOOD": THE HYPOCRITICAL OATH OF PRISON MEDICAL CARE" (PDF). Turning the Tide. 34 (4): 2. Archived from the original (PDF) on December 5, 2022.
- Johnson, Kevin "Rashid" (June 2022). "THE WAR UKRAINE: IT'S ONLY AN "ILLEGAL INVASION" WHEN IT'S DONE TO WHITE PEOPLE". Turning the Tide. 34 (2). ProQuest 2656306909.
- Johnson, Kevin "Rashid" (December 2021). "INVENTING PRETEXTS TO JUSTIFY OFFICIAL CRIMES: PAGES FROM THE PIG PLAYBOOK -- READING NUMBER 2 (2021)" (PDF). Turning the Tide. 33 (4): 2. Archived from the original (PDF) on November 30, 2021.
- Johnson, Kevin "Rashid" (September 2021). "Liberation Penology: Our Strategy of Transforming Prisons into Schools of Liberation" (PDF). Turning the Tide. 33 (3): 2. Archived from the original (PDF) on December 5, 2022.
- Johnson, Kevin "Rashid" (March 2021). "WAS 9/11 AN INSIDE JOB?: (A Reply To Mike Novick Of Turning The Tide Newspaper)" (PDF). Turning the Tide. 33 (1): 7. Archived from the original (PDF) on February 28, 2021.
- Johnson, Kevin "Rashid" (December 2020). "How The Pigs Abuse 'Gang' Labels" (PDF). Turning the Tide. 32 (4): 2. Archived from the original (PDF) on December 5, 2022.
- Johnson, Kevin "Rashid" (September 2020). "Let My People Go! A Call To Release All U.S. Prisoners in Response to COVID-19" (PDF). Turning the Tide. 32 (3): 3. Archived from the original (PDF) on December 5, 2022.
- Johnson, Kevin "Rashid" (September 2019). "Panthers Organize Shutdown of Newark Prison Construction: No Prison Fridays" (PDF). Turning the Tide. 31 (3): 1. Archived from the original (PDF) on December 5, 2022.
- Johnson, Kevin Rashid (August 23, 2018). "Prison labor is modern slavery. I've been sent to solitary for speaking out". The Guardian. Archived from the original on November 24, 2022.
- Johnson, Kevin "Rashid" (2018). "Heroic or Heinous: The Death Penalty Case of Thomas Porter". Turning the Tide. 30 (4). Archived from the original on August 26, 2021.
- Johnson, Kevin "Rashid" (March 2017). "Bound and Gassed: My Reward for Exposing Abuses and Killings of Texas Prisoners". Turning the Tide. 29 (1). ProQuest 1875058864.
- Johnson, Kevin "Rashid" (November 2014). "Racialized Mass Imprisonment: Counterinsurgency and Genocide". Socialism and Democracy. 28 (3): 57–63. doi:10.1080/08854300.2014.954924. S2CID 143875250. Archived from the original on December 5, 2022.
- Johnson, Kevin "Rashid" (March 2014). "Razor Wire Plantations: Amerika's Addiction to Slavery, Cruelty and Genocide" (PDF). Turning the Tide. 27 (1): 5. Archived from the original (PDF) on June 9, 2019.
- Johnson, Kevin “Rashid” (March 2013). "Political Struggle in the Teeth of Prison Reaction: From Virginia to Oregon". Socialism and Democracy. 27 (1): 78–94. doi:10.1080/08854300.2012.760266. S2CID 144478053. Archived from the original on December 5, 2022.
- Johnson, Kevin "Rashid" (March 2007). "Amerikan Prisons Are Government-Sponsored Torture". Socialism and Democracy. 21 (1): 87–96. doi:10.1080/08854300601116761. S2CID 219694097. Archived from the original on December 5, 2022.
- Johnson, Kevin "Rashid" (July 2005). "A practical approach to strategic organizing for popular struggle". Socialism and Democracy. 19 (2): 171–178. doi:10.1080/08854300500122431. S2CID 144494902. Archived from the original on December 5, 2022.

== See also ==
- George Jackson (activist)
- Prison abolition movement
- Prison reform
