= Anti-Mormon Party =

Anti-Mormon Party may refer to:

- Anti-Mormon Party (Idaho), a political party in Idaho in the late-19th century
- Anti-Mormon Party (Illinois), a political party in Hancock County, Illinois from 1841 to 1844
- American Party (Utah), a political party in Utah from 1904 to 1911, often referred to as an "anti-Mormon party"
- Liberal Party (Utah), a political party in Utah from 1870 to 1893, often called the "Anti-Mormon Party"
