= Intercommunalism =

Ideology of internationalist struggle, in the late Black Panther Party

Intercommunalism is an ideology which was adopted by the Oakland chapter of the Black Panther Party after its turn away from revolutionary nationalism in 1970. Intercommunalists believe that most forms of nationalism are obsolescent, because international corporations and technologically advanced imperialist states have reduced most nations down to a series of discrete communities which exist to supply an imperial center, a situation called reactionary intercommunalism. They also believe this situation can be transformed into revolutionary intercommunalism and eventually communism if communities are able to link "liberated zones" together into a united front against imperialism. According to Huey P. Newton the development of intercommunalism was necessary "because nations have been transformed into communities of the world." Intercommunalism is a lesser-known aspect of the Panthers' legacy as much of its development occurred at the height of the party's suppression and reorientation towards survival programs.

== Development ==
At the founding of the Black Panther Party for Self-Defense in 1966, the party's stated ideology was Black nationalism influenced by the work of Malcolm X. According to Newton, the Panthers saw that other peoples had seen material gains through forming nations and therefore "argued that it was rational and logical for them to believe that their sufferings as a people would end when they established a nation of their own, composed of their own people."

However, confrontations with the US state led to the belief that separatist nationalism within the United States would be impossible without an attack on multiple fronts against the US police and military. The party adopted a revolutionary nationalist ideology and sought to join "with all the other people in the world struggling for decolonization and nationhood, and called [themselves] a "dispersed colony" because [they] did not have the geographical concentration that other so-called colonies had."

According to Newton, the basic ideas on Intercommunalism came to him while working on a letter to the Communist Party of Vietnam. He felt that there was a contradiction inherent in supporting the revolutionary nationalism of the Vietnamese people, while also disclaiming the nationalism of other Black Power groups. Newton felt that to call himself an internationalist and critic of American nationalism while supporting Vietnamese nationalism was both contradictory and condescending towards the Vietnamese. While Newton ultimately sent the letter (and harmed the Party's relationship with Black nationalist groups in the process), he was unhappy with it for months, and developed the theory of intercommunalism in response to the problems the letter raised. From this point on Newton argued that both nationalism and internationalism were obsolete due to US hegemony. This shift in perspective was made public in a speech at Boston College on 18 November 1970.

The theory of Intercommunalism also reflected Newton's need to reassert himself within the party after years in prison. It has been suggested that much of the Oakland chapter's shift in direction had to do with a perceived need to distance the party from Eldridge Cleaver and his strategy of Cold War alliance-building in Asia to prepare for a guerrilla war across North America.

== Theory ==
=== Dialectical materialism ===
Intercommunalism is a dialectical materialist ideology. Newton attempted to stretch and redefine the term for a new colonial context in a manner similar to Frantz Fanon. He was also opposed to historical materialism, which Newton saw as dogmatic, or mechanical in its application of dialectics. Newton particularly disagreed with the view that the proletariat would be the sole revolutionary agent, as he continued to believe in the revolutionary potential of the lumpenproletariat.

Newton saw intercommunalism as situated within the tradition of Karl Marx's materialism, but not as a necessarily Marxist ideology. Newton believed that many Marxists "cherish the conclusions which Marx arrived at through his method, but they throw away the method itself – leaving themselves in a totally static posture. That is why most Marxists really are historical materialists: they look to the past to get answers for the future, and that does not work."

=== Reactionary intercommunalism ===
Newton believed that imperialism had developed into a stage of reactionary intercommunalism. Reactionary intercommunalism is typified by the development of a tiny community of elites with a monopoly on technology and state power within a single hegemonic empire (currently the United States).

This 'ruling circle' is different from the Bourgeoisie, which the Panthers treated as a much broader phenomenon. Newton said that "[t]here are very few controllers even in the white middle class. They can barely keep their heads above water, they are paying all the bills, living hand-to-mouth, and they have the extra expense of refusing to live like Black people." The Black bourgeoisie in particular is a "fantasy bourgeoisie" which could be rallied to a revolutionary cause through sufficient education.

The ruling circle's monopoly on technology and education is important to maintaining reactionary intercommunalism, as it prevents the rest of the world's communities from fulfilling their material needs independently of the center, leaving them dependent on the Empire for advancement. The ruling circle uses 'peaceful co-optation' more often than military invasion to reinforce its aims.

Reactionary intercommunalism allows for no independent national sovereignty, as the dominance of the global hegemon means that all nations bend to the 'weight' of its interests. Instead nations have been reduced down to constituent communities, or "a small unit with a comprehensive collection of institutions that exist to serve a small group of people." Each of these communities "want to determine their own destinies," but can only do so by joining into a revolutionary bloc. All of the communities have no superstructure apart from global capitalism, and while they have different economic conditions they are all 'under siege' by the same forces.

Newton believed that if allowed to continue, reactionary intercommunalism would bring more and more of the world's population into the lumpenproletariat, including white workers. However he did not think that this would end racism, in fact he thought white workers would increasingly blame their exploitation on minorities, especially the increasingly proletarianised third world.

=== Revolutionary intercommunalism ===
Intercommunalists believe that Revolutionary Intercommunalism will come about when communities are able to break the technological monopoly of the center. Through technology, communities would be able to solve material contradictions and "develop a culture which is essentially human." Even though the Panthers disavowed the nation-state as a viable form of revolutionary political struggle, they continued to support state socialist countries such as China, North Vietnam and North Korea against American imperialism. Indeed, they were considered the vanguard of revolutionary intercommunalism through liberating territories and establishing provisional governments ahead of the global turn towards revolutionary intercommunalism. However such states could still be co-opted into reactionary intercommunalism through the introduction of western markets.

While the party no longer believed in Black nationalism, they continued to believe that Black Americans would play a special role within the struggle for revolutionary intercommunalism. Due to the Atlantic slave trade, Newton believed that Black Americans were the "first real internationalists" due to their mixed cultural origin and wide dispersal among a range of communities. Since he believed Black Americans constituted a significant force for revolution within the United States, and the destruction of the United States seemed to be a prerequisite for world revolution, the Panthers continued to view Black Americans as "the vanguard of the world revolution."

=== Organizing strategies ===
The Black Panther Party's reorientation towards "survival" or community service programs after 1970 were a direct outgrowth of Newton's formulation of Intercommunalist ideology. The reasoning was that such programs could enable people to meet daily needs, develop positive institutions within communities, and gain political organizing experience. The Panthers felt that other organisations were slow to develop an independent means for providing social welfare in Black communities and so emphasized survival programs as their main organizing effort. Armed patrols, food programs, democratic reforms and even supporting limited Black capitalism would all lead to a more independent community that would be less restricted by a technological-educational monopoly.

Formalized education in a range of subjects was considered the most important element of the local intercommunalist organizing strategy. The Intercommunal Youth Institute had roughly 50 students in 1971, with a curriculum that included literacy, dialectics, physics and mathematics.

Another important Party apparatus for developing intercommunalism was The Black Panther Intercommunal News Service, which aimed to give equal weight to reporting on issues affecting oppressed communities regardless of location, and emphasized the interconnectedness of the issues faced. The BPINS would report on Mozambique, Zimbabwe, Angola, Chile, Puerto Rico, South Africa, Cuba, Namibia, Eritrea, and Palestine.

== Legacy ==
=== Polynesian Intercommunalism ===
Newton's writings on intercommunalism were followed closely by international Panther parties, especially the Polynesian Panthers and Will 'Ilolahia in particular. The peculiarities of organizing in New Zealand as opposed to the United States led 'Ilolahia to adapt the theory of intercommunalism to a local context. Rather than a tri-continental front of Black, Asian and Latin American communities against US Imperialism, the Polynesian Panthers sought to first form an Australasia-Pacific common front that would include all Pacific indigenous peoples, including non-Polynesians. This would be a stepping-stone to a worldwide Black Power front against Empire. 'Ilolahia has suggested that the legacy of slavery made the development of Intercommunalism as a unifying force among Black Americans much more difficult for a variety of economic and linguistic reasons.

=== Israel and Palestine ===
Alex Lubin has argued that Intercommunalism played a role in shaping the international outlook of many Palestinian organisations. For a time, the Black Panther Intercommunal News Service was the only source of information from Palestinian militant organisations in the United States. Groups like the Popular Front for the Liberation of Palestine used the BPINS to issue statements in support of the BPP and Black liberation in general. Lubin also argues that the anti-nationalism of the Israeli Black Panthers, a social justice organization of Mizrahi and Sephardi Jews, was a reflection of Intercommunalist ideology.

=== Post-Marxism ===
Newton was acknowledged as a precursor to Michael Hardt and Antonio Negri's work on imperialism, and other theories of globalisation. In particular the authors cited Newton to support their argument that human liberation would be tied to overcoming racism and other forms of identity oppression, which would allow for a universal identity as part of a multitude.

=== Later Panther political parties ===
Several parties which see themselves as a continuation of the original Black Panther Party have adopted intercommunalism as their ideology. The New Panther Vanguard Movement which formed in response to the 1992 Los Angeles Riots adopted intercommunalism in 1996, before folding in 2002. In December 2020 prison activist Kevin Rashid Johnson and other members split from the New Afrikan Black Panther Party to form the Revolutionary Intercommunalist Black Panther Party, which sought to combine intercommunalism with Maoism.

=== Criticism ===
Intercommunalism was strongly opposed by some Black Panthers, especially those invested in the Party's strategy of forming internationalist alliances with foreign states. Cleaver denounced the Oakland chapter as the 'right wing' of the party for their rejection of guerrilla warfare. Assata Shakur was also critical of the theory's rejection of nationalism, saying that "The problem [with intercommunalism] was that someone had forgotten to tell these oppressed communities they were no longer nations." Others, like Mumia Abu-Jamal thought that intercommunalism was a terrible rhetorical strategy, as few understood the theory and many disliked Newton's public speaking. The differences over intercommunalism were also exacerbated by FBI wire-tapping and fake letters sent between the Oakland and Algiers sections of the party.

== See also ==
- World-systems theory
- Murray Bookchin#Municipalism and communalism
- Temporary Autonomous Zones
- Post-Marxism
- Communalism (South Asia)
