= League for Socialist Reconstruction =

- Abbreviation: LSR
- Founded: 1969
- Dissolved: 24 August 1980
- Preceded by: IUP
- Merged into: NUP
- Newspaper: The Socialist Republic
- Ideology: De Leonism
- Political position: Left-wing

League for Socialist Reconstruction (LSR) was a DeLeonist political organization with sections in New York City and Michigan. Joseph Brandon, Louis Lazarowitz, Sam Brandon and other LSR members had been active in the Industrial Union Party after mass expulsion of the Socialist Labor Party's Section Bronx during the 1920s. The LSR organ, The Socialist Republic, was published until 1980.

At a Unity Conference in Ypsilanti, Michigan from 22 August through 24 August 1980, LSR fused with the New Unionist group of Minneapolis to create the New Union Party.
