= American Labor Party (1932) =

De Leonist splinter group

- Predecessor: Industrial Union League
- Successor: none
- Formation: 1932; 94 years ago
- Founder: Joseph Brandon
- Dissolved: 1935; 91 years ago

The American Labor Party (ALP) was the final name of a De Leonist splinter group in the US in the early 1930s. The ALP had split from the Industrial Union League, which in turn had split from the Socialist Labor Party in the late 1920s.

The leader of the organization was Joseph Brandon, who had been a founding member of the IUL. Brandon insisted that a socialist industrial union had to be created before a party could be established. He was expelled from the IUL in April 1932. Brandon took a few sympathizers and formed the Industrial Union Alliance. When, by the summer of 1933, it became clear that the IUL would turn itself into a political party Brandon tried to reunify with them and changed his organizations name to the Industrial Union Party on June 11. The Industrial Union League also changed its name to the Industrial Union Party on June 14, and filed an injunction against the Brandon faction from using the name. In the New York Supreme Court case Brandon v. Brandon the court sided with the majority group. On October 5 the Brandon group filed a slate of candidates for the November 7 New York municipal election as the "Indus Union". Joseph Brandon was nominated for mayor, Julian Diamond for City Controller, and Harold Leby for president of the Board of Aldermen. Later the name seemed to change to the Industrial Labor party. However, Joseph V. McKee and his Recovery Party brought a suit before the New York City Board of Elections and tried to get several minor parties off the ballot, including the Socialist Labor and regular Industrial Union tickets. Brandon's ticket was the only one to be removed.

By December 10 the group had apparently settled on the name American Labor Party and taken up headquarters at 149 East 42nd street. On January 21 a "Daniel De Leon Forum" was held at the same location when Brandon debated Howard Y. Williams on the efficacy of a Farmer–Labor Party. Brandon debated Jay Bambrick at this same "forum" on February 18. The relationship between this "forum" and the American Labor Party is unclear, but it had at least two events without Brandon: James Oneal give a talk on early American labor thinkers that Christmas Eve, and heard a lecture on the NRA by James Greenhut on March 4, 1935. On June 28, 1935 Brandon gave a talk on the "Policy of the American Labor Party" at the "Industrial Workers School" at 94 Fifth Avenue.

The Industrial Union Party itself largely ignored Brandon thereafter, except ridiculing him for his numerous changes of position and line as "Zig-Zag" Brandon.

The party published nine issues of a monthly periodical American Labor Bulletin until September 1934. This was changed to Labor Power in October 1934, but continued the same numbering. The last known issue was numbered Vol. II #6 June 1935.

== Publications ==
- Joseph Brandon Workers Party vs. Socialist Labor Party New York: Socialist Labor Party, 1925 Arm & hammer pamphlets #8
- Joseph Brandon Ethics and principles of unionism Bronx, NY : Industrial Union League, 1929
- Joseph Brandon Technocracy or democracy; which shall govern our industries? Hollis, NY, C.A. Baker, 1933
- Joseph Brandon Industrial union alliance: manifesto. New York : The Author, 1933
- American Labor Party Labor and state capitalism New York: Labor Party, 1934
- American Labor Party Socialism – the basis for happiness. New York, NY 1934
- American Labor Party Way out of the depression New York, NY 1934
