= Omali Yeshitela =

American political activist (born 1941)

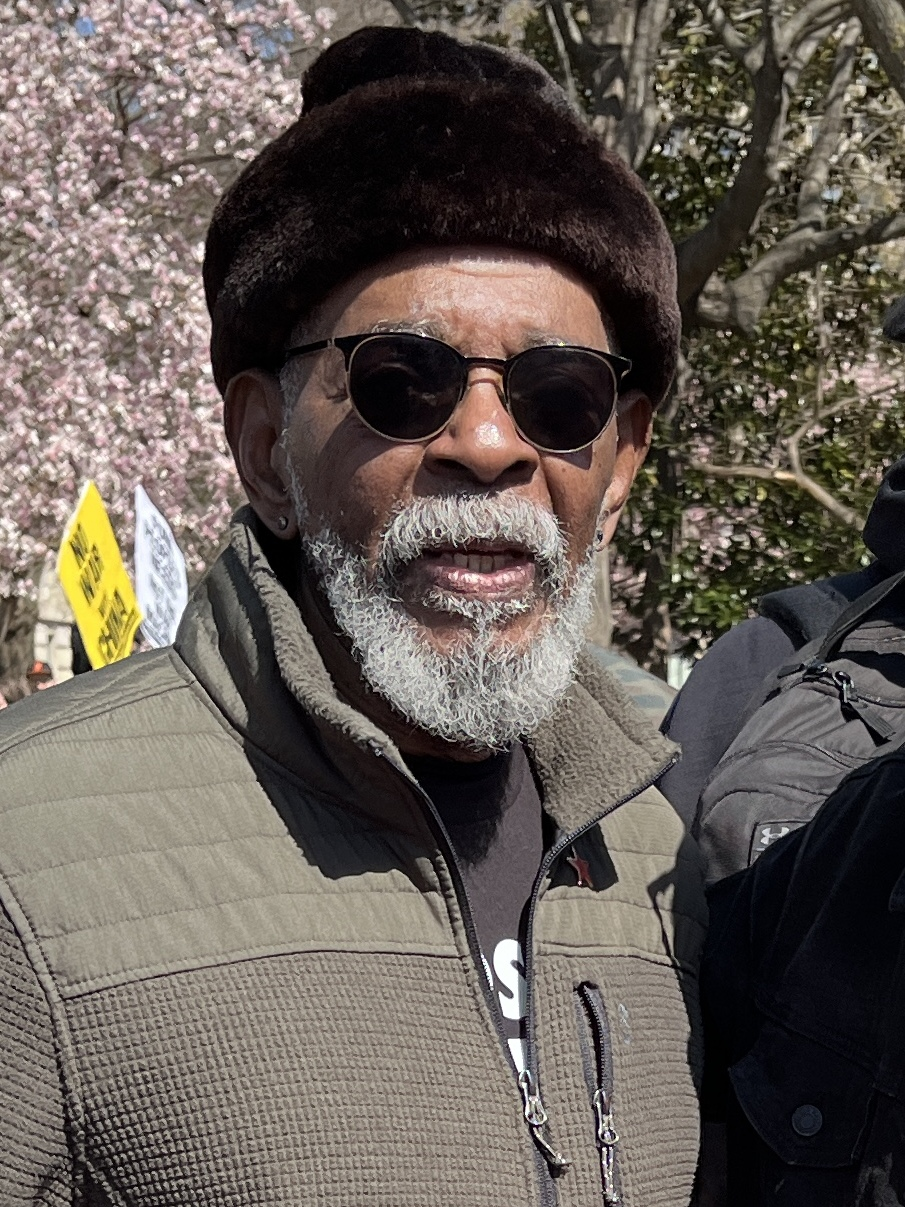
- Yeshitela in 2023
- Born: Joseph Waller; October 9, 1941 (age 85); St. Petersburg, Florida, United States
- Political party: African People's Socialist Party
- Spouse: Ona Zené Yeshitela
- Criminal information
- Status: Convicted, sentenced to three years' probation and 300 hours community service
- Conviction: Conspiracy to Act as an Agent of a Foreign Government (September 12, 2024)
- Criminal charge: 18 U.S.C. § 951 Conspiracy to Act as an Agent of a Foreign Government
- Website: apspuhuru.org

Omali Yeshitela (born Joseph Waller; October 9, 1941) is an American far-left political activist and author. Ideologically a Pan-Africanist and African socialist, he is a co-founder and current chairman of the African People's Socialist Party. Yeshitela has advocated for reparations for African Americans due to the slavery of Black people in the United States and Jim Crow laws.

In September 2024 Yeshitela was convicted in U.S. federal court of conspiring to act as an agent of the Russian government. Yeshitela conspired with Alexander Ionov, a Russian agent taking directions from the FSB to spread pro-Russian propaganda in the United States. In December 2024, Yeshitela was sentenced to three years' probation and 300 hours of community service.

== Early background ==
Omali Yeshitela was born Joseph Waller in St. Petersburg, Florida, in 1941. Yeshitela joined the Army in 1958 and experienced racist treatment during his service. He returned to St. Petersburg, Florida, following his discharge from the US Army in 1963. Historian Donna Murch described the black working-class activists who came of age between the 1955 lynching of Emmett Till and the 1965 assassination of Malcolm X as "the Black Power Generation".

Yeshitela participated in the civil rights movement in as a member of the Student Nonviolent Coordinating Committee (SNCC). He established the St. Petersburg chapter of the SNCC in 1966.

== Tearing down of the City Hall mural ==
The St. Petersburg City Hall had a degrading mural reflected the minstrel culture that was popular throughout American media during the height of Jim Crow. George Snow Hill's "Picnicking at the Pass-a-Grille" was one of two images that had been displayed in St. Petersburg City Hall since 1945. "Picnicking at the Pass-a-Grille" depicted blackface musicians with exaggerated features and white paint around their mouths entertaining white beachgoers. Its companion piece entitled "Fishing at the Pier" depicted white families with normal features enjoying a relaxing day of fishing. Bill DeYoung, a former correspondent with the St. Petersburg Times noted that these murals were suggested to represent "everyday life in St. Petersburg". The black community had opposed the mural for two decades, since its installation. For the African community of St. Petersburg, "The mural bitterly represented the place that colonized black people were relegated to in this city, where African people were forced to function as oppressed servants to the white tourist industry and elderly white retirees." As well, "The offensive mural represented a city where African people for decades were confined to housing in a small, two-mile square area of south St. Petersburg that was subjected to a curfew after 9 p.m. every night."

Herman Goldner, the Mayor of St. Petersburg rejected the demands made by Yeshitela and SNCC stating, "our minorities had to learn to be less sensitive." Goldner also stated: "I find nothing offensive in the portrayal of strolling troubadours and picnickers at Pass-a-Grille Beach.... I think you know that I, personally, am not a racist. I think... that all of our minority groups must mature to the point where self-consciousness is not a motivating factor for complaints."

The mural incident was prompted by white reporters and cops laughing at an older African woman who spoke at a December 29, 1966 demonstration at St. Petersburg City Hall. Yeshitela and five other SNCC members entered City Hall, removed the "Picnicking at the Pass-A-Grille" mural, walked through downtown carrying it, and were arrested by the city police. The incident hit the news wire and was covered by a variety of media sources throughout the United States including Jet Magazine which covered the incident in a two page spread.

Yeshitela was sentenced to state prison for the mural incident. He served two years in prison.

== Junta of Militant Organizations ==
In 1968, while in prison, Omali Yeshitela organized the Junta of Militant Organizations (JOMO). JOMO became an anti-colonial African revolutionary organization in Florida. JOMO also developed a presence in other parts of the US South, including Louisville, Kentucky. In 1969, JOMO founded The Burning Spear Newspaper, the oldest Black Power newspaper in continuous print.

== African People's Socialist Party ==
Yeshitela co-founded the African People's Socialist Party in May 1972 through the fusion of three Florida-based organizations: the Junta of Militant Organizations (JOMO), based in St. Petersburg, Florida, led by Yeshitela, the Black Rights Fighters based in Ft. Myers, Florida, led by Lawrence Mann, and the Black Study Group based in Gainesville, Florida, led by Katura Carey.

== Later activities ==
In his civic activism in his native St. Petersburg, Yeshitela has stressed his view that political and economic development will bring an end to the oppression of African communities throughout the world. He moved to Oakland, California, in 1981, living and working there.

== Publications ==
Yeshitela has self-published several books and pamphlets with the African People's Socialist Party's Burning Spear Uhuru Publications:

- On African Internationalism, 1978
- Tactics and Strategy for Black Liberation in the US, 1978
- The Struggle for Bread, Peace and Black Power, 1981
- Stolen Black Labor, 1982
- Reparations Now!, 1983
- A New Beginning and Not One Step Backwards, 1984
- The Road to Socialism is Painted Black, 1987
- Izwe Lethu i Afrika! (Africa Is Our Land), 1991
- Social Justice and Economic Development for the African Community: Why I became a Revolutionary, 1997
- The Dialectics of Black Revolution: The Struggle to Defeat the Counterinsurgency in the U.S., 1997
- Overturning the Culture of Violence, by Penny Hess and Omali Yeshitela, 2000 (ISBN 978-1891624025)
- One Africa! One Nation!, 2006 (ISBN 978-1891624049)
- Omali Yeshitela Speaks: African Internationalism, Political Theory for our Time, 2005 (ISBN 978-1891624032)
- One People! One Party! One Destiny!, 2010 (ISBN 978-1891624070)
- An Uneasy Equilibrium: The African Revolution Versus Parasitic Capitalism, 2014 (ISBN 978-1891624117)
- Vanguard: The Advanced Detachment of the African Revolution, 2018

== See also ==
- African socialism
- African People's Socialist Party
- Uhuru Movement
- Ujamaa

== Bibliography ==
- Carl B. Klockars, Sanja Kutnjak Ivković, Maria R. Haberfeld, Enhancing Police Integrity, 2006 (ISBN 978-0387369549).
- Tom Dreisbach, "Uhuru Are You? Meet the little-known black power group behind a well-known institution", Philadelphia Citypaper, August 12, 2009.
- Navarro, Mireya (November 15, 1996). "Officials in St. Petersburg Call Racial Unrest 'Calculated'". The New York Times.
- Rick Bragg, "Effort to Heal Old Racial Wounds Brings New Discord", The New York Times, July 3, 1999.
