= New Union Party =

United States political party

- Abbreviation: NUP
- Founder: Jeffrey Miller
- Founded: 24 August 1980
- Dissolved: 2005
- Merger of: LSR; New Unionist group
- Ideology: De Leonism
- Political position: Left-wing

The New Union Party was a De Leonist political party based primarily in the U.S. state of Minnesota from 1980 to 2005. Its ideology was primarily based on the ideas of Daniel De Leon. According to De Leonist theory, militant industrial unions are the vehicle of class struggle. Industrial unions serving the interests of the proletariat (working class) will bring about the change needed to establish a socialist system. A strict adherent to pacifism, the NUP denounced political violence as a method of achieving revolution.

== Ideology ==
The NUP was, like all similar organizations, based on the ideas on Karl Marx, Frederich Engels, and Daniel De Leon. Rather than insurrection, it was committed to legal, non-violent means of overthrowing capitalism. It opposed state control of the economy and instead sought direct worker control over the means of production.

== History ==
=== Origins ===
Many of its members were formerly affiliated with that state's section of Socialist Labor Party of America. The New Unionists was formed after eight members of the Minneapolis SLP resigned in protest, accusing the national SLP leadership of bureaucratic and authoritarian practices. At a Unity Conference in Ypsilanti, Michigan from 22 August through 24 August 1980, the similarly-minded League for Socialist Reconstruction fused with the New Unionist group to create the New Union Party.

=== Newspaper ===
Jeffrey Miller of Minneapolis was the editor of the party's newspaper, New Unionist, which was published from 1978 to 2005. Among the paper's columnists was longtime member Tom Dooley, who died in 2017. Miller died in 2019.

=== Activism ===
The New Union Party, like other De Leonist groups, ran candidates for political office and organized workers outside of electoral campaigns. In the 1980s, Jeffrey Miller was the party's nominee for three elections:

- 1980: Minnesota's 5th congressional district (1.4%), third place of five candidates.
- 1982 United States Senate election in Minnesota, 3,300 votes (5th place of 5 candidates).
- 1984 United States Senate election in Minnesota, 4,653 votes (4th place of 5 candidates).

In 1999, delegates from the NUP attended an International Solidarity Conference in San Francisco organized by the local branch of the Industrial Workers of the World and Workers' Solidarity Alliance. It presented on the contributions of Daniel De Leon to socialist theory.

== Archives ==
The party's website is archived by the Library of Congress. Party ephemera and its publications are held at Washington State University Libraries Manuscripts, Archives, and Special Collections.
