= Socialism and Democracy =

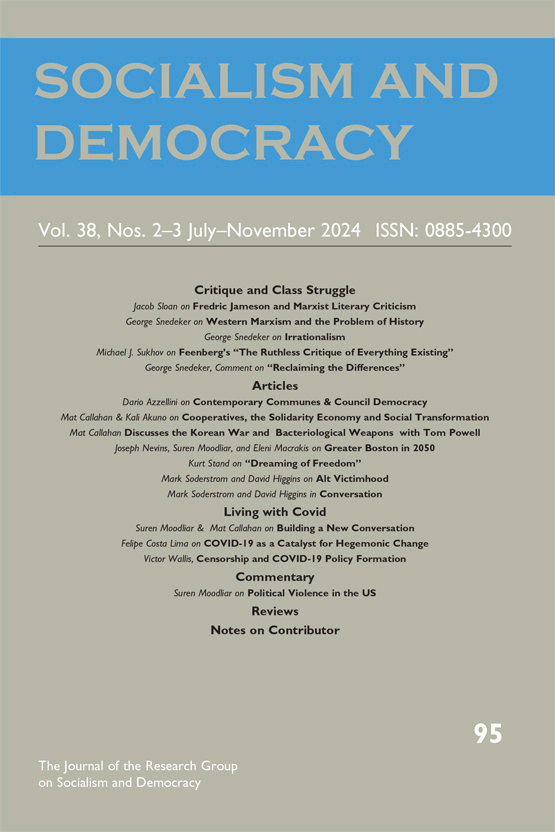
- Discipline: Sociology, political science
- Language: English
- Edited by: Suren Moodliar

Publication details
- History: 1985–present
- Publisher: Routledge on behalf of the Research Group on Socialism and Democracy
- Frequency: Triannual

Standard abbreviations
- ISO 4: Social. Democr.

Indexing
- ISSN: 0885-4300 (print); 1745-2635 (web)
- LCCN: 87640271
- OCLC no.: 60625225

Links
- Journal homepage; Online access

Socialism and Democracy is a triannual peer-reviewed academic journal established in 1985. It is published by Routledge and the editor-in-chief is Suren Moodliar. The journal is broadly Marxist and writes from a socialist perspective on many topics. In the Norwegian Scientific Index, the journal has been listed as "Level 0" since 2014, which indicates the journal is non-academic and publications in the journal do not count for public research funding.
