= Alexander Ionov =

Russian businessman and political figure

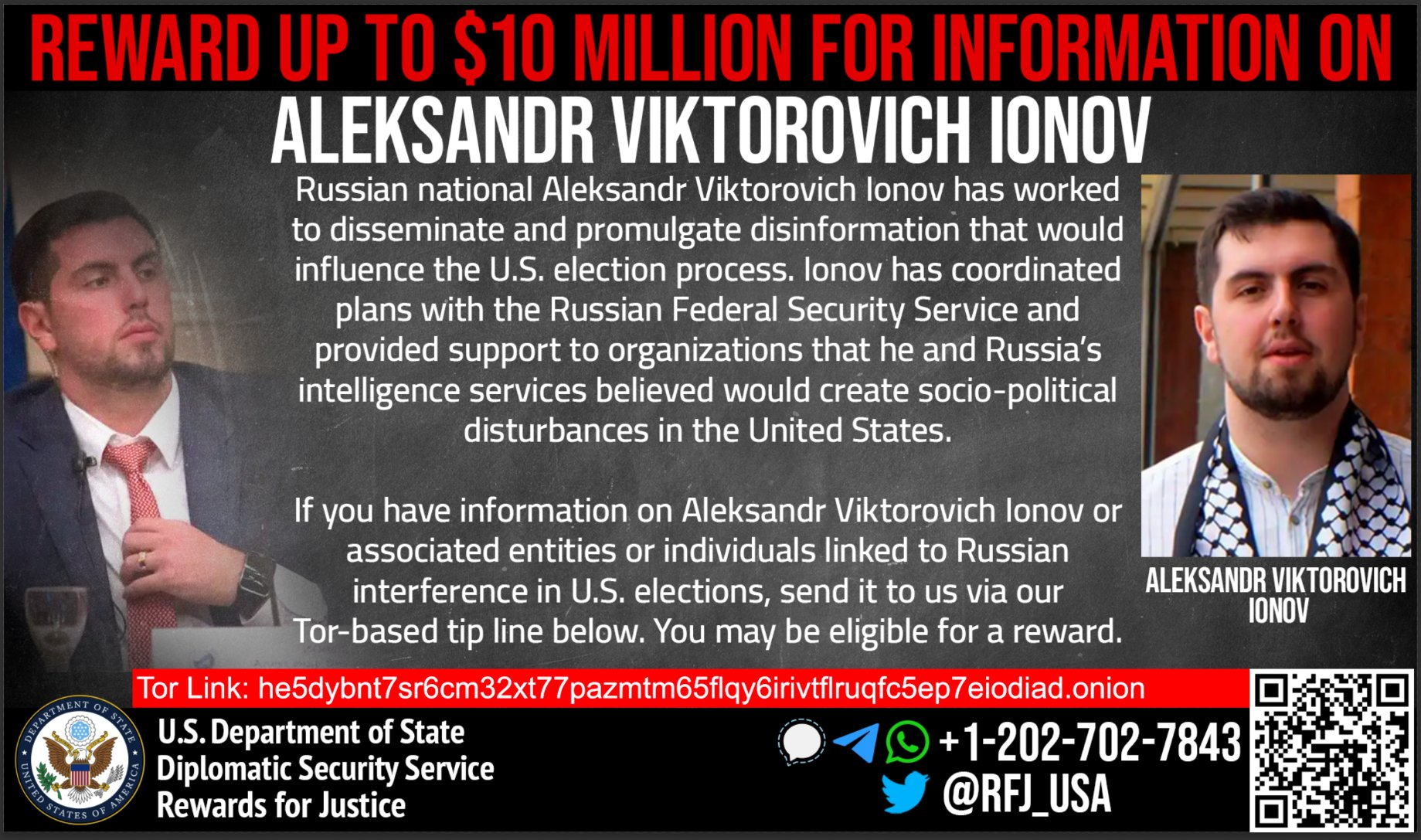
The Rewards for Justice Program of the U.S. State Department offers $10 million for information about Aleksandr Viktorovich Ionov

Alexander Viktorovich Ionov (Russian: Александр Викторович Ионов; born December 12, 1989) is a Russian businessman and political figure living in Moscow. He is the head of the Anti-Globalization Movement of Russia (AGMR), which promotes secession movements in countries other than Russia. In July 2022, the United States Department of the Treasury imposed sanctions on Ionov and on three groups he is said to lead, including the AGMR.

== Anti-Globalization Movement of Russia (AGMR) ==
Alexander Ionov, who began his political career in 2009 in Russia's Communist Party youth organization, became president of the Anti-Globalization Movement of Russia (AGMR) in 2011. In 2012, according to the Robert Lansing Institute, Ionov "got the diploma of technical service manager-economist at Moscow State Agro-Engineering University... He obtained his master’s degree in 2014, in vocational education."

In 2014, the AGMR hosted a small conference of secessionist groups whose speakers included Michael Hill head of "Southern secession" group the League of the South. Ionov organized a larger conference in 2015, which became the first of several "Dialogue of Nations" events hosted by AGMR that brought representatives of many separatist groups to Moscow. In addition to US and EU secessionist groups, the 2015 event in Moscow's President hotel included Russian-backed separatists from eastern Ukraine. The 2015 event, billing itself as the International Russian Conservative Forum, was held in St. Petersburg on 22 March 2015.

BBC News described AGMR's 2016 event as "a conference of Western secession movements," with representatives from secession-promoting groups based in California, Texas, Puerto Rico, Hawaii, and Northern Ireland. Ionov told reporters that the Russian government supported the 2016 conference, contributing 30% of its cost, but denied that Russian government money was paid directly to any Americans.

The AGMR also provided "Yes California" founder Louis J. Marinelli with office space in Moscow for what The New York Times described as "an 'embassy' of California in Russia."

== Criminal charges ==
Alexander Ionov was charged by a US Dept. of Justice indictment unsealed on July 29, 2022. He is accused of working on behalf of the Russian government and in conjunction with the Russian Federal Security Service (FSB) and orchestrating a years-long foreign malign influence campaign that used various U.S. political groups to sow discord, spread pro-Russian propaganda, and interfere in elections within the United States. According to the indictment, Ionov is accused of providing support to political campaigns in Florida, advocating for California's secession from the United States, and financing a protest tour in solidarity with a petition denouncing the alleged "genocide" of African people within the country.

In September, 2024 jury found Omali Yeshitela, Penny Hess, and Augustus C. Romain, Jr. guilty of conspiracy to act as agents of a foreign government. They were leaders of the African People's Socialist Party or components thereof and cooperated with Alexander Ionov. They were sentenced to probation and community service.

== Reward offer ==
Starting February 2023, the Rewards for Justice Program of the United States Department of State offered up to $10 million USD for information about the activities of Ionov.
