= Independent Party (Florida) =

Floridian Political Party

The Independent Party was a political party formed in Florida in the wake of schisms between African Americans and northerners who came south after the American Civil War and became involved in Florida politics during the Reconstruction era. It also sought to appeal to disaffected Democrats.

The party held a convention in June 1884 in Live Oak, Florida where Frank W. Pope, a former Democrat, was nominated as their gubernatorial candidate in that year's election.

Pope faced the threat of lynching in Madison County where allegations of election fraud and murderous violence were documented in 1882. Democrats won the election in 1884 and imposed restrictions on who could register thereafter, blocking most African Americans from voting and solidifying their party's control.

== See also ==
- 1884 Florida gubernatorial election
