= National Amerindianist American Redman's Party =

US political party (1972–1976)

- Leader: Frank Wolf
- President: Steven Penn
- Chairperson: Alexis W. Wolf
- Secretary: Bertram Walker
- Secretary-General: Tapa Machunashi
- Founder: Frank Wolf
- Founded: 1972
- Dissolved: 1976
- Headquarters: Lincoln, Nebraska
- Ideology: National Amerindianism; Red Power; Indigenism; Indigenous supremacism; Racial nationalism; Pan-Indianism; Pan-Asianism; Socialism; Third-Worldism; Anti-imperialism; Anti-Americanism; Anti-miscegenation
- Political position: Syncretic

The National Amerindianist American Redman's Party (NAARP) was a Native American socialist political party in the United States. It was founded in 1972 amidst the wider American Indian Movement in Lincoln, Nebraska. The NAARP was active throughout much of the Red Power movement of the 1970s.

== Ideology and political positions ==
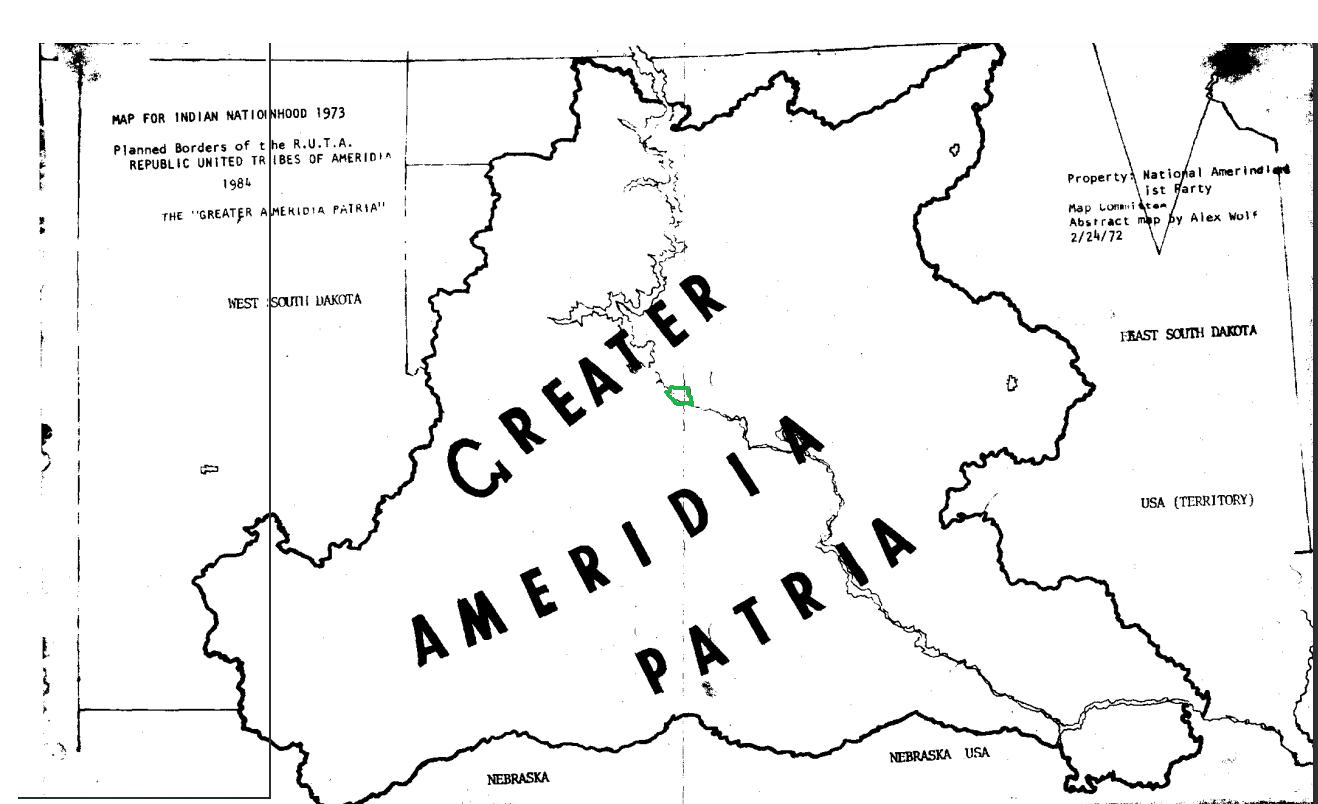
Map of the Greater Ameridia Patria, proposed by the NAARP in 1973. Proposed capital of Tecumseh in Green

The party named its ideology "national Amerindianism." It argued against the capitalist and liberal democratic systems, which it considered corrupt and irresponsible, as well as what it termed the "white hegemony" present in the United States. It was in favor of a socialist, centralized Native republic under one party.

The NAARP argued for the eventual decolonization of the entirety of the Americas by demographic resettlement by Asians (who the NAARP refers to as Mongolian) and Native Americans (under the umbrella term of "Erythrosian ethnicity"), in a process it compared to Israeli settlements. To help achieve this, the NAARP advocated for the creation of a strong army and air force, along with the use of five-year plans to industrialize the country. In addition, the NAARP also believed in the formation of an alliance with nations in Asia and natives in South America to help realize this. Part of the proposed decolonization process was the acquisition of reparations from the United States.

The NAARP strongly supported anti-miscegenation laws, calling for a refusal to recognize Native Americans as those who have "alien strain", though the NAARP did not consider Asian Americans and South Americans to be "alien". It considered Native Americans to be racially and politically superior to other groups.

The NAARP had a 28-point party platform, which was submitted to the UN on May 18, 1973. The platform included policies such as implementing socialism as the structure of the state arguing that socialism was the traditional mode of production in Pre-Columbian society, the creation of a new capital "Tecumseh", the formation of a one-party state, economic compensation from America, the resettlement of the American continents "by and for the Mongolian and Erythrosian humanity", the development of Pan-Asian diplomacy, and the return of the Black population to Africa.

== See also ==
- Ethnocacerism
- International Indian Treaty Council
- Mohawk Warrior Society
- New Left
- Third World socialism
