= List of U.S. state legislators =

The following list articles cover the current U.S. state legislators:

- List of U.S. state senators
- List of U.S. state representatives (Alabama to Missouri)
- List of U.S. state representatives (Montana to Wyoming)
