= De Leonism =

Marxist ideology

De Leonism, also known as Marxism–De Leonism, is a Marxist tendency developed by Curaçaoan-American trade union organizer and theoretician Daniel De Leon (1852–1914). De Leon was a leader of the Socialist Labor Party of America (SLP) from 1890 until his death, during which time he developed the theory of socialist industrial unionism as a revolutionary strategy.

De Leonist theory advocates dual organization – the simultaneous building of socialist industrial unions in workplaces and a socialist political party to achieve revolutionary change through both economic and political action. This approach distinguishes De Leonism from both Leninist vanguardism and pure syndicalism, proposing instead a "peaceful" revolution achieved through electoral victory combined with workplace organization. The theory envisions workers electing representatives to an "All-Industrial Congress" that would replace traditional government structures, with both the political party and the state ultimately withering away.

Despite De Leon's theoretical innovations and international influence—including on British socialist education through the Plebs' League and figures like Noah Ablett—De Leonist organizations have been widely criticized for sectarianism and dogmatism. This contributed to organizational splits, including the 1901 formation of the Socialist Party of America by dissident SLP members, and the eventual decline of De Leonist parties worldwide. The original Socialist Labor Party of America ceased operations in 2008, though De Leonism's emphasis on industrial unionism and dual organization contributed to the development of revolutionary labor theory and influenced later thinkers including Antonio Gramsci.

== Historical development ==
The development of De Leonist theory occurred over a 25-year period, shaped by Daniel De Leon's evolving understanding of American labor conditions and his practical experiences with various socialist and labor organizations.

=== Early influences and academic career ===
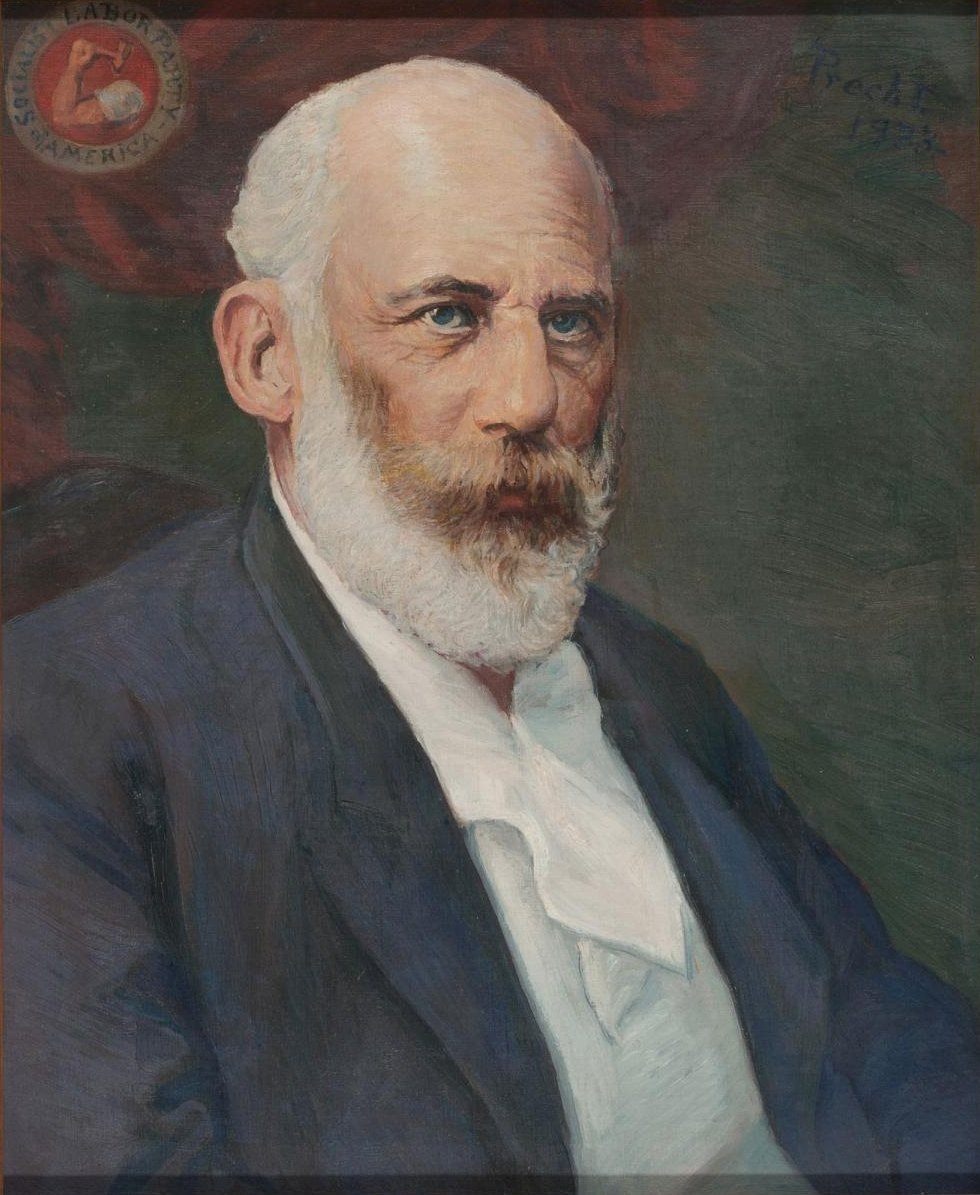
Portrait of Daniel De Leon

Daniel De Leon was born on December 14, 1852, in Curaçao, and arrived in the United States in 1874. After earning a law degree from Columbia University with honors in 1878, he practiced law briefly before returning to Columbia as a lecturer in international law from 1883 to 1889. His academic career ended when he was not reappointed in 1889, possibly due to his increasing political activities.

De Leon's entry into socialist politics began through his involvement with Edward Bellamy's Nationalist movement in 1888, inspired by Bellamy's utopian novel Looking Backward. Dissatisfied with the middle-class nature of the Bellamy movement, he joined the Knights of Labor, then the most prominent mass labor organization in America.

=== Socialist Labor Party period and theoretical development ===
In 1890, De Leon joined the Socialist Labor Party of America, becoming assistant editor of its newspaper The People in 1891 and chief editor in 1892, a position he held until his death in 1914. His theoretical development occurred in distinct phases, moving from attempting to work within existing labor organizations to developing his distinctive approach to revolutionary change.

Initially, De Leon held "illusions about the possibility of revolutionary socialists gaining control of the American Federation of Labor and the Knights of Labor" through a strategy of "boring from within." However, after several years of unsuccessful attempts to radicalize these organizations, he became "completely disenchanted with the mass unions."

=== Formation of the Socialist Trade and Labor Alliance ===
This disillusionment led to a pivotal development in De Leonist theory. In 1895, De Leon was instrumental in forming the Socialist Trade and Labor Alliance (STLA), "the first labor union in the U.S. to declare the necessity of replacing capitalism by social ownership of the industries." The STLA represented the practical application of De Leon's evolving ideas about revolutionary industrial unionism, embodying "some of the principles set forth in Daniel De Leon's speech" and marking his break from attempts to reform existing labor organizations.

=== Crystallization of De Leonist theory ===
The theoretical culmination of De Leon's ideas came with his 1904 address The Burning Question of Trades Unionism, which "marks the first decided advance in Socialist theory since the time of Marx." By this time, De Leon had not yet fully developed his "socialist industrial union" program, with the nearly complete development taking place around 1904. His concept was "no Utopian blueprint dreamed up in a vacuum," but rather "was developed as a result of his active participation in the labor movement, first in the Knights of Labor and later in the STLA."

=== Industrial Workers of the World and final years ===
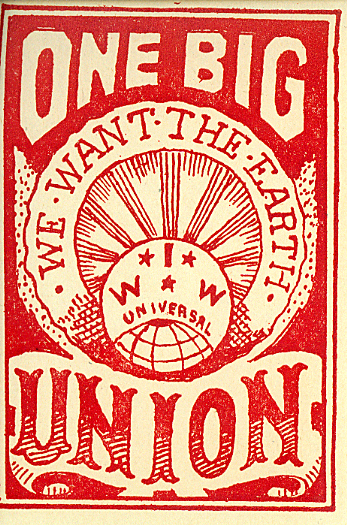
A "stickerette" or "silent agitator" produced by the Industrial Workers of the World.

In 1905, De Leon helped found the Industrial Workers of the World (IWW), merging the STLA into the new organization. However, his participation was short-lived due to conflicts over political strategy, as IWW "extremists" "rejected political activity of the sort that he advocated and who favoured more violent tactics." When De Leon died on May 11, 1914, he had left "both a clear concept of the socialist goal in America—a democratic cooperative commonwealth based on industry—and a programmatic conception—socialist industrial unionism—for achieving that goal."

== Revolutionary strategy ==
The practical implementation of De Leonist theory relies on a specific revolutionary strategy that emphasizes coordinated action across both political and economic spheres. According to this approach, workers would simultaneously form socialist industrial unions in the workplaces and a socialist political party that would organize in the political realm. This dual organization would build strength until achieving sufficient support for a victory at the polls, at which point the political party would be voted into office, giving the De Leonist program a mandate from the people. The theory assumes that by this stage, the socialist industrial unions will have attained sufficient strength in the workplaces for workers to take control of the means of production.

This electoral and workplace victory would then be accompanied by a transfer of control of the factories, mines, farms, and other means of production to workers councils organized within the industrial unions. De Leonists distinguish this revolutionary moment from the general strike to take control of the workplaces advocated by anarcho-syndicalists and refer to it instead as a "general lockout of the ruling class".

Following this transfer of power, the existing government would be replaced with a government elected from within the socialist industrial unions, and the newly elected socialist government would quickly enact whatever constitutional amendments or other changes in the structure of government needed to bring this about, adjourning sine die. Workers on the shop floor would elect local shop floor committees needed to continue production and representatives to local and national councils representing their particular industry.

The new governmental structure would be fundamentally different from traditional political systems. Workers would elect representatives to a congress, called an All-Industrial Congress, which would effectively function as the government. These representatives would be subject to a recall vote at any time. De Leonism would thus reorganize the national government along industrial lines with representatives elected by industry rather than by geographical districts.

== Relationship to other socialist movements ==
This distinctive approach to revolutionary change and governmental organization sets De Leonism apart from other socialist traditions in several key ways.

=== Comparison with Leninism ===
De Leonism lies outside the Leninist tradition of communism, predating it by over a decade. De Leonism's principles developed in the early 1890s, while Leninism and its idea of a vanguard party took shape after the 1902 publication of Lenin's What Is to Be Done? The fundamental difference lies in their approach to revolutionary leadership: De Leonism depends on achieving majority support among the people both in the workplace and at the polls, contrasting sharply with the Leninist notion that a small vanguard party should lead the working class.

De Leonism is generally opposed to the policies of the former Soviet Union, China, and other socialist states, which it does not consider socialist but rather state capitalist or following "bureaucratic state despotism." The decentralized nature of the proposed De Leonist government contrasts with the democratic centralism of Marxism–Leninism.

=== Relationship with democratic socialism and syndicalism ===
Despite rejecting Leninist vanguardism, De Leonism also lies outside the "democratic socialist" and "social democratic" traditions. De Leonists have issued frequent polemics against democratic socialist movements, especially the Socialist Party of America, considering them reformist or "bourgeois socialist." This anti-reformist stance places De Leonism in the "impossibilist" tradition alongside the Socialist Party of Great Britain.

While sharing characteristics with syndicalism, De Leonism distinguishes itself through its emphasis on dual organization—combining industrial unions with political party activity. Traditional syndicalists often reject political action entirely, whereas De Leonists view both economic and political organization as necessary for revolutionary change.

=== International influence ===
De Leon's theoretical contributions proved influential to socialist movements internationally, particularly his concept of achieving a relatively "peaceful" or bloodless revolution. His ideas influenced the formation of various socialist labor parties across the English-speaking world and contributed to the development of industrial unionism as a revolutionary strategy.

== Criticism and reception ==
De Leonism and Daniel De Leon's leadership have been subject to extensive scholarly analysis and contemporary criticism, with assessments ranging from recognition of his theoretical contributions to condemnation of his sectarian methods.

=== Contemporary socialist criticism ===
De Leon faced significant opposition from within the American socialist movement during his lifetime. Friedrich Engels was critical of the Socialist Labor Party under De Leon's influence, referring to it as "the decay of the specifically German party in America" in 1890. Engels warned that if socialists "stand aloof, they will dwindle down into a dogmatic sect and be brushed aside as people who do not understand their own principles."

The most significant organizational challenge to De Leon's leadership came in 1899 when a dissident faction led by Morris Hillquit left the SLP and formed what became the Socialist Party of America in 1901, merging with Eugene V. Debs's Social Democratic Party. This split was driven by dissatisfaction with "Daniel De Leon, the dogmatic leader of the Socialist Labor Party" who "alienated many both within and outside the party through his attempt to impose too rigid a discipline upon its membership."

De Leon's conflicts extended to his participation in the Industrial Workers of the World, where his advocacy for political action conflicted with other leaders who favored direct action. He was eventually expelled from the IWW after calling proponents of that organization "slum proletarians."

=== Sectarian and dogmatic approach ===
Contemporary and historical assessments consistently criticize De Leon's sectarian methods. Members and supporters of the SLP were "expelled from the Knights of Labor in 1895 because of their sectarian and dogmatic approach to labor struggles and organizing." This led De Leon to make what critics consider "one of the most disastrous" decisions by forming the separate Socialist Trade and Labor Alliance (STLA), "thus isolating a more politically advanced layer of workers from the broader class."

Scholars have characterized De Leon as "a dogmatic idealist, devoted brain and soul to a cause, a zealot who could not tolerate heresy or backsliding, a doctrinaire who would make no compromise with principles." The sectarian approach led to mass departures from the SLP, with so many members leaving that "De Leon remarked that he had to look at himself in the mirror at least once a day to find out whether he had not gone with the others."

=== Theoretical and strategic limitations ===
Academic analysis has identified several fundamental problems with De Leonist theory and practice. Critics argue that De Leon's "failure to understand that workers could struggle for immediate improvements" had "catastrophic consequences for De Leonism's intervention in the class struggle, leading directly to a rejection of revolutionary work within the mass organizations of the proletariat."

The International Communist Current has noted a fundamental contradiction in De Leonist strategy: "It is indeed ironic that at the same time that De Leon rejected the possibility of reforms within capitalism...he believed the proletariat could peaceably take over control of the bourgeois state through the use of the ballot." This approach has been criticized for accepting "at face value capitalism's own propaganda" regarding electoral processes.

=== Electoral and organizational failures ===
The practical consequences of De Leonist methods were significant organizational decline. The STLA "shrank from 15,000 workers to 1,500 in the decade of its existence," effectively cutting the movement off "from the broader working class movement." The SLP's electoral performance was "quite mixed, reflecting the narrow and sectarian outlook of the party."

After De Leon's death, the movement continued to decline. Critics noted that the SLP became "too repressive, one-dimensional, eschewing all socialists but De Leon and those he approved of" and ultimately became "an ultimately meaningless and inconsequential socialist sect, superseded by the new Communist Parties of the Third International."

=== Positive scholarly assessments ===
Despite extensive criticism, De Leon has received recognition for his theoretical contributions. Economist Joseph Schumpeter, described as "a Harvard capitalist economist who hated Marx," nevertheless stated that "De Leon was the one American who carried on scientific work done on Marxist lines." Historian Paul Buhle noted that "He was the first English-speaking intellectual to influence long-run trends in the American Left" and praised his ability to "elucidate powerful notions about the evolution of industrial society."

Vladimir Lenin reportedly called De Leon "the greatest of modern Socialists—the only one who has added anything to Socialist thought since Marx." De Leon's theoretical influence extended internationally, with his "hopes for peaceful and bloodless revolution" influencing Antonio Gramsci's concept of passive revolution.

Even critics acknowledged his intellectual capabilities, with opponents conceding that "he possessed a tremendous intellectual grasp of Marxism" and describing him as "by any measure, a man of considerable education and talent, who turned his back on a successful career as a law professor at Columbia University to embrace the socialist movement."

== Legacy and influence ==
De Leonist ideas exercised significant influence on socialist movements worldwide, despite the practical limitations of the organizations that promoted them. This influence extended from educational movements to the formation of political parties across multiple continents.

=== British Labour movement and educational influence ===
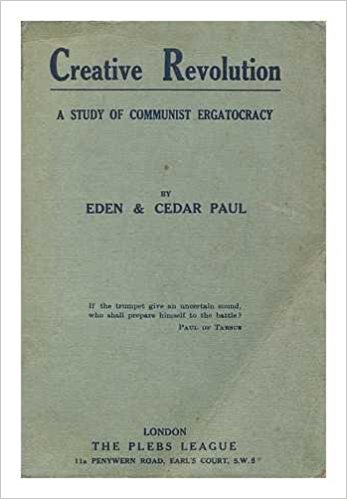
Creative revolution, a study of communist ergatocracy, published by The Plebs' League in 1920

One of the most significant manifestations of De Leonist influence occurred in Britain, particularly through the Plebs' League and its impact on working-class education. The League was formed in November 1908 by Ruskin College students dissatisfied with the college's anti-Marxist educational policy. The name "Plebs' League" was taken directly from De Leon's pamphlet Two Pages from Roman History, demonstrating the direct intellectual lineage.

The League's most prominent figure was Noah Ablett, a South Wales miners' agent who became "completely self-educated" after reading the works of Karl Marx, Daniel De Leon, and Tom Mann. Ablett's synthesis of De Leonist ideas with British working-class conditions led to the publication of The Miners' Next Step (1912), a landmark document in British syndicalism that influenced Aneurin Bevan and shaped the militant Welsh mining movement.

The Plebs' League established The Plebs Magazine in 1909, which became "the most important sustained early 20th century effort to promote the study of Marxism among British workers." With financial support from the South Wales Miners' Federation and the National Union of Railwaymen, they created a network of Labour Colleges based on Marxist education, explicitly aimed at developing "class consciousness of the workers by propaganda and education."

=== International De Leonist parties ===
De Leon's organizational model inspired the formation of socialist parties across the English-speaking world, though most experienced limited success and eventual decline.

==== Britain ====
The Socialist Labour Party was established in Edinburgh on June 7, 1903, by supporters of Daniel De Leon who split from the Social Democratic Federation. Despite beginning with only 80 members in Scotland, the party wielded intellectual influence far beyond its size. The SLP emerged as "the single most important distributor of Marxist literature in Great Britain" and influenced virtually everyone involved in founding the Communist Party of Great Britain. However, internal divisions over joining the CPGB led to splits in 1920, with key figures like Arthur MacManus and William Paul leaving to join the Communist Party.

==== Australia ====
The Socialist Labor Party (Australia) was founded in 1901, emerging from the Australian Socialist League which had shifted toward De Leonist ideas in the late 1890s. The party introduced the Industrial Workers of the World to Australia and established its first branch in 1908. In 1920, member Percy Brookfield won the seat of Sturt and held the balance of power in the New South Wales assembly, but was murdered the following year. The party rapidly declined after the Australian Labor Party adopted socialist objectives in 1921.

==== Canada ====
The Socialist Labour Party (Canada) was established in 1894–1896 by Canadian supporters of the American SLP. Like its counterparts elsewhere, it remained small and was eventually superseded by larger socialist movements, including the Co-operative Commonwealth Federation (CCF), which became the New Democratic Party.

=== Theoretical contributions and limitations ===
De Leonism's lasting theoretical contribution lies in its articulation of dual power theory—the simultaneous building of political and economic organizations—and its vision of peaceful revolutionary transition through electoral and workplace action. This approach influenced later theorists, including Antonio Gramsci's concept of passive revolution.

However, the practical failure of De Leonist organizations worldwide demonstrated the limitations of the approach. Critics note that the theory's rejection of reformism while maintaining faith in bourgeois electoral processes created an internal contradiction that hampered effective political action.

=== Modern remnants and decline ===
The original Socialist Labor Party of America closed its national office on September 1, 2008, ending over a century of continuous operation. While small De Leonist organizations continue to exist, including the New Union Party and remnant SLP groups, they operate with minimal membership and political influence.

The historical significance of De Leonism lies not in its practical success but in its theoretical innovations and its role in educating several generations of socialist activists worldwide. Its emphasis on industrial unionism contributed to the development of revolutionary labor theory, while its educational legacy through institutions like the Plebs' League helped shape working-class political consciousness in the early 20th century.

== Political parties ==
- American Labor Party (1932)
- Industrial Union Party
- League for Socialist Reconstruction
- New Union Party
- Socialist Labor Party (Australia)
- Socialist Labour Party (Canada)
- Socialist Labour Party (UK, 1903)
- Socialist Labor Party of America
- Socialist Union Party

== See also ==
- Anarcho-syndicalism
- Democratic socialism
- Economic democracy
- Impossibilism
- Industrial Workers of the World
- Left communism
