= Independent Anti-Mormon Party of Oneida County =

1870's minor political party

The bipartisan Independent Anti-Mormon Party of Oneida County was a short-lived minor political party in 1870s and 1880s territorial Idaho. The party came to prominence under the leadership of Fred Dubois, a Yale graduate from Illinois, a state that had experienced its own groundswell of anti-Mormonism not 40 years earlier.

== Background ==
The first of several anti-Mormon campaigns in Idaho was sparked by citizens' preference in the Idaho Panhandle, in the state's north and adjacent to Washington, for some kind of boundary reform due to the dominant Democratic Mormon vote in the south. The plan was to create either a new territory combining Washington east of the Cascades and northern Idaho (preferably), to or allow Washington to absorb the panhandle altogether. Southern Idahoans, wishing to keep their state intact, rallied to the anti-Mormon cause by founding a new bipartisan party in 1879 before their combine fell apart the next year.

== Legislation and enforcement ==
With northern Idaho having declared its intention to be annexed by Washington, Republican Dubois revived the Independent Anti-Mormon Party of Oneida County. Due to the GOP's slight majority in the territorial legislature in 1884, he and other Republicans were able to form a large enough anti-Mormon caucus to prevent and enact legislation. That same year, the legislature passed a law banning Mormons from holding office. On Feb. 3, 1885, it was extended to prevent Mormons from voting or serving on juries. (Elements of these laws survived until 1982.) That same May, Dubois conducted a raid of the largely Mormon town of Paris, Idaho to enforce the newly passed Test Oath and sentence polygamous men.

Dubois later wrote of his time as U.S. Marshal: "I became absolutely obsessed with the Mormon problem. The government was determined to stamp out polygamy and I felt I was the agent of the government and the people of the United States, and that the duty devolved upon me to see that the laws of the land were obeyed by the Mormon people in respect to their practices."

Though, Dubois' opposition to polygamy seems to have been born out of convenience: "Those of us who really understood the situation were not nearly so much opposed to polygamy as we were the political domination of the church. We realized however that we could not make those who did not come actually in contact with it understand what this political domination meant. We made use of polygamy in consequence as our great weapon."

== Resistance and decline ==
Mormons did create their own political party for the eight years being, while they were disallowed from politics, in order to combat the statutes. Hostile courts saw to it that their constitutional challenges lost in court, while anti-Mormon Idaho was admitted as the 43rd state to the Union against their wishes in 1890.

While the Church of Jesus Christ of Latter-day Saints twice condemned polygamy with the Manifesto of 1890 and the Second Manifesto, anti-Mormonism took a back seat to new issues like the debate on free silver and increasingly progressive agendas like conservation. Only Fred Dubois himself would try to revive the movement once more in his second tenure as U.S. Senator, this time as a member of the Democratic Party. Caused in no small part by Dubois' obsession with anti-Mormonism and his involvement with the Reed Smoot hearings, he was soundly defeated by Republican attorney William Borah. Democrats in Idaho didn't recover from their electoral losses that year for over a decade.
