= African People's Socialist Party =

Socialist organization in the United States

- Abbreviation: APSP
- Chairman: Omali Yeshitela
- Founded: May 1972; 54 years ago
- Merger of: Junta of Militant Organizations (JOMO); Black Rights Fighters (BRF); Black Study Group (BSG)
- Newspaper: The Burning Spear
- Ideology: Communism; African socialism; African internationalism; Anti-imperialism; Left-wing antiglobalism
- International affiliation: African Socialist International

Party flag

Website
- apspuhuru.org

The African People's Socialist Party (APSP) is a communist, African internationalist political party in the United States. APSP leads a sister organization called the Uhuru Movement (pronounced /ʊhʊrʊ/, Swahili for "freedom"). APSP formed in 1972 from the merger of three prior Black Power organizations. APSP supports reparations for slavery in the United States, communism, and African internationalism, which it says provides a historical materialist explanation for the social and economic conditions of Black people worldwide. APSP organizes protests and runs candidates to shift the capitalist system.

Notable APSP members include Omali Yeshitela, who has been APSP chairman since 1972. In 2024, four leading APSP members, including Yeshitela, were convicted of conspiring to act as unregistered foreign agents of the Russian government but were found not guilty of acting as agents of Russia. They cooperated with Alexander Ionov, head of the Anti-Globalization Movement of Russia. They were sentenced to probation and community service.

== Ideology ==
APSP supports "African Internationalism" and communism. APSP is strongly inspired by Marcus Garvey. APSP's stated goals are "to keep the Black Power Movement alive, defend the countless Africans locked up by the counterinsurgency, and develop relationships with Africa and Africans worldwide". APSP's Constitution defines it as the "advanced detachment of the African working class and its general staff," pursuing the goal of "the liberation and unification of Africa and African people under the leadership of the African working class" and overthrowing imperialism. APSP's platform calls for the release of all African prisoners in US prisons ("concentration camps") and the withdrawal of police forces ("illegitimate standing army") from African American communities.

APSP's African internationalism argues that "capitalism is inherently parasitic", because capitalism could only develop through the enslavement of African people and colonization of Africa, which provided the primitive accumulation necessary to build European imperialism. African internationalists "deny that there has ever been anything progressive about capitalism", in rejection of Karl Marx's view, and argue that "Capitalism is imperialism developed to its highest stage, not the other way around," in rejection of Lenin's view. While often described as a Pan-Africanist party, APSP rejects traditional Pan-Africanism as a "petty bourgeois" ideology and lauds African internationalism as "21st century Garveyism", an ideology for the working class.

== Structure ==
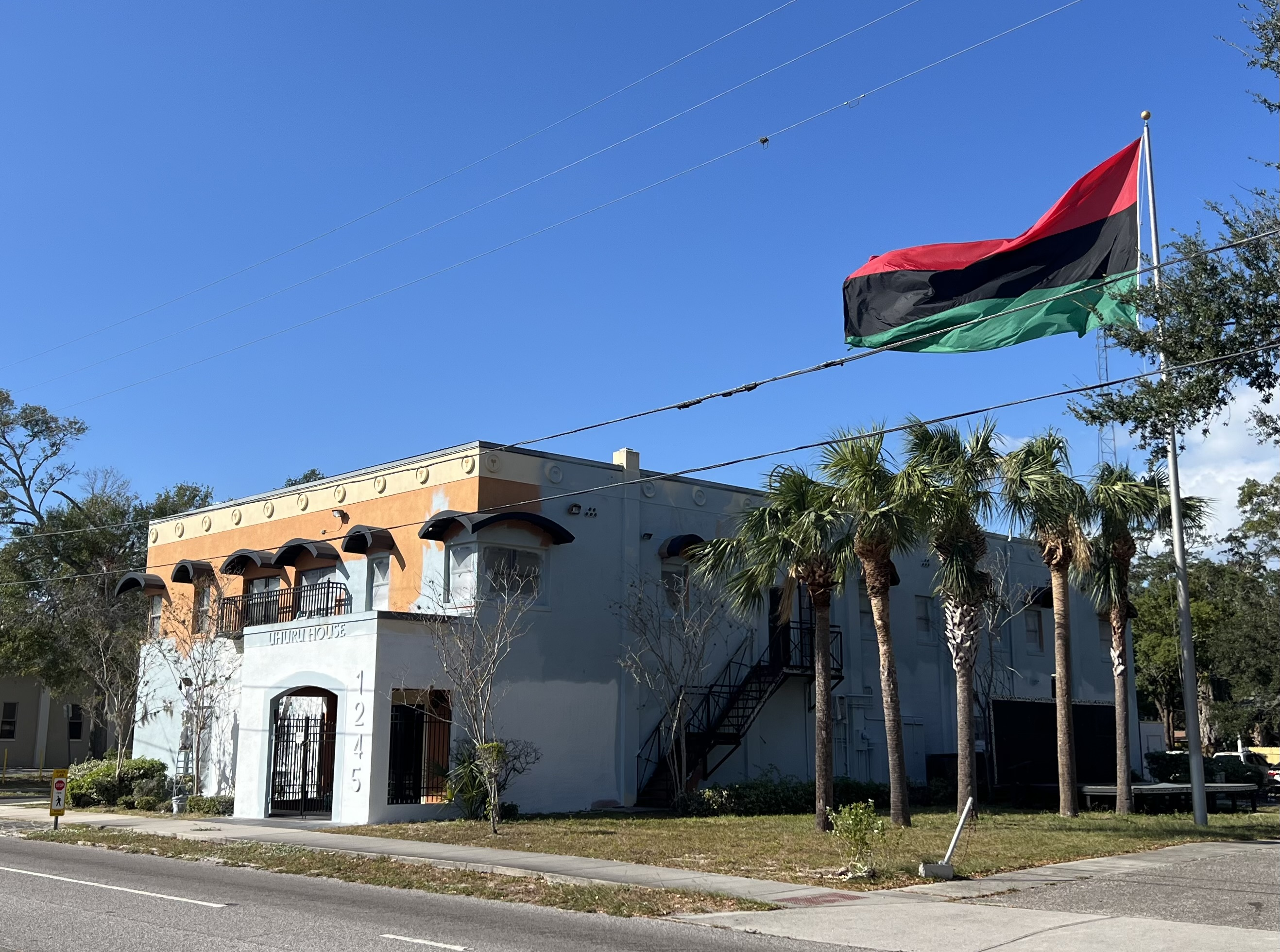
Uhuru House in St. Petersburg, Florida November 13, 2024. Building was being repainted

APSP has created many support organizations, including: The Burning Spear (newspaper, 1968-), Uhuru Movement (1972 - present), African People's Solidarity Committee (APSC, for White supporters, 1979 - present), African National Prison Organization (ANPO, for inmates, 1979 - present), African Socialist International (ASI, international org, 1982 - present), African National Reparations Organization (ANRO, 1982 - present), International People's Democratic Uhuru Movement (InPDUM, 1991 - present), and African National Women's Organization (ANWO, 2015 - present).

The Burning Spear Newspaper is a print and online newspaper, founded in 1968 by Omali Yeshitela as a newspaper for the Junta of Militant Organizations (JOMO). In its organizational pamphlet, JOMO states that the acronym jomo translated means burning spear. The Burning Spear's first issue was printed on December 22, 1969. Since 1972, The Burning Spear has been published by the APSP. The paper has published work by influential Black Power authors, including Assata Shakur.

== History ==
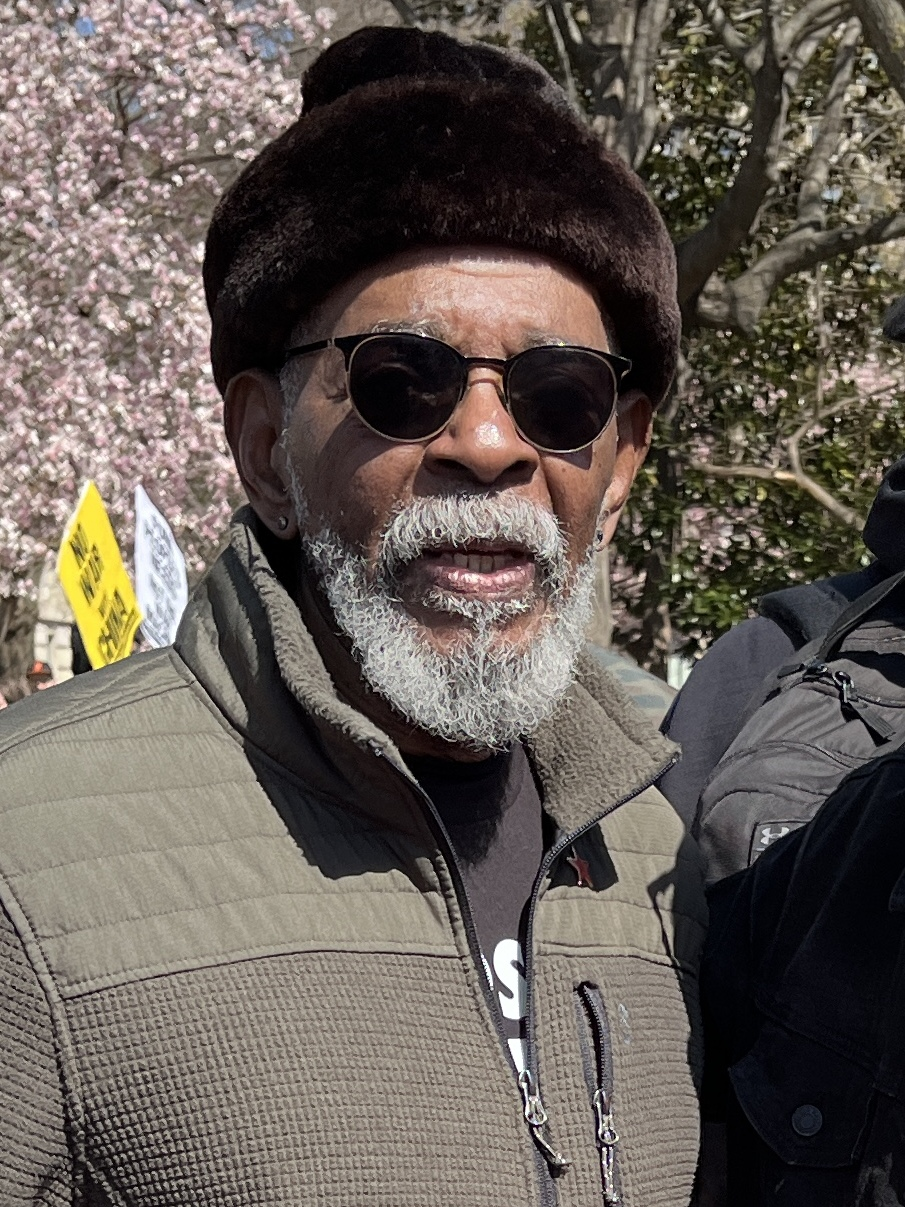
Omali Yeshitela, longtime APSP leader

=== Origins ===
In 1968, Omali Yeshitela created the Junta of Militant Organizations (JOMO), a Black Power organization that protested against racial discrimination, police brutality, and abuses against people of African descent in Florida. JOMO was modelled after the Black Panther Party. Yeshitela gained notice after he tore down a racist mural in St. Petersburg, Florida's City Hall. The wall remains blank today.

In 1972, three Black Power organizations in Florida and Kentucky merged to create APSP: JOMO, the Black Rights Fighters (BRF), and the Black Study Group (BSG). JOMO, chaired by Yeshitela, was the most influential of the three. The Uhuru Movement was also created in 1972. After the merger, Yeshitela became the chairman of APSP and of Uhuru, which shifted their focus from Black Power toward Pan-Africanism.

=== 1970s ===
In 1979, APSP created the African People's Solidarity Committee (APSC), through which White APSP supporters to organize for reparations.

In September 1979, APSP created the African National Prison Organization (ANPO), which had five principles: Self-determination, political independence, anti-imperialism, anti-colonialism, and self-defense. APSP decided to form ANPO after a September 4 meeting with several Black nationalist organizations, which declared need to develop greater unity between Black independence groups and "prison forces".

=== 1980s ===
In 1981, the APSP moved its national office from Florida to Oakland, California, and opened the Uhuru House.

In 1982, APSP held its 1st party Congress. APSP created the African Socialist International (ASI). APSP called for all African socialists to unite into one all-African socialist movement, with the eventual goal of one African state. The ASI seeks to be the "international party of the African working class".

In 1982, APSP created the African National Reparations Organization (ANRO), which held the First World Tribunal on Reparations for African People in Brooklyn, New York. That tribunal concluded that, "the United States owed $4.1 trillion for the crime of genocide against African Americans and the unpaid labor provided by them and their descendants during the period of slavery." The stated objective of the movement is to obtain compensation for the injustices of slavery, as well as segregation and neocolonialism since then. From 1982 to 1994, APSP and ANRO conducted a yearly tribunal on racism in the United States and reparations for stolen labor.

APSP claims that "through this work, the [APSP] gave birth to the modern Reparations Movement." However, Michael Martin and Marilyn Yaquinto argue that the National Black Political Assembly (NBPA)'s Black Agenda report (published 1974) first "endorsed the concept of African American reparations".

=== 1990s ===
In the 1990s, tensions were high between the police in St. Petersburg, Florida and the Uhuru Movement. Members of the Uhuru Movement frequently protested against the police's treatment of African Americans, usually after the murders of African Americans by police. On October 25, 1996, riots in St. Petersburg, Florida erupted after a White police officer shot and killed a young, unarmed Black man driving a stolen car. Cars and buildings were torched and rocks were tossed at the police officers at the scene of the shooting. At least 20 protesters were arrested. The next day, a large group of Uhuru members went back to the scene and called for the release of the arrested protesters. Most of the protests organized by Uhuru remained peaceful. Sobukwe Bambaata, one of the Uhuru members, stated that the rioting would have never occurred "if the police did not come into our community and treat us like dogs".

In the mid-1990s, APSP and the Uhuru House moved back to St. Petersburg, Florida.

=== 2000s ===
In 2004, Uhuru chairman Omali Yeshitela tore down a Halloween display in St. Petersburg, Florida, which depicted "a stuffed figure hung by the neck on a homemade gallows". Subsequent opinions and letters to the St. Petersburg Times criticized both the Uhuru Movement and Yeshitela's conduct.

In 2008, Uhuru received national attention during when Uhuru member Diop Olugbala interrupted presidential candidate Barack Obama at a town hall in St. Petersburg to ask him "What about the black community?" Olugbala argued that Obama was not speaking out for Africans on issues such as police brutality, high unemployment, predatory lending, and Hurricane Katrina.

In 2009, the Anti-Defamation League criticized Uhuru's demonstrations on January 3, 2009, as anti-Israel and anti-Zionist.

In 2009, the International People's Democratic Uhuru Movement (InPDUM) organized a march in support of Lovelle Mixon and against the Oakland Police Department. Mixon was an Oakland, California resident who had killed four Oakland police officers and died during a shootout after a traffic stop, coincidentally just blocks away from the local Uhuru headquarters.

=== 2010s ===
In 2015, at the Johannes Gutenberg University in Mainz, Germany, the General Students' Committee (AStA) broke apart in April 2015 as a consequence of internal dispute over purported antisemitism after having organized an information event about the Uhuru Movement on JGU campus in January. The AStA distanced itself both from the Uhuru Movement, African People's Socialist Party and its leader Omali Yeshitela stating that "the struggle against racism and the consequences of colonialism should not blind us to other reactionary ideologies" and regretted providing a platform to the movement.

=== 2023 federal indictment ===
In 2022, APSP and Uhuru supported Russia's invasion and occupation of eastern Ukraine, which it views as a "defensive war against the world colonial powers" and an appropriate response to NATO expansion. In 2022, APSP and Uhuru members attended an anti-globalization conference in St. Petersburg, Russia.

In 2022, APSP and Uhuru, including chairman Yeshitela, were investigated by state prosecutors for allegedly collaborating with Aleksandr Viktorovich Ionov to spread pro-Russian propaganda and to sow social divisions in the United States. Ionov founded the Anti-Globalization Movement of Russia. US prosecutors described him as a Russian foreign agent under the direction of the Federal Security Service (FSB).

In 2022, on July 29, the Uhuru House in St. Petersburg, Florida, was raided by the FBI due to an indictment by a grand jury alleging a conspiracy between Ionov and the Uhuru movement to spread Russian disinformation under the guise of domestic political movements. An FBI Tampa Special agent said that "The facts and circumstances surrounding this indictment are some of the most egregious and blatant violations we've seen by the Russian government in order to destabilize and undermine trust in American Democracy." APSP described the raids as a "hysterical response to the United States' loss of legitimacy".

In April 2023, the Department of Justice (DOJ) unsealed a federal indictment alleging that APSP and Uhuru worked on behalf of the Russian government without registering as a foreign agent under the Foreign Agents Registration Act (FARA). The Nation described this as the DOJ "using 'foreign agents' accusations to repress Black liberation organizers". In June 2023, Yeshitela interviewed with Amy Goodman of Democracy Now! and dismissed the charges as a baseless attempt by the Biden administration to limit free speech.

In October 2024, four leading members of APSP and Uhuru, including chairman Yeshitela, were convicted in federal court of conspiring to act as unregistered foreign agents of the Russian government. APSP members were found guilty on conspiring with Aleksandr Ionov to interfere in U.S. elections and sow social division in the United States. APSP members were found not guilty of acting as agents of Russia. In December 2024, Yeshitela and two other defendants avoided prison time in the Uhuru-Russian case when District Judge William Jung sentenced them to three years of probation.

== National conventions ==
The table below lists the Plenaries (annual) and Congresses (every 3 years until 2013, then every 5 years) of the APSP.

Name	Date	Location	Attendees	Notes
2026 Plenary	April 17-19, 2026	St. Louis, Missouri		
8th Congress	2023			
2022 Plenary	February 11-14, 2022	virtual		Yeshitela's report
2021 Plenary	February 6–9, 2021	virtual		Yeshitela's report, pts 1, 3, 4
7th Congress	October 6–12, 2018	St. Louis, Missouri	not stated	Yeshitela's report; Articles
2017 Plenary	January 7–9, 2017	St. Petersburg, Florida	"over 100 comrades"	Yeshitela's report
2016 Plenary	January 9–10, 2016	St. Petersburg, Florida	not stated	
2015 Plenary	April 25–26, 2015	St. Petersburg, Florida		Yeshitela's call
6th Congress	December 7–13, 2013	St. Petersburg, Florida		Yeshitela's report; Documents; Constitutional amendments
2012 Plenary	February 18–21, 2012	St. Petersburg, Florida	not stated	Yeshitela's report
5th Congress	July 10-14, 2010	Washington, DC	not stated	Yeshitela's report; Documents; 2010 Constitution
2009 Plenary	July 25–28, 2009			Yeshitela's report
2006 Plenary	July 3–4, 2006	St. Petersburg, Florida	not stated	
1st Congress	September 5–6, 1981	Oakland, California		Yeshitela's report; Party platform

== See also ==
- African nationalism
- African socialism
- Black Power
- Dead Prez
- Political parties in the United States
- Ujamaa
