= Industrial Union Party =

- Abbreviation: IUP
- Founded: 7 July 1933
- Dissolved: 1950
- Split from: SLP
- Succeeded by: LSR
- Headquarters: 1032 Prospect Avenue, Bronx
- Newspaper: Industrial Unionist
- Ideology: De Leonism
- Political position: Left-wing

The Industrial Union Party (IUP) was a US DeLeonist political party. The party proclaimed itself on 7 July 1933 at 1032 Prospect Avenue, Bronx, Branch headquarters of its predecessor Industrial Union League (IUL). The new IUP immediately announced candidates in the New York City elections: Adolph Silver for Mayor, Irving Oring for Comptroller, and Sam Brandon for President of Alderman.

The party's publication, the Industrial Unionist, was published first in May 1932 with its final issue in 1950. Most of the IUP would later reconstitute itself as the League for Socialist Reconstruction.

Noting the roots of IUP in the Socialist Labor Party (SLP), IUP's split from the SLP reflected the impact of the Great Depression and the inability of the SLP to adjust to new events. Yet the immediate roots of the Industrial Union League were in the SLP's mass expulsion of Section Bronx during the 1920s. (Industrial Unionist did not appear until 1932, but its first issue included Louis Lazarowitz' review of Walter H. Senior's The Bankruptcy of Reform, published by the Industrial Union League itself).

In November 1933 a furniture union in Jamestown, New York, the United Workers of America, was founded on industrial unionist principles compatible with the views of the IUP. The union affiliated with the Bronx-based party in December of that year, and soon formed a "mixed trades" local in Erie, Pennsylvania.

== See also ==
- List of political parties in the United States
- Political parties in the United States
