= New Afrikan Black Panther Party =

American far-left political party

- Abbreviation: NABPP
- Chairman: Shaka Zulu
- Founded: April 2005; 21 years ago
- Headquarters: Red Onion State Prison, Wise County, Virginia
- Ideology: Communism; Marxism–Leninism–Maoism; Pantherism; New-Afrikanism; African-American leftism Anti-racism
- Political position: Far-left
- National affiliation: United Panther Movement
- Colors: Black; Blue

The New Afrikan Black Panther Party (NABPP) is a Marxist–Leninist–Maoist organization in the United States, largely based in the Red Onion State Prison in Wise County, Virginia, and referred to as the New Afrikan Black Panther Party – Prison Chapter (NABPP-PC).

== History ==
The party was founded in 2005 by Kevin Rashid Johnson and Shaka Zulu (born Zulu Sharod) also known as Shaka Sankofa Zulu, with support from Native American activist Tom Big Warrior. The party also claims continuity with the Black Panther prison chapter as developed by George Jackson and W. L. Nolen in 1971.

Party leaders were active in the 2016 U.S. prison strike and claimed retribution from prison authorities for their involvement.

Shaka Zulu was released from prison in 2019. Since his release, the NABPP has been organizing "No Prison Fridays" protests in Newark. The NABPP is also organizing "Serve the People" programs to assist communities in developing their own resources and labor power toward restoring them as base areas of cultural, political and economic revolution.

In recent years, the NABPP has built the "United Panther Movement" (UPM) which involves "parallel constellations of activists from all races and genders". The United Panther Movement includes other minor communist parties such as the Red Heart Warrior Society, the White Panther Organization, the Brown Panther Organizing Committee, the New Afrikan Service Organization (formerly The Black Brigade) and the Old South Organizing Committee.

In January 2021, FBI agents interviewed Shaka Zulu on involvement in the Capitol attack; Zulu denied any involvement and considered the interview "harassment."

=== 2020 split ===
In December 2020, supporters of Kevin "Rashid" Johnson split off from NABPP and began using the name Revolutionary Intercommunal Black Panther Party (RIBPP). Johnson cited displeasure with the NABPP leadership, lack of internal democracy, and ideological differences as causing the split.

== Ideology ==
According to the party's founder and current leader, Shaka Zulu, the NABPP's ideology is Pantherism, which is an ideology illuminated by Marxism–Leninism–Maoism. He asserts that Pantherism is "a fighting ideology talking about confiscating the wealth of the super-rich exploiters, the bourgeoisie, through a revolutionary war of liberation". Zulu also stated that Pantherism opposes Black bourgeois nationalism and American reactionary patriotism, with a Maoist world outlook and international proletarian socialism.

The NABPP claims to follow the "class-based ideological line of the original Black Panther Party" while rejecting the "race-based, anti-white" politics of the New Black Panther Party.
