= Lists of office-holders of the United States =

This is a list of leaders and office-holders of United States of America.

== Heads of state and government ==
- Presidents of the United States
- Vice presidents of the United States

== Current and former members of the U.S. Congress ==
- Current United States representatives
- Current United States senators
- Former United States representatives
- Former United States senators

== Judicial officeholders ==
- Chief Justice of the United States
- Justices of the Supreme Court
- United States circuit judges
- United States district judges

== Heads of agencies ==
- Director of the CIA
- Administrators of the United States Environmental Protection Agency
- Ambassadors of the United States to the United Nations

== Heads of states and regional subdivisions ==
- United States governors
- Governors of Alabama
- Governors of Alaska
- Governors of Arizona
- Governors of Arkansas
- Governors of California
- Governors of Colorado
- Governors of Connecticut
- Governors of Delaware
- Governors of Florida
- Governors of Georgia
- Governors of Hawaii
- Governors of Idaho
- Governors of Illinois
- Governors of Indiana
- Governors of Iowa
- Governors of Kansas
- Governors of Kentucky
- Governors of Louisiana
- Governors of Maine
- Governors of Maryland
- Governors of Massachusetts
- Governors of Michigan
- Governors of Minnesota
- Governors of Mississippi
- Governors of Missouri
- Governors of Montana
- Governors of Nebraska
- Governors of Nevada
- Governors of New Hampshire
- Governors of New Jersey
- Governors of New Mexico
- Governors of New York
- Governors of North Carolina
- Governors of North Dakota
- Governors of Ohio
- Governors of Oklahoma
- Governors of Oregon
- Governors of Pennsylvania
- Governors of Rhode Island
- Governors of South Carolina
- Governors of South Dakota
- Governors of Tennessee
- Governors of Texas
- Governors of Utah
- Governors of Vermont
- Governors of Virginia
- Governors of Washington
- Governors of West Virginia
- Governors of Wisconsin
- Governors of Wyoming
- Governors of American Samoa
- Governors of Guam
- Governors of Northern Mariana Islands
- Governors of Puerto Rico
- Governors of U.S. Virgin Islands

== State legislatures ==
- List of U.S. state representatives (Alabama to Missouri)
- List of U.S. state representatives (Montana to Wyoming)
- List of U.S. state senators

== Heads of former states ==
- Monarchs of the Hawaiian Islands
- Royal consorts of the Hawaiian Islands
- Kuhina Nui of the Hawaiian Islands
- Presidents of the Republic of Texas

== See also ==
- Lists of office-holders
- United States order of precedence
