= List of Texas state legislatures =

The legislature of the U.S. state of Texas has convened many times since statehood became effective on December 29, 1845.

== Legislatures ==
Name	Start date	End date	Last election
Texas Constitution of 1845
1st Texas Legislature	February 16, 1846	May 13, 1846	
2nd Texas Legislature	December 13, 1847	March 20, 1848	
3rd Texas Legislature	1849		
4th Texas Legislature	1851		
5th Texas Legislature	1853		
6th Texas Legislature	1855		
7th Texas Legislature	1857		
8th Texas Legislature	1859	1861	
Texas Constitution of 1861
9th Texas Legislature	1861		
10th Texas Legislature	1863		
Texas Constitution of 1866
11th Texas Legislature	1866		
Texas Constitution of 1869
12th Texas Legislature	1870		
13th Texas Legislature	1873		
14th Texas Legislature	1874		
Texas Constitution of 1876
15th Texas Legislature	1876		
16th Texas Legislature	1879		
17th Texas Legislature	1881		
18th Texas Legislature	1883		
19th Texas Legislature	1885		
20th Texas Legislature	1887		
21st Texas Legislature	1889		
22nd Texas Legislature	1891		
23rd Texas Legislature	1893		
24th Texas Legislature	1895		
25th Texas Legislature	1897		
26th Texas Legislature	1899		
27th Texas Legislature	1901		
28th Texas Legislature	1903		
29th Texas Legislature	1905		
30th Texas Legislature	1907		
31st Texas Legislature	1909		
32nd Texas Legislature	1911		
33rd Texas Legislature	1913		
34th Texas Legislature	1915		
35th Texas Legislature	1917		
36th Texas Legislature	1919		
37th Texas Legislature	1921		
38th Texas Legislature	1923		
39th Texas Legislature	1925		
40th Texas Legislature	1927		
41st Texas Legislature	1929		
42nd Texas Legislature	1931		
43rd Texas Legislature	1933		
44th Texas Legislature	1935		
45th Texas Legislature	1937		
46th Texas Legislature	1939		
47th Texas Legislature	1941		
48th Texas Legislature	1942		
49th Texas Legislature	1944		
50th Texas Legislature	1947		
51st Texas Legislature	1949		
52nd Texas Legislature	1951		
53rd Texas Legislature	1953		
54th Texas Legislature	1955		
55th Texas Legislature	1957		
56th Texas Legislature	1959		
57th Texas Legislature	1961		
58th Texas Legislature	1963		
59th Texas Legislature	1965		
60th Texas Legislature	1967		
61st Texas Legislature	1969		
62nd Texas Legislature	1971		
63rd Texas Legislature	1973		
64th Texas Legislature	1975		
65th Texas Legislature	1977		
66th Texas Legislature	1979		
67th Texas Legislature	1981		
68th Texas Legislature	1983		
69th Texas Legislature	1985		
70th Texas Legislature	1987		
71st Texas Legislature	1989		
72nd Texas Legislature	1991		
73rd Texas Legislature	1993		November 1992: House
74th Texas Legislature	1995		November 1994: House
75th Texas Legislature	1997		November 1996: House
76th Texas Legislature	1999		November 1998: House
77th Texas Legislature	2001		November 2000: House
78th Texas Legislature	2003		November 2002: House
79th Texas Legislature	2005		November 2, 2004: House, Senate
80th Texas Legislature	2007		November 7, 2006: House, Senate
81st Texas Legislature	2009	2009	November 4, 2008: House, Senate
82nd Texas Legislature	2011	2011	November 2, 2010: House, Senate
83rd Texas Legislature	2013	2013	November 6, 2012: House, Senate
84th Texas Legislature	2015	2015	November 4, 2014: House, Senate
85th Texas Legislature	2017	2017	November 8, 2016: House, Senate
86th Texas Legislature	2019	2019	November 6, 2018: House, Senate
87th Texas Legislature	January 12, 2021	2021	November 3, 2020: House, Senate
88th Texas Legislature	January 10, 2023	2023	November 8, 2022: House, Senate
89th Texas Legislature	2025		November 5, 2024: House, Senate

== See also ==
- List of speakers of the Texas House of Representatives
- List of presidents pro tempore of the Texas Senate
- List of governors of Texas
- Politics of Texas
- Elections in Texas
- Texas State Capitol
- Historical outline of Texas
- Lists of United States state legislative sessions
