= List of U.S. state legislatures =

This is a list of United States state legislatures. Each state in the United States has a legislature as part of its form of civil government. Most of the fundamental details of the legislature are specified in the state constitution. With the exception of Nebraska, all state legislatures are bicameral bodies, composed of a lower house (Assembly, General Assembly, State Assembly, House of Delegates, or House of Representatives) and an upper house (Senate). The United States also has one federal district and five non-state territories with local legislative branches, which are listed below. Among the states, the Nebraska Legislature is the only state with a unicameral body. However, three other jurisdictions – the District of Columbia, Guam, and the U.S. Virgin Islands – also have unicameral bodies.

The exact names, dates, term lengths, term limits, electoral systems, electoral districts, and other details are determined by an individual state's laws.

== Party summary ==
Party control of legislatures
Republican	28
Democratic	18
Split (Note: "Split" in the sense that each of the two chambers are controlled by a different party (e.g., a Democratic Senate and Republican House) or one chamber is evenly split between parties and thus "hung". The Nebraska Legislature is nonpartisan, and although the majority of members are registered members of the Republican Party, Nebraska's lack of formal party structure within its rules means that no single political party controls the Nebraska Legislature to the extent that political parties often control legislative bodies in other U.S. states. However, for the general purposes of this information, understanding the Nebraska Legislature to be Republican-controlled is a merited oversimplification.)	4
Total	50

Party control of state governments
Republican trifecta	23
Democratic trifecta	16
Democratic governor/Republican legislature	5
Republican governor/Democratic legislature	2
Democratic governor/Split legislature	3
Republican governor/Split legislature	1
Total	50

Note: A party with a numerical majority in a chamber may be forced to share power with other parties due to informal coalitions or may cede power outright because of divisions within its caucus.

U.S. state and territory governments (governor and legislature) by party control Democratic control Republican control NPP control Split control

U.S. state and territorial legislatures by party control Democratic control Republican control NPP control Split control

== State legislatures ==
State	State executive	Legislature name	Lower house				Upper house			
State	State executive	Legislature name	Name	Size	Party strength	Term (yrs.)	Name	Size	Party strength	Term (yrs.)
Alabama	Governor	Legislature	House of Representatives	105	R 76–29	4	Senate	35	R 27–8	4
Alaska	Governor	Legislature	House of Representatives	40	MC 21–19 (Note: The majority in the Alaska House of Representatives is held by a coalition of 14 Democrats, 2 Republicans and 5 Independents. The minority consists of 19 Republicans.)	2	Senate	20	MC 14–6 (Note: The majority in the Alaska Senate is held by a coalition of 9 Democrats and 5 Republicans. There are 6 Republicans outside the caucus.)	4
Arizona	Governor	State Legislature	House of Representatives	60	R 33–27	2	Senate	30	R 17–13	2
Arkansas	Governor	General Assembly	House of Representatives	100	R 80–20	2	Senate	35	R 29–6	4
California	Governor	State Legislature (Note: The Constitution of California names it the "California Legislature", but the legislature brands itself as the "California State Legislature".)	State Assembly	80	D 60–20	2	State Senate	40	D 30–10	4
Colorado	Governor	General Assembly	House of Representatives	65	D 43–22	2	Senate	35	D 23–12	4
Connecticut	Governor	General Assembly	House of Representatives	151	D 102–49	2	State Senate	36	D 25–11	2
Delaware	Governor	General Assembly	House of Representatives	41	D 27–14	2	Senate	21	D 15–6	4
Florida	Governor	Legislature	House of Representatives	120	R 86–34	2	Senate	40	R 27–12, 1 ind.	4
Georgia	Governor	General Assembly	House of Representatives	180	R 99–81	2	State Senate	56	R 33–23	2
Hawaii	Governor	Legislature	House of Representatives	51	D 41–10	2	Senate	25	D 22–3	4
Idaho	Governor	Legislature	House of Representatives	70	R 61–9	2	Senate	35	R 29–6	2
Illinois	Governor	General Assembly	House of Representatives	118	D 78–40	2	Senate	59	D 40–19	2 or 4
Indiana	Governor	General Assembly	House of Representatives	100	R 69–30, 1 ind.	2	Senate	50	R 40–10	4
Iowa	Governor	General Assembly	House of Representatives	100	R 67–33	2	Senate	50	R 33–17	4
Kansas	Governor	Legislature	House of Representatives	125	R 88–37	2	Senate	40	R 31–9	4
Kentucky	Governor	General Assembly	House of Representatives	100	R 80–20	2	Senate	38	R 32–6	4
Louisiana	Governor	Legislature (Note: The Constitution of Louisiana vests legislative authority in "a legislature, consisting of a Senate and a House of Representatives," and refers to it as "the legislature" throughout, without officially designating a term for the two houses together. However, the two bodies do use the term "Louisiana State Legislature" in official references to itself.)	House of Representatives	105	R 73–32	4	State Senate	39	R 28–11	4
Maine	Governor	Legislature	House of Representatives	151	D 75–73, 3 ind. (Note: There are three additional non-voting seats allocated to sovereign tribal nations within Maine. As of 2026, two seats of the three tribal seats are filled; the two current tribal representatives are non-partisan/independent but are not counted in this total.)	2	Senate	35	D 20–14, 1 ind.	2
Maryland	Governor	General Assembly	House of Delegates	141	D 102–39	4	Senate	47	D 34–13	4
Massachusetts	Governor	General Court	House of Representatives	160	D 134–25, 1 ind.	2	Senate	40	D 35–5	2
Michigan	Governor	Legislature	House of Representatives	110	R 58–52	2	Senate	38	D 20–18	4
Minnesota	Governor	Legislature	House of Representatives	134	DFL 67–66	2	Senate	67	DFL 34–33	2, 4, 4
Mississippi	Governor	Legislature	House of Representatives	122	R 78–42, 2 ind.	4	State Senate	52	R 34–18	4
Missouri	Governor	General Assembly	House of Representatives	163	R 111–52	2	Senate	34	R 24–10	4
Montana	Governor	Legislature	House of Representatives	100	R 58–42	2	Senate	50	R 32–18	4
Nebraska	Governor	Legislature	(Unicameral)				Legislature (Note: When Nebraska switched to a unicameral legislature in 1937, the lower house was abolished. All current Nebraskan legislators are referred to as "Senators", as the pre-1937 senate was the retained house.)	49	R 33–15, 1 ind. (Note: Nebraska's legislature is de jure nonpartisan but senators' political affiliations are publicly known and voting often happens along party lines; the de facto composition is given here.)	4
Nevada	Governor	Legislature	Assembly	42	D 27–15	2	Senate	21	D 13–8	4
New Hampshire	Governor	General Court	House of Representatives	400	R 220–179, 1 ind.	2	Senate	24	R 16–8	2
New Jersey	Governor	Legislature	General Assembly	80	D 57–23	2	Senate	40	D 25–15	2, 4, 4
New Mexico	Governor	Legislature	House of Representatives	70	D 44–26	2	Senate	42	D 26–16	4
New York	Governor	State Legislature	State Assembly	150	D 103–47	2	State Senate	63	D 41–22	2
North Carolina	Governor	General Assembly	House of Representatives	120	R 71–47, 2 ind.	2	Senate	50	R 30–20	2
North Dakota	Governor	Legislative Assembly	House of Representatives	94	R 83–11	4	Senate	47	R 42–5	4
Ohio	Governor	General Assembly	House of Representatives	99	R 65–34	2	Senate	33	R 24–9	4
Oklahoma	Governor	Legislature	House of Representatives	101	R 81–20	2	Senate	48	R 40–8	4
Oregon	Governor	Legislative Assembly	House of Representatives	60	D 37–23	2	State Senate	30	D 18–12	4
Pennsylvania	Governor	General Assembly	House of Representatives	203	D 103–100	2	State Senate	50	R 27–23	4
Rhode Island	Governor	General Assembly	House of Representatives	75	D 64–10, 1 ind.	2	Senate	38	D 34–4	2
South Carolina	Governor	General Assembly	House of Representatives	124	R 89–35	2	Senate	46	R 34–12	4
South Dakota	Governor	Legislature	House of Representatives	70	R 65–5	2	Senate	35	R 32–3	2
Tennessee	Governor	General Assembly	House of Representatives	99	R 75–24	2	Senate	33	R 27–6	4
Texas	Governor	Legislature	House of Representatives	150	R 88–62	2	Senate	31	R 19–12	4
Utah	Governor	State Legislature (Note: The Constitution of Utah names it the "Legislature of the State of Utah", but the legislature brands itself as the "Utah State Legislature".)	House of Representatives	75	R 61–14	2	State Senate	29	R 22–6, 1 FWD (Note: One senator is registered with the Forward Party.)	4
Vermont	Governor	General Assembly	House of Representatives	150	MC 94–56 (Note: The majority in the Vermont House of Representatives is held by a coalition of 87 Democrats, 3 Vermont Progressives and 4 independents. The minority consists of 56 Republicans.)	2	Senate	30	MC 17–13 (Note: The majority in the Vermont Senate is held by a coalition of 16 Democrats and 1 Vermont Progressive. 13 Republicans make up the minority.)	2
Virginia	Governor	General Assembly	House of Delegates	100	D 64–36	2	Senate	40	D 21–19	4
Washington	Governor	State Legislature (Note: The Constitution of Washington names it "the legislature of the state of Washington", but the legislature brands itself as the "Washington State Legislature".)	House of Representatives	98	D 59–39	2	State Senate	49	D 30–19	4
West Virginia	Governor	Legislature	House of Delegates	100	R 91–9	2	Senate	34	R 32–2	4
Wisconsin	Governor	State Legislature	State Assembly	99	R 54–45	2	Senate	33	R 18–15	4
Wyoming	Governor	Legislature	House of Representatives	62	R 56–6	2	Senate	31	R 29–2	4

=== Current legislatures ===
State	Session/term	Last elections	
State	Session/term	Lower house	Senate
Alabama	2022–2026 Alabama Legislature	November 8, 2022 (House)	November 8, 2022 (Senate)
Alaska	34th Alaska State Legislature	November 5, 2024 (House)	November 5, 2024 (Senate)
Arizona	57th Arizona State Legislature	November 5, 2024 (House)	November 5, 2024 (Senate)
Arkansas	95th Arkansas General Assembly	November 5, 2024 (House)	November 5, 2024 (Senate)
California	California State Legislature, 2025–26 session	November 5, 2024 (Assembly)	November 5, 2024 (Senate)
Colorado	75th Colorado General Assembly	November 5, 2024 (House)	November 5, 2024 (Senate)
Connecticut	Connecticut General Assembly, Session Year 2025	November 5, 2024 (House)	November 5, 2024 (Senate)
Delaware	153rd Delaware General Assembly	November 5, 2024 (House)	November 5, 2024 (Senate)
Florida	27th Florida Legislature	November 5, 2024 (House)	November 5, 2024 (Senate)
Georgia	158th Georgia General Assembly	November 5, 2024 (House)	November 5, 2024 (Senate)
Hawaii	33rd Hawaii State Legislature	November 5, 2024 (House)	November 5, 2024 (Senate)
Idaho	70th Idaho Legislature	November 5, 2024 (House)	November 5, 2024 (Senate)
Illinois	104th Illinois General Assembly	November 5, 2024 (House)	November 5, 2024 (Senate)
Indiana	124th Indiana General Assembly	November 5, 2024 (House)	November 5, 2024 (Senate)
Iowa	91st Iowa General Assembly	November 5, 2024 (House)	November 5, 2024 (Senate)
Kansas	2025-2026 Kansas Legislature	November 5, 2024 (House)	November 5, 2024 (Senate)
Kentucky	2025 Kentucky General Assembly	November 5, 2024 (House)	November 5, 2024 (Senate)
Louisiana	72nd Louisiana Legislature	October 14 and November 18, 2023 (House)	October 14 and November 18, 2023 (Senate)
Maine	132nd Maine Legislature	November 5, 2024 (House)	November 5, 2024 (Senate)
Maryland	447th Maryland General Assembly	November 8, 2022 (House)	November 8, 2022 (Senate)
Massachusetts	2025–2026 Massachusetts legislature	November 5, 2024 (House)	November 5, 2024 (Senate)
Michigan	103rd Michigan Legislature	November 5, 2024 (House)	November 8, 2022 (Senate)
Minnesota	94th Minnesota Legislature	November 5, 2024 (House)	November 8, 2022 (Senate)
Mississippi	2024–2028 Mississippi Legislature	November 7, 2023 (House)	November 7, 2023 (Senate)
Missouri	103rd Missouri General Assembly	November 5, 2024 (House)	November 5, 2024 (Senate)
Montana	69th Montana Legislature	November 5, 2024 (House)	November 5, 2024 (Senate)
Nebraska	109th Nebraska Legislature	November 5, 2024	
Nevada	83rd Nevada Legislature	November 5, 2024 (Assembly)	November 5, 2024 (Senate)
New Hampshire	2025–2026 New Hampshire General Court	November 5, 2024 (House)	November 5, 2024 (Senate)
New Jersey	222nd New Jersey Legislature	November 4, 2025 (Assembly)	November 7, 2023 (Senate)
New Mexico	57th New Mexico Legislature	November 5, 2024 (House)	November 5, 2024 (Senate)
New York	206th New York State Legislature	November 5, 2024 (Assembly)	November 5, 2024 (Senate)
North Carolina	North Carolina General Assembly of 2025–26	November 5, 2024 (House)	November 5, 2024 (Senate)
North Dakota	69th North Dakota Legislative Assembly	November 5, 2024 (House)	November 5, 2024 (Senate)
Ohio	136th Ohio General Assembly	November 5, 2024 (House)	November 5, 2024 (Senate)
Oklahoma	60th Oklahoma Legislature	November 5, 2024 (House)	November 5, 2024 (Senate)
Oregon	83rd Oregon Legislative Assembly	November 5, 2024 (House)	November 5, 2024 (Senate)
Pennsylvania	2025–2026 Pennsylvania legislature	November 5, 2024 (House)	November 5, 2024 (Senate)
Rhode Island	2025–2026 Rhode Island General Assembly	November 5, 2024 (House)	November 5, 2024 (Senate)
South Carolina	126th South Carolina General Assembly	November 5, 2024 (House)	November 5, 2024 (Senate)
South Dakota	100th South Dakota Legislature	November 5, 2024 (House)	November 5, 2024 (Senate)
Tennessee	114th Tennessee General Assembly	November 5, 2024 (House)	November 5, 2024 (Senate)
Texas	89th Texas Legislature	November 5, 2024 (House)	November 5, 2024 (Senate)
Utah	66th Utah State Legislature	November 5, 2024 (House)	November 5, 2024 (Senate)
Vermont	2025–2026 Vermont General Assembly	November 5, 2024 (House)	November 5, 2024 (Senate)
Virginia	164th Virginia General Assembly	November 7, 2023 (House)	November 7, 2023 (Senate)
Washington	69th Washington State Legislature	November 5, 2024 (House)	November 5, 2024 (Senate)
West Virginia	87th West Virginia Legislature	November 5, 2024 (House)	November 5, 2024 (Senate)
Wisconsin	107th Wisconsin Legislature	November 5, 2024 (Assembly)	November 5, 2024 (Senate)
Wyoming	68th Wyoming State Legislature	November 5, 2024 (House)	November 5, 2024 (Senate)

=== Lists of past terms/sessions ===
State/Territory	List	First session
States
Alabama	List of Alabama state legislatures	1819
Alaska	List of Alaska State Legislatures	1959
Arizona	List of Arizona state legislatures	1912
Arkansas	List of Arkansas General Assemblies	1836
California	List of California state legislatures	1849
Colorado	List of Colorado legislatures	1876
Connecticut		
Delaware	List of Delaware General Assembly sessions	1776
Florida	List of Florida state legislatures	1845
Georgia	List of Georgia state legislatures	1777
Hawaii	List of Hawaii state legislatures	1959
Idaho	List of Idaho state legislatures	1890
Illinois	List of Illinois state legislatures	1818
Indiana	List of Indiana General Assemblies	1816
Iowa	List of Iowa General Assemblies	1846
Kansas	List of Kansas state legislatures	1861
Kentucky	List of Kentucky General Assemblies	
Louisiana	List of Louisiana state legislatures	1812
Maine	List of Maine state legislatures	1820
Maryland	List of Maryland General Assemblies	
Massachusetts	List of Massachusetts General Courts	1780
Michigan	List of Michigan state legislatures	1835
Minnesota	List of Minnesota state legislatures	1857
Mississippi	List of Mississippi state legislatures	1817
Missouri	List of Missouri General Assemblies	1820
Montana	List of Montana state legislatures	1889
Nebraska	List of Nebraska state legislatures	1866
Nevada	List of Nevada state legislatures	1864
New Hampshire	List of New Hampshire General Courts	
New Jersey	List of New Jersey state legislatures	1776
New Mexico	List of New Mexico state legislatures	1912
New York	List of New York State legislatures	1777
North Carolina	List of North Carolina state legislatures	1777
North Dakota	List of North Dakota Legislative Assemblies	1889
Ohio	List of Ohio state legislatures	1803
Oklahoma	List of Oklahoma state legislatures	1907
Oregon	List of Oregon Legislative Assemblies	1860
Pennsylvania	List of Pennsylvania state legislatures	1776
Rhode Island	List of Rhode Island General Assemblies	
South Carolina	List of South Carolina state legislatures	
South Dakota	List of South Dakota state legislatures	1889
Tennessee	List of Tennessee General Assemblies	1794
Texas	List of Texas state legislatures	1846
Utah	List of Utah state legislatures	1896
Vermont	List of Vermont General Assemblies	
Virginia	List of Virginia state legislatures	1776
Washington	List of Washington state legislatures	1889
West Virginia	List of West Virginia state legislatures	1863
Wisconsin	List of Wisconsin state legislatures	1848
Wyoming	List of Wyoming state legislatures	1890
Territories
American Samoa	List of American Samoa Fono	1948
Puerto Rico	List of Legislative Assemblies of Puerto Rico	1949
Virgin Islands	List of Virgin Islands Legislatures	1955

== Federal district and territorial legislatures ==
Federal district or territory	Governor	Name	Lower house				Upper house			
Federal district or territory	Governor	Name	Name	Size	Party strength	Term (yrs)	Name	Size	Party strength	Term (yrs)
American Samoa	Governor	Fono	House of Representatives	21	NP 21 (Note: The American Samoa House of Representatives also includes one nonpartisan delegate representing Swains Island; this seat was non-voting until 2025.)	2	Senate	18	NP 18	4
District of Columbia	Mayor	Council	(Unicameral)				Council	13	D 11–0, 2 ind.	4
Guam	Governor	Legislature	(Unicameral)				Legislature	15	R 9–6	2
Northern Mariana Islands	Governor	Commonwealth Legislature	House of Representatives	20	Coal. 16–4 (Note: The majority in the Northern Mariana Islands House of Representatives is held by a coalition of 4 Democrats and 12 independents. The minority consists of 3 Republicans and 1 Independent.)	2	Senate	9	Coal. 7–2 (Note: The majority in the Northern Mariana Islands Senate is held by a coalition of 3 independents and 4 Republicans. The minority consists of 2 Democrats.)	4
Puerto Rico	Governor	Legislative Assembly	House of Representatives	51	36 PNP, 13 PPD, 3 PIP, 1 PD	4	Senate	27	19 PNP, 5 PPD, 2 PIP, 1 PD, 1 ind. (Note: The parties of Puerto Rico are separate from the Republican and Democratic parties.)	4
United States Virgin Islands	Governor	Legislature	(Unicameral)				Legislature	15	D 11–0, 4 ind.	2

=== Current legislatures ===
State	Session	Last Election
Puerto Rico	20th Legislative Assembly of Puerto Rico	5 November 2024 (House); 5 November 2024 (Senate)
Northern Mariana Islands	24th Northern Mariana Islands Legislature	5 November 2024 (House); 5 November 2024 (Senate)
District of Columbia		5 November 2024
American Samoa	38th American Samoa Fono	November 5, 2024 (House); November 5, 2024 (Senate)
U.S. Virgin Islands	36th Virgin Islands Legislature	5 November 2024

== Tables ==
These are the latest tables from the National Conference of State Legislatures.

=== States ===
Abbreviations: vacancy, undecided, recall, Covenant Party, New Progressive Party, Popular Democratic Party.

2027 state and legislative partisan composition. As of November 21, 2026 (pending recounts and some races uncalled). National Conference of State Legislatures.
State	Total seats	Total Senate	Senate Dem.	Senate Rep.	Senate other	Total House	House Dem.	House Rep.	House other	Leg. control	Gov. party	State control
Alabama	140	35	10	24	1 ind	105	31	74		Rep	Rep	Rep
Alaska	60	20	8	11	1 other	40	17	16	7 nonpartisan	Coal.	Dem	Divided
Arizona	90	30	20	10		60	37	23		Dem	Dem	Dem
Arkansas	135	35	7	28		100	30	70		Rep	Rep	Rep
California	120	40	32	8		80	68	12		Dem	Dem	Dem
Colorado	100	35	24	11		65	49	16		Dem	Dem	Dem
Connecticut	187	36	33	3		151	116	35		Dem	Dem	Dem
Delaware	62	21	15	6		41	30	11		Dem	Dem	Dem
Florida	160	40	13	26	1 ind	120	50	70		Rep	Rep	Rep
Georgia	236	56	27	29		180	91	88	1 runoff	Divided	Dem	Divided
Hawaii	76	25	22	3		51	44	6	1 green	Dem	Dem	Dem
Idaho	105	35	7	28		70	14	56		Rep	Rep	Rep
Illinois	177	59	45	14		118	84	34		Dem	Dem	Dem
Indiana	150	50	15	35		100	46	54		Rep	Rep	Rep
Iowa	150	50	18	32		100	44	56		Rep	Dem	Divided
Kansas	165	40	9	31		125	57	68		Rep	Dem	Divided
Kentucky	138	38	8	30		100	26	74		Rep	Dem	Divided
Louisiana	144	39	10	28	1v	105	32	70	3v	Rep	Rep	Rep
Maine	186	35	24	11		151	87	61	3 ind	Dem	Dem	Dem
Maryland	188	47	35	12		141	106	35		Dem	Dem	Dem
Massachusetts	200	40	35	5		160	138	21	1 ind	Dem	Dem	Dem
Michigan	148	38	23	15		110	63	47		Dem	Dem	Dem
Minnesota	201	67	39	28		134	77	57		Dem	Dem	Dem
Mississippi	174	52	17	34	1v	122	41	77	2 ind, 2v	Rep	Rep	Rep
Missouri	197	34	12	22		163	68	95		Rep	Rep	Rep
Montana	150	50	20	30		100	44	56		Rep	Rep	Rep
Nebraska	49	49	17	30	2 ind	Unicameral - nonpartisan				Nonpartisan	Rep	N/A
Nevada	63	21	13	8		42	32	10		Dem	Dem	Dem
New Hampshire	424	24	15	9		400	293	106	1 ind	Dem	Rep	Divided
New Jersey	120	40	25	15		80	57	23		Dem	Dem	Dem
New Mexico	112	42	26	16		70	47	23		Dem	Dem	Dem
New York	213	63	48	15		150	111	39		Dem	Dem	Dem
North Carolina	170	50	24	26		120	71	48	1 ind	Divided	Dem	Divided
North Dakota	141	47	6	41		94	14	80		Rep	Rep	Rep
Ohio	132	33	11	22		99	44	55		Rep	Dem	Divided
Oklahoma	149	48	8	40		101	26	75		Rep	Rep	Rep
Oregon	90	30	19	11		60	39	21		Dem	Dem	Dem
Pennsylvania	253	50	26	24		203	114	89		Dem	Dem	Dem
Rhode Island	113	38	36	2		75	66	8	1 ind	Dem	Dem	Dem
South Carolina	170	46	12	34		124	45	79		Rep	Rep	Rep
South Dakota	105	35	2	33		70	10	59	1 ind	Rep	Rep	Rep
Tennessee	132	33	6	27		99	29	69	1 ind	Rep	Rep	Rep
Texas	181	31	12	19		150	83	67		Divided	Dem	Divided
Utah	104	29	8	21		75	28	45	2 ind	Rep	Rep	Rep
Vermont	180	30	20	8	1 ind, 1 Prog	150	102	38	3 ind, 7 Prog	Dem	Rep	Divided
Virginia	140	40	21	19		100	63	36	1v	Dem	Dem	Dem
Washington	147	49	30	19		98	69	29		Dem	Dem	Dem
West Virginia	134	34	4	30		100	21	79		Rep	Rep	Rep
Wisconsin	132	33	18	15		99	53	46		Dem	Dem	Dem
Wyoming	93	31	2	29		62	7	55		Rep	Rep	Rep
Total States	7386	1973	937	1027	9 other	5413	2914	2461	38 other	21R, 24D, 1 Coal., 1 nonpartisan, 3 Div.	20R,30D	17R, 22D, 1 N/A, 10 Div.

=== U.S. territories ===
Abbreviations: vacancy, undecided, recall, Covenant Party, New Progressive Party, Popular Democratic Party.

U.S. territories and legislative partisan composition. As of August 2, 2024. National Conference of State Legislatures.
U.S. territories	Total seats	Total Senate	Senate Dem.	Senate Rep.	Senate other	Total House	House Dem.	House Rep.	House other	Leg. control	Gov. party	Ter. control
American Samoa	39	18	Non-partisan		18	21	Non-partisan		21		Dem	
District of Columbia	13	13	11		2	Unicameral				Dem	N/A	Dem
Guam	15	15	9	6		Unicameral					Dem	
Mariana Islands	29	9	2	4	3	20	4	3	13	Divided	Ind	Divided
Puerto Rico	78	27	12 DPP	10 NPP	5	51	25 DPP	21 NPP	5	DPP	NPP	Divided
Virgin Islands	15	15			15	Unicameral - nonpartisan				Dem	Dem	Dem

== See also ==
- State legislature (United States)
- Female state legislators in the United States
- Political party strength in U.S. states
- Comparison of U.S. state governments
- United States state legislatures' partisan trend
- National Conference of State Legislatures
- List of current legislatures
- List of current United States governors
- List of U.S. state representatives (Alabama to Missouri)
- List of U.S. state representatives (Montana to Wyoming)
- List of U.S. state senators
