= State legislature (United States) =

Legislature of a U.S. state

US state and territorial legislatures by party control Democratic control Republican control PNP control Split control

US state and territorial governments (governor and legislature) by party control Democratic control Republican control PNP control Split control

In the United States, the state legislature is the legislative branch in each of the 50 U.S. states.

A legislature generally performs state duties for a state in the same way that the United States Congress performs national duties at the national level. Generally, the same system of checks and balances that exists at the federal level also exists between the state legislature, the state executive officer (governor) and the state judiciary.

In 27 states, the legislature is called the legislature or the state legislature, while in 19 states the legislature is called the general assembly. In Massachusetts and New Hampshire, the legislature is called the general court, while North Dakota and Oregon designate the legislature the legislative assembly.

== Legislature overview ==
=== Responsibilities ===
The responsibilities of a state legislature vary from state to state, depending on state's constitution.

The primary function of any legislature is to create laws. State legislatures also approve budgets for state governments. They may establish government agencies, set policies, and approve budgets. For instance, a state legislature could establish an agency to manage environmental conservation efforts within that state. In some states, state legislators elect other officials.

State legislatures often have power to regulate businesses operating within their jurisdiction. They also regulate courts within their jurisdiction. This includes determining the types of cases that can be heard, setting court fees, and regulating attorney conduct.

Other responsibilities

Under the terms of Article V of the U.S. Constitution, state lawmakers retain the power to ratify Constitutional amendments which have been proposed by both houses of Congress, and they also retain the ability to call for a national convention to propose amendments to the U.S. Constitution.

Proposed constitutional amendments become part of the U.S. Constitution when three-quarters of the states ratify what the amendment. Under Article II, state legislatures choose the manner of appointing the state's presidential electors. Formerly, some state legislatures appointed the U.S. Senators from their respective states, until the ratification of the 17th Amendment in 1913 required the direct election of senators by the state's voters.

Sometimes what the legislature wishes to accomplish cannot be done simply by the passage of a bill, but, rather, requires amending the state constitution. Each state has specified steps intended to make it difficult to alter the constitution without the sufficient support of either the legislature, people, or both.

=== Organization ===
All states except Nebraska have a bicameral legislature. The smaller chamber is called the senate, usually referred to as the upper house. This chamber usually has the exclusive power to confirm appointments made by the governor and try articles of impeachment. (In a few states, a separate executive council, composed of members elected from large districts, performs the confirmation function.)

Nebraska originally had a bicameral legislature like the other states, but the lower house was abolished following a referendum, effective with the 1936 elections. The remaining unicameral (one-chamber) legislature is called the Nebraska Legislature, but its members are called state senators.

During the 20th century, state legislatures further emulated the activities and structures of the U.S. Congress, as institutions at both levels grew in size and complexity, often accompanied by increases in both staffing and member pay. While most state legislatures remain part-time institutions, a handful of states have expanded theirs to meet year-round.

==== History ====
The first bicameral American legislature was formed in 1619 as the Virginia House of Burgesses. The early colonial assemblies were not rooted in English models of parliament. The early colonial assemblies also varied among each other in terms of structure and organization.

The legislatures of the initial Thirteen Colonies usually consisted of an elected lower house and appointed upper house, the latter of which also functioned as an advisory council to the colonial governor. After the American Revolution and establishment of the United States, most states wrote new constitutions, which had direct elections for both chambers of the legislature. This new model helped influence the U.S. Constitution, and was then adopted by new states which later joined the union.

==== Representation ====
Members of the smaller chamber represent more citizens and usually serve for longer terms than those of the larger chamber, generally four years. In 41 states, the larger chamber is called the House of Representatives. Five states designate the larger chamber the Assembly, three states call it the House of Delegates, and one has just one chamber. Members of the larger chamber usually serve for terms of two years. The larger chamber customarily has the exclusive power to initiate taxing legislation and articles of impeachment.

Prior to the United States Supreme Court decisions Baker v. Carr (1962) and Reynolds v. Sims (1964), the basis of representation in most state legislatures was modeled on that of the U.S. Congress: the state senators represented geographical units, while members of the larger chamber represented population. In Reynolds v. Sims, the Supreme Court decided upon the one man, one vote standard for state legislatures and invalidated representation based on geographical units regardless of population. (The ruling does not affect the U.S. Senate, because that chamber's makeup is prescribed by the U.S. Constitution.)

=== Sessions ===
During a legislative session, the legislature considers matters introduced by its members or submitted by the governor. Businesses and other special interest organizations often lobby the legislature to obtain beneficial legislation, defeat unfavorably perceived measures, or influence other legislative action. A legislature also approves the state's operating and capital budgets, which may begin as a legislative proposal or submission by the governor.

In most states, a new state legislature convenes in January of the odd-numbered year after the election of members to the larger chamber. The period during which the legislature remains in session varies by state. In states where the legislature is considered part-time, a session may last several months; where the legislature is considered full-time, the session may last all year, with periodic breaks for district work.

Some states have varying lengths for odd and even-numbered years, or allow for fixed numbers of either legislative or calendar days. Georgia for example, allows only 40 legislative days per year, and Wyoming allows 60 legislative days per term, and no more than 40 per calendar year, whereas in Michigan, New Jersey, New York (in odd-numbered years), Ohio, Pennsylvania and Wisconsin (in odd-numbered years), the sessions usually last all year.

Four state legislatures – Montana, Nevada, North Dakota and Texas – meet only biennially. In the early 1960s, only 19 legislatures met annually, but by the mid-1970s, it had increased to 41. The latest legislature to switch to annual sessions was Oregon in 2011, following a voter-approved ballot measure.

Many state legislators meet every year at the National Conference of The Council of State Governments (CSG), headquartered in Lexington, Kentucky, with offices in Washington, DC, New York City, Chicago, Atlanta, and Sacramento, and at the annual meetings of CSG's regions, The Southern Legislative Conference, The Midwestern Legislative Conference, the Eastern Regional Conference and CSG West, and the Legislative Summit of the National Conference of State Legislatures, which is headquartered in Denver, Colorado, and has a lobbying office in Washington, D.C.

Additionally, privately funded organizations with ideological leanings have annual meetings attracting many legislators. These include the American Legislative Exchange Council (ALEC), a conservative organization, and State Innovation Exchange (SIX), its progressive counterpart.

=== Legislative procedure ===
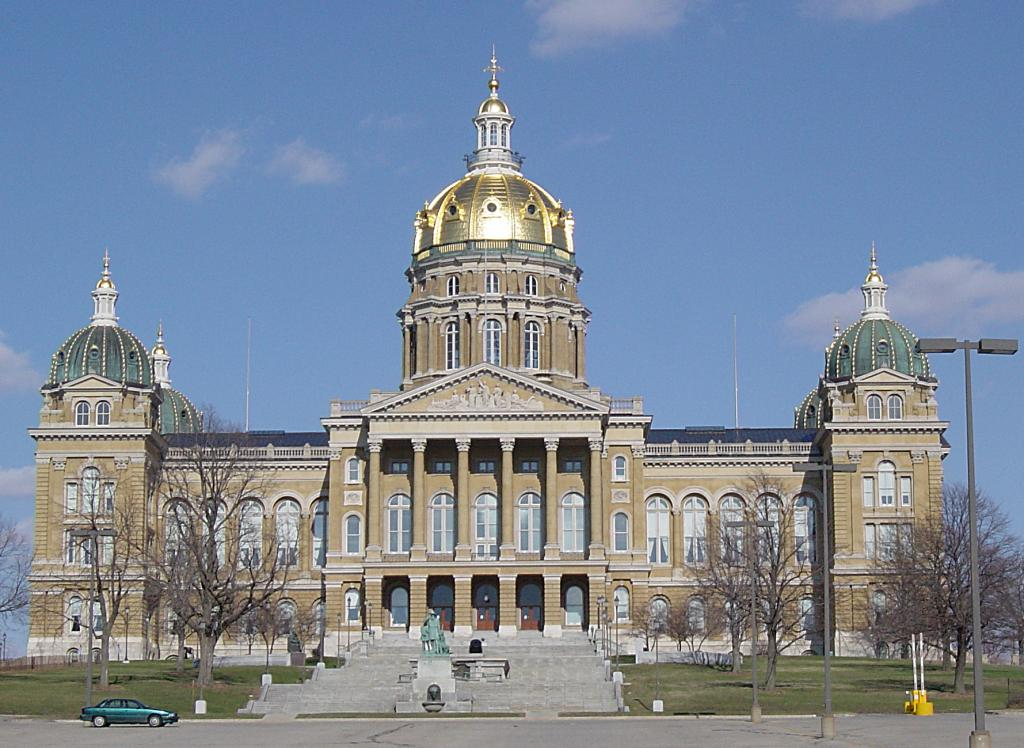
The Iowa State Capitol building, where the Iowa General Assembly convenes

Generally, the legislative bodies and their committees use either Mason's Manual of Legislative Procedure, or an amended form thereof. During official meetings, a professional parliamentarian is available to ensure that legislation and accompanying discussion proceed as orderly as possible without bias.

==== Bill drafting and submission ====
The lawmaking process begins with the introduction of a bill in either the House of Representatives or the Senate. Bills may be introduced in either house, sometimes with the exception of bills increasing or decreasing revenue, which must originate in the House of Representatives. The order of business in each house provides a proper time for the introduction of bills.

As of 2017, 24 of 99 chambers have limits on the number of bills that a legislator can introduce per year according to the NCSL. Most limits are set by internal legislative rules, while Louisiana's legislature is limited by constitutional amendment.

Bills are usually assigned consecutive numbers, given in the order of their introduction, to facilitate identification. Usually, a bill cannot become enacted until it has been read on a certain number of days in each house. Upon introduction, a bill is usually read by its title only, constituting the first reading of the bill. Because a bill is usually read only by its title, it is important that the title give the members notice of the subject matter contained in the bill.

When a bill passes wherein most votes are from the minority party and "moderate" members of a majority party, this is known as the majority being "rolled". When there are bills which most of the majority oppose, roll rates are a measure of the majority party's avoidance of voting on those bills.

A 2013 study of state legislatures found that of the 99 studied, about half, 53, had roll rates below 5%, and most, 83, had roll rates below 10%.

==== Committee review ====
Committees review bills, often holding hearings to gather information and opinions, and can propose amendments to bills similar to legislative bodies throughout the world. Most bills cannot be enacted into law until it has been referred to, acted upon by, and returned from, a standing committee in each house. Reference to committee usually follows the first reading of the bill.

Each committee is set up to consider bills relating to a particular subject. Standing committees are charged with the important responsibility of examining bills and recommending action to the Senate or House. Often on days when a legislature is not in session, the committees of each house meet, and consider the bills that have been referred to them, to decide if the assigned bills should be reported for further action.

For most bills, the recommendations of the committee are followed, although either house is free to accept or reject the action of the committee. Bills reported favorably by a committee may be placed on a regular calendar (the agenda of the deliberative body).

Most of the work of the legislature is done by committees. The legislature as a whole relies on its committees to report out only those bills deserving the consideration of the entire house.

Through standing committees, each bill is addressed by a group of members who have special knowledge of its subject. Some members of the legislature have expert knowledge of particular subjects of legislation, and these members are usually placed on committees to take full advantage of this specialized knowledge. For this reason, the legislature often accepts the final recommendations of its standing committees. As has been noted, however, the legislature does not completely abdicate its responsibility for the consideration of pending bills. If the need arises, the members of either house can force a committee to take action on a bill, or they can ignore the committee's recommendations.

==== Pocket veto and discharge petitions ====
Pocket veto powers are common, which allows a committee to "kill" a bill, sometimes without even a public vote; in Colorado, the power was notably repealed in a citizen initiative constitutional amendment in 1988 driven by various reform groups.

When a committee refuses to vote a bill out of committee, a discharge petition can be passed by the broader membership. The specifics vary from state to state; for example, in 2004, a report found that New York State "places more restrictions than any other state legislature on motions to discharge a bill from a committee", which led to subsequent reforms.

==== Reports of Committee ====
After a committee has completed work on a bill, it reports the bill to the appropriate house during the "reports of committees" in the daily order of business. Reported bills are immediately given a second reading. The houses do not vote on a bill at the time it is reported; however, reported bills are placed on the calendar for the next legislative day. This second reading is made by title only.

The regular calendar is a list of bills that have been favorably reported from committee and are ready for consideration by the membership of the entire house.

==== Third reading ====
Regardless of exactly where a bill is placed on the calendar, once the bill is considered and adopted, this is called the third reading. At this third reading of the bill, the entire legislature gives consideration to its passage. At this time, the bill may be studied in detail, debated, amended, and read at length before final passage.

If the majority vote in favor of the bill, it is recorded as passed.

==== Transmission to second house ====
A bill that is passed in one house is transmitted, along with a formal message, to the other house. If the bill is not reported from committee or is not considered by the full house, the bill is defeated.

The house of origin, upon return of its amended bill, may take any one of several courses of action. It may concur in the amendment by the adoption of a motion to that effect, then, the bill, having been passed by both houses in identical form, is ready for enrollment. Another possibility is that the house of origin may adopt a motion to non-concur in the amendment, at which point the bill dies. Finally, the house of origin may refuse to accept the amendment but request that a conference committee be appointed. The other house usually agrees to the request, and the presiding officer of each house appoints members to the conference committee.

==== Conference committees ====
A conference committee is often empaneled to discuss the points of difference between the two houses' versions of the same bill, and tries to reach an agreement between them, so that the identical bill can be passed by both houses. If an agreement is reached and both houses adopt the conference committee's report, the bill is passed. If either house refuses to adopt the report of the conference committee, a motion may be made for further conference. If a conference committee is unable to reach an agreement, it may be discharged, and a new conference committee may be appointed. Some highly controversial bills may be referred to several different conference committees. If an agreement is never reached in conference prior to the end of the legislative session, the bill is lost.

When a bill has passed both houses in identical form, it is then ready for transmittal to the governor.

==== Governor's Approval or Veto ====
The governor may sign bills presented by the legislature, which completes its enactment into law. From this point, the bill becomes an act, and remains the law of the state, unless repealed by legislative action, or overturned by court decision. Governors who do not approve of the bill may veto it. In the event of a veto, the governor returns the bill to the house in which it originated, with a message of objections and amendments (if applicable) which might remove those objections. The bill is then reconsidered, and if a simple majority of the members of both houses agrees to the proposed executive amendments, it is returned to the governor for signature.

On the other hand, a qualified majority (two-thirds) of the members of each house can choose to approve a vetoed bill precisely as the legislature originally passed it, in which case it becomes a law over the governor's veto. If the governor fails to return a bill to the legislative house in which it originated within a specified number of days after it was presented, it becomes a law without their signature.

Bills that reach the governor less than a specified number of days before the end of the session may be approved within ten days after adjournment. Bills not approved within that time do not become law, known as a "pocket veto". This is the most conclusive form of veto, for the legislature (having adjourned) has no chance to reconsider the vetoed measure.

== See also ==
=== U.S. articles ===
- List of United States state legislatures
- List of current U.S. state legislators
- Comparison of U.S. state governments
- United States state legislatures' partisan trend
- Multi-member districts in the United States

=== Other countries ===
- State legislature (India)
- Legislative assemblies of Canadian provinces and territories
- Parliaments of the Australian states and territories
- State legislative assemblies of Brazil
- Houses of assembly of Nigerian states
