= 1992 Texas House of Representatives election =

- November 3, 1992

All 150 seats in the Texas House of Representatives 76 seats needed for a majority
	Majority party	Minority party
Leader	Gib Lewis (retired)	Tom Craddick
Party	Democratic	Republican
Leader since	January 11, 1983	January 9, 1973
Leader's seat	89th	82nd
Last election	93	57
Seats before	92	58
Seats won	92	58
Seat change	Steady	Steady
Popular vote	2,573,755	2,234,252
Percentage	52.13%	45.25%
Swing	▼2.39%	▲0.23%
- Democratic hold Democratic gain Republican hold Republican gain Democratic: 50–60% 60–70% 70–80% 80–90% ≥90% Republican: 50–60% 60–70% 70–80% 80–90% ≥90%
Speaker before election
Gib Lewis
Democratic
Elected Speaker
Pete Laney
Democratic

The 1992 Texas House of Representatives elections took place as part of the biennial United States elections. Texas voters elected state representatives in all 150 State House of Representatives districts. The winners of this election served in the 73rd Texas Legislature, with seats apportioned according to the 1990 United States census. State representatives serve for two-year terms. Democrats maintained their majority of 92 out of 150 seats. As of 2026, this is the last time Democrats won the statewide popular vote for the Texas House.

== Background ==
Democrats had held control of the Texas House of Representatives since Reconstruction. Republicans had gained one seat due to special elections after the resignation of Democrat Bruce Gibson of District 58. Republican Bernard Erickson won the special election outright to avoid a runoff, becoming the first Republican to ever represent the district.

== Redistricting ==
Following the release of the 1990 census results, Democrats fully controlled the redistricting process. Republicans sued over the Texas House's map that was originally passed. The courts partially overhauled the map as a result of these lawsuits. Democrats codified the court's map into law in a January 1992 special session.

House districts follow the "county line rule," effectively granting individual counties delegations of state house seats based on their population. The census found that Texas had a population of 14,229,191 in 1980, giving each district an "ideal population" of 94,861 people. In 1990, the "ideal population for a district" was 113,243 people based on a statewide population of 16,986,510. Counties with at least this number of people must fully contain at least one state house district. Counties with sufficient population for two or more districts must be divided into that number of districts. Should a county have sufficient population for one or more district plus a fraction of another, one district from another county may extend into it to represent the remaining population. District delegations for counties with at least one district changed as follows following the 1990 Census:

County	1980 pop.	Seats	Partial	1990 pop.	Seats	Partial	+/– W	+/– P
Bell County	157,820	1	Yes	191,073	1	Yes	Steady	Steady
Bexar County	988,971	10	No	1,185,394	11	No	▲1	Steady
Brazoria County	169,587	1	Two	191,707	1	Yes	Steady	▼
Brazos County	93,588	1	No	121,862	1	Yes	Steady	▲
Cameron County	209,727	2	Yes	260,120	2	Yes	Steady	Steady
Collin County	144,576	1	Two	264,036	2	Yes	▲1	▼
Dallas County	1,556,419	17	No	1,852,691	16	No	▼1	Steady
Denton County	143,126	1	Yes	273,644	2	Yes	▲1	Steady
Ector County	115,374	1	Yes	118,934	1	Yes	Steady	Steady
El Paso County	479,899	5	No	591,610	5	No	Steady	Steady
Fort Bend County	130,962	1	Yes	225,421	2	No	▲1	▼
Galveston County	195,738	2	No	217,396	2	No	Steady	Steady
Gregg County	99,495	1	No	104,948	0	Yes	▼1	▲
Harris County	2,409,547	26	No	2,818,101	25	No	▼1	Steady
Hidalgo County	283,323	3	No	383,545	3	Yes	Steady	▲
Jefferson County	248,651	2	Two	239,389	2	Yes	Steady	▼
Lubbock County	211,651	2	Yes	222,636	2	No	Steady	▼
McLennan County	170,755	1	Yes	189,123	1	Yes	Steady	Steady
Montgomery County	127,222	1	Yes	182,201	1	Yes	Steady	Steady
Nueces County	268,215	2	Yes	291,145	2	Yes	Steady	Steady
Potter County	98,637	1	No	97,874	0	Yes	▼1	▲
Smith County	128,366	1	Yes	151,309	1	Yes	Steady	Steady
Tarrant County	860,880	9	No	1,170,103	10	No	▲1	Steady
Taylor County	110,932	1	Yes	119,655	1	Yes	Steady	Steady
Travis County	419,573	4	Yes	576,407	5	No	▲1	▼
Webb County	99,258	1	No	133,239	1	Yes	Steady	▲
Wichita County	121,082	1	Yes	122,378	1	Yes	Steady	Steady
Williamson County	76,521	0	Yes	139,551	1	Yes	▲1	Steady

== Results ==
Despite Republican George H. W. Bush's victory in Texas in the concurrent presidential election, Republicans made no net gains over the Democrats in the Texas House. A large number of retirements and primary defeats led to a turnover of over 30 House members. In Harris County, a narrow election result in District 144 led to a contested election between Democrat Donald Fogo and Republican Robert Talton. Early ballots had Fogo in the lead, but later counts gave the lead to Talton. A recount confirmed Talton's victory, but Fogo contested the election. A special panel in the Texas House later upheld Talton's victory, flipping the seat to the Republicans.

=== Statewide ===
Summary of the November 3, 1992 Texas House of Representatives election results
Party	Candidates	Votes	%	Seats	+/–
Democratic Party	115	2,573,755	52.13%	92	Steady
Republican Party	89	2,234,252	45.25%	58	Steady
Libertarian Party	29	129,353	2.62%	0	–
Total		4,937,360	100.00%	150	–

Popular vote
Democratic	52.13%
Republican	45.25%
Libertarian	2.62%

House seats won
Democratic	61.33%
Republican	38.67%

=== Close races ===
1. District 38, 0.26% (gain)
2. District 144, 0.28% (gain)
3. District 134, 2.54%
4. District 13, 3.64%
5. District 52, 3.72% (gain)
6. District 57, 8.54%
7. District 81, 8.58% (gain)
8. District 89, 8.77%
9. District 10, 9.54%
10. District 87, 9.74%
11. District 106, 9.76% (gain)

=== Results by district ===
District	Democratic		Republican		Libertarian		Total		Result
District	Votes	%	Votes	%	Votes	%	Votes	%	Result
District 1	30,216	100.00%	-	-	-	-	30,216	100.00%	Democratic hold
District 2	25,051	61.48%	15,697	38.52%	-	-	40,748	100.00%	Democratic hold
District 3	30,733	100.00%	-	-	-	-	30,733	100.00%	Democratic hold
District 4	23,117	55.30%	18,685	44.70%	-	-	41,802	100.00%	Democratic gain
District 5	25,125	66.29%	12,778	33.71%	-	-	37,903	100.00%	Democratic hold
District 6	-	-	35,321	100.00%	-	-	35,321	100.00%	Republican hold
District 7	-	-	29,855	100.00%	-	-	29,855	100.00%	Republican hold
District 8	31,437	72.73%	11,789	27.27%	-	-	43,226	100.00%	Democratic hold
District 9	34,024	100.00%	-	-	-	-	34,024	100.00%	Democratic hold
District 10	19,173	45.23%	23,217	54.77%	-	-	42,390	100.00%	Republican hold
District 11	28,740	100.00%	-	-	-	-	28,740	100.00%	Democratic hold
District 12	33,028	100.00%	-	-	-	-	33,028	100.00%	Democratic hold
District 13	21,062	51.82%	19,579	48.18%	-	-	40,641	100.00%	Democratic hold
District 14	-	-	31,649	100.00%	-	-	31,649	100.00%	Republican hold
District 15	-	-	35,491	100.00%	-	-	35,491	100.00%	Republican hold
District 16	14,981	34.83%	28,027	65.17%	-	-	43,008	100.00%	Republican hold
District 17	33,129	100.00%	-	-	-	-	33,129	100.00%	Democratic hold
District 18	32,166	100.00%	-	-	-	-	32,166	100.00%	Democratic hold
District 19	31,306	71.92%	12,223	28.08%	-	-	43,529	100.00%	Democratic hold
District 20	27,131	65.76%	14,125	34.24%	-	-	41,256	100.00%	Democratic hold
District 21	30,101	60.24%	19,870	39.76%	-	-	49,971	100.00%	Democratic hold
District 22	29,864	100.00%	-	-	-	-	29,864	100.00%	Democratic hold
District 23	24,672	100.00%	-	-	-	-	24,672	100.00%	Democratic hold
District 24	31,605	100.00%	-	-	-	-	31,605	100.00%	Democratic hold
District 25	-	-	33,332	100.00%	-	-	33,332	100.00%	Republican hold
District 26	16,138	32.65%	33,288	67.35%	-	-	49,426	100.00%	Republican hold
District 27	22,270	66.88%	11,030	33.12%	-	-	33,300	100.00%	Democratic gain
District 28	32,005	100.00%	-	-	-	-	32,005	100.00%	Democratic hold
District 29	26,224	100.00%	-	-	-	-	26,224	100.00%	Democratic hold
District 30	18,041	44.86%	22,177	55.14%	-	-	40,218	100.00%	Republican hold
District 31	28,958	100.00%	-	-	-	-	28,958	100.00%	Democratic hold
District 32	30,084	100.00%	-	-	-	-	30,084	100.00%	Democratic hold
District 33	19,741	56.11%	15,443	43.89%	-	-	35,184	100.00%	Democratic hold
District 34	21,260	100.00%	-	-	-	-	21,260	100.00%	Democratic hold
District 35	25,116	100.00%	-	-	-	-	25,116	100.00%	Democratic hold
District 36	14,761	100.00%	-	-	-	-	14,761	100.00%	Democratic gain
District 37	13,367	100.00%	-	-	-	-	13,367	100.00%	Democratic hold
District 38	12,237	50.13%	12,172	49.87%	-	-	24,409	100.00%	Democratic gain
District 39	15,149	100.00%	-	-	-	-	15,149	100.00%	Democratic hold
District 40	15,237	100.00%	-	-	-	-	15,237	100.00%	Democratic hold
District 41	15,099	100.00%	-	-	-	-	15,099	100.00%	Democratic hold
District 42	19,102	100.00%	-	-	-	-	19,102	100.00%	Democratic hold
District 43	26,101	100.00%	-	-	-	-	26,101	100.00%	Democratic hold
District 44	29,174	100.00%	-	-	-	-	29,174	100.00%	Democratic hold
District 45	-	-	31,560	74.22%	10,961	25.78%	42,521	100.00%	Republican hold
District 46	28,504	100.00%	-	-	-	-	28,504	100.00%	Democratic hold
District 47	23,987	34.59%	45,355	65.41%	-	-	69,342	100.00%	Republican gain
District 48	36,058	65.51%	18,983	34.49%	-	-	55,041	100.00%	Democratic hold
District 49	39,106	100.00%	-	-	-	-	39,106	100.00%	Democratic hold
District 50	32,766	87.11%	-	-	4,848	12.89%	37,614	100.00%	Democratic hold
District 51	26,628	70.20%	11,306	29.80%	-	-	37,934	100.00%	Democratic hold
District 52	23,443	48.14%	25,259	51.86%	-	-	48,702	100.00%	Republican gain
District 53	-	-	39,480	100.00%	-	-	39,480	100.00%	Republican hold
District 54	21,081	100.00%	-	-	-	-	21,081	100.00%	Democratic hold
District 55	-	-	21,076	100.00%	-	-	21,076	100.00%	Republican hold
District 56	18,131	40.31%	26,853	59.69%	-	-	44,984	100.00%	Republican hold
District 57	19,296	54.27%	16,261	45.73%	-	-	35,557	100.00%	Democratic hold
District 58	18,454	42.00%	25,486	58.00%	-	-	43,940	100.00%	Republican hold
District 59	22,689	100.00%	-	-	-	-	22,689	100.00%	Democratic hold
District 60	27,728	62.16%	16,876	37.84%	-	-	44,604	100.00%	Democratic hold
District 61	28,709	63.83%	16,269	36.17%	-	-	44,978	100.00%	Democratic hold
District 62	29,768	100.00%	-	-	-	-	29,768	100.00%	Democratic hold
District 63	17,987	38.06%	26,651	56.39%	2,622	5.55%	47,260	100.00%	Republican gain
District 64	-	-	35,079	100.00%	-	-	35,079	100.00%	Republican hold
District 65	15,305	36.86%	26,219	63.14%	-	-	41,524	100.00%	Republican hold
District 66	-	-	43,645	85.32%	7,508	14.68%	51,153	100.00%	Republican hold
District 67	-	-	35,408	83.97%	6,759	16.03%	42,167	100.00%	Republican gain
District 68	32,719	100.00%	-	-	-	-	32,719	100.00%	Democratic hold
District 69	31,304	100.00%	-	-	-	-	31,304	100.00%	Democratic hold
District 70	29,037	100.00%	-	-	-	-	29,037	100.00%	Democratic hold
District 71	-	-	32,463	100.00%	-	-	32,463	100.00%	Republican hold
District 72	33,576	100.00%	-	-	-	-	33,576	100.00%	Democratic hold
District 73	27,627	61.16%	17,548	38.84%	-	-	45,175	100.00%	Democratic hold
District 74	22,779	100.00%	-	-	-	-	22,779	100.00%	Democratic hold
District 75	16,308	100.00%	-	-	-	-	16,308	100.00%	Democratic hold
District 76	22,122	100.00%	-	-	-	-	22,122	100.00%	Democratic hold
District 77	14,797	100.00%	-	-	-	-	14,797	100.00%	Democratic hold
District 78	-	-	25,443	100.00%	-	-	25,443	100.00%	Republican hold
District 79	-	-	21,041	100.00%	-	-	21,041	100.00%	Republican hold
District 80	26,634	100.00%	-	-	-	-	26,634	100.00%	Democratic hold
District 81	16,404	45.71%	19,482	54.29%	-	-	35,886	100.00%	Republican gain
District 82	-	-	32,539	100.00%	-	-	32,539	100.00%	Republican hold
District 83	11,628	39.24%	18,004	60.76%	-	-	29,632	100.00%	Republican hold
District 84	16,907	33.60%	33,407	66.40%	-	-	50,314	100.00%	Republican hold
District 85	25,206	100.00%	-	-	-	-	25,206	100.00%	Democratic hold
District 86	-	-	36,420	100.00%	-	-	36,420	100.00%	Republican hold
District 87	14,720	45.13%	17,897	54.87%	-	-	32,617	100.00%	Republican hold
District 88	32,755	100.00%	-	-	-	-	32,755	100.00%	Democratic hold
District 89	20,446	51.06%	16,934	42.29%	2,665	6.66%	40,045	100.00%	Democratic hold
District 90	19,645	100.00%	-	-	-	-	19,645	100.00%	Democratic hold
District 91	-	-	32,663	82.26%	7,042	17.74%	39,705	100.00%	Republican hold
District 92	14,901	30.24%	32,208	65.36%	2,167	4.40%	49,276	100.00%	Republican hold
District 93	13,654	37.18%	20,565	56.00%	2,503	6.82%	36,722	100.00%	Republican hold
District 94	-	-	39,072	100.00%	-	-	39,072	100.00%	Republican hold
District 95	31,378	100.00%	-	-	-	-	31,378	100.00%	Democratic hold
District 96	-	-	34,124	82.08%	7,450	17.92%	41,574	100.00%	Republican hold
District 97	18,074	30.56%	41,059	69.44%	-	-	59,133	100.00%	Republican hold
District 98	-	-	38,914	100.00%	-	-	38,914	100.00%	Republican hold
District 99	-	-	36,045	83.74%	6,997	16.26%	43,042	100.00%	Republican hold
District 100	18,609	69.47%	8,180	30.53%	-	-	26,789	100.00%	Democratic hold
District 101	13,231	34.79%	24,800	65.21%	-	-	38,031	100.00%	Republican hold
District 102	-	-	36,703	100.00%	-	-	36,703	100.00%	Republican hold
District 103	13,438	81.42%	-	-	3,067	18.58%	16,505	100.00%	Democratic hold
District 104	10,158	66.05%	5,222	33.95%	-	-	15,380	100.00%	Democratic gain
District 105	15,536	71.63%	-	-	6,154	28.37%	21,690	100.00%	Democratic hold
District 106	15,615	45.12%	18,995	54.88%	-	-	34,610	100.00%	Republican gain
District 107	17,601	53.41%	12,248	37.16%	3,108	9.43%	32,957	100.00%	Democratic hold
District 108	13,729	23.63%	41,503	71.45%	2,858	4.92%	58,090	100.00%	Republican hold
District 109	24,125	100.00%	-	-	-	-	24,125	100.00%	Democratic gain
District 110	27,029	71.06%	11,010	28.94%	-	-	38,039	100.00%	Democratic hold
District 111	24,550	65.07%	13,179	34.93%	-	-	37,729	100.00%	Democratic hold
District 112	-	-	32,310	100.00%	-	-	32,310	100.00%	Republican hold
District 113	-	-	28,121	82.06%	6,149	17.94%	34,270	100.00%	Republican hold
District 114	-	-	33,653	100.00%	-	-	33,653	100.00%	Republican hold
District 115	19,264	85.48%	-	-	3,273	14.52%	22,537	100.00%	Democratic hold
District 116	21,957	100.00%	-	-	-	-	21,957	100.00%	Democratic hold
District 117	16,506	100.00%	-	-	-	-	16,506	100.00%	Democratic hold
District 118	19,147	100.00%	-	-	-	-	19,147	100.00%	Democratic hold
District 119	21,949	100.00%	-	-	-	-	21,949	100.00%	Democratic hold
District 120	21,965	100.00%	-	-	-	-	21,965	100.00%	Democratic hold
District 121	-	-	36,166	100.00%	-	-	36,166	100.00%	Republican hold
District 122	-	-	38,838	88.55%	5,024	11.45%	43,862	100.00%	Republican hold
District 123	-	-	39,044	87.83%	5,410	12.17%	44,454	100.00%	Republican hold
District 124	22,105	100.00%	-	-	-	-	22,105	100.00%	Democratic hold
District 125	19,605	61.68%	12,179	38.32%	-	-	31,784	100.00%	Democratic gain
District 126	-	-	40,114	100.00%	-	-	40,114	100.00%	Republican hold
District 127	-	-	36,728	84.16%	6,913	15.84%	43,641	100.00%	Republican hold
District 128	21,590	100.00%	-	-	-	-	21,590	100.00%	Democratic hold
District 129	-	-	34,318	80.59%	8,264	19.41%	42,582	100.00%	Republican hold
District 130	-	-	37,161	100.00%	-	-	37,161	100.00%	Republican hold
District 131	23,517	85.10%	-	-	4,118	14.90%	27,635	100.00%	Democratic hold
District 132	23,784	55.81%	18,835	44.19%	-	-	42,619	100.00%	Democratic hold
District 133	-	-	39,518	87.95%	5,413	12.05%	44,931	100.00%	Republican hold
District 134	17,317	50.15%	16,439	47.61%	774	2.24%	34,530	100.00%	Democratic hold
District 135	15,851	35.95%	26,551	60.23%	1,684	3.82%	44,086	100.00%	Republican hold
District 136	9,536	19.25%	37,594	75.88%	2,412	4.87%	49,542	100.00%	Republican hold
District 137	19,553	59.12%	12,231	36.98%	1,290	3.90%	33,074	100.00%	Democratic hold
District 138	18,218	58.52%	11,759	37.78%	1,152	3.70%	31,129	100.00%	Democratic hold
District 139	19,542	100.00%	-	-	-	-	19,542	100.00%	Democratic hold
District 140	14,150	100.00%	-	-	-	-	14,150	100.00%	Democratic hold
District 141	25,558	100.00%	-	-	-	-	25,558	100.00%	Democratic hold
District 142	24,651	100.00%	-	-	-	-	24,651	100.00%	Democratic hold
District 143	15,939	100.00%	-	-	-	-	15,939	100.00%	Democratic hold
District 144	13,323	49.86%	13,400	50.14%	-	-	26,723	100.00%	Republican gain
District 145	11,992	66.15%	6,137	33.85%	-	-	18,129	100.00%	Democratic hold
District 146	29,800	100.00%	-	-	-	-	29,800	100.00%	Democratic hold
District 147	21,076	77.63%	6,073	22.37%	-	-	27,149	100.00%	Democratic hold
District 148	13,253	66.49%	5,911	29.66%	768	3.85%	19,932	100.00%	Democratic hold
District 149	-	-	23,518	100.00%	-	-	23,518	100.00%	Republican hold
District 150	-	-	32,472	100.00%	-	-	32,472	100.00%	Republican hold
Total	2,573,755	52.13%	2,234,252	45.25%	129,353	2.62%	4,937,360	100.00%	
