= United States state legislatures' partisan trend =

This chart shows the trends in the partisan composition of the various state legislatures in the United States. In most cases the data point for each year is July 1, a time when few elections are scheduled. Most states hold legislative elections in the even numbered years, so the data points below are near the end of the term for most states. However, 2018 data is for the beginning of the year. Nebraska is not included in the national summaries below. Vacancies are not listed.

National summary		2022	2020	2018	2013	2010	2008	2006	2004
Lower houses		R 31-18	R 28-20	R 31-18	R 29-18, 1 tie	D 33–16	D 30–19	R 25–23, 1 tie	R 26–23
Upper houses		R 31-18	R 31-18	R 36-14	R 29-18, 1 Coal.	D 28–20, 1 Coal.	D 28–20, 1 Coal.	24–24, 1 tie	R 27–21, 1 tie
Both houses controlled by one party		R 30-17, 2 split	R 28-19, 2 split	R 32-14, 4 split	R 26-15, 8 split	D 27–14, 8 split	D 23–13, 13 split	R 20–19, 10 split	R 21–17, 11 split
Governor and both houses controlled by one party		R 23-14, 12 divided	R 21-15, 14 divided	R 26-7, 17 divided	R 24-13, 13 divided	D 16–9, 24 divided	D 14–9, 26 divided	R 12–8, 29 divided	R 12–8, 29 divided
State	House	2022	2020	2018	2013	2010	2008	2006	2004
Alabama	House	R 75-28	R 75-28	R 70-33	R 66–39	D 60–45	D 62–43	D 63–42	D 64-41
Alabama	Senate	R 27-8	R 27-8	R 26-7, 1 Ind.	R 22–12, 1 Ind.	D 21–13, 1 Ind.	D 22–13	D 25–10	D 25-10
Alaska	House	Coal. 21-19	Coal. 23-17	D 22–18	R 24–16	R 22–18	R 23–17	R 26–14	R 27-13
Alaska	Senate	Coal. 14-6	R 13-7	R 14-6	R 13-7	Coal. 16–4	Coal. 15–5	R 12–8	R 12-8
Arizona	House	R 31-29	R 31-29	R 35-25	R 40–20	R 36–24	R 33–27	R 38–22	R 39-20, 1 Ind.
Arizona	Senate	R 26-7	R 17-13	R 17-13	R 21–9	R 18–12	R 17–13	R 18–12	R 17-13
Arkansas	House	R 78-22	R 76-25	R 75-24	D 55–44	D 72–28	D 75-25	D 72-28	D 70-30
Arkansas	Senate	R 26-8	R 26-9	R 25-9	D 20–15	D 27–8	D 27-8	D 27-8	D 27-8
California	Assembly	D 56-19	D 61-17, 1 Ind.	D 53-25	D 52–28	D 50–29, 1 Ind.	D 48-32	D 48-32	D 48-32
California	Senate	D 31-9	D 29-11	D 27-13	D 25–15	D 26–14	D 25-15	D 25-15	D 25-15
Colorado	House	D 41-24	D 41-24	D 37-27	R 33-32	D 38–27	D 40-25	D 35-30	R 37-28
Colorado	Senate	D 20-15	D 19-16	R 18-17	D 20–15	D 20–15	D 20-15	D 18-17	R 18-17
Connecticut	House	D 95-53	D 91-60	D 79-72	D 100-51	D 114–37	D 107-44	D 99-52	D 95-56
Connecticut	Senate	D 23-13	D 22-14	Tied D 18-18	D 23-13	D 24–12	D 23-13	D 24-12	D 21-15
Delaware	House	D 26-15	D 26-15	D 25-16	D 26-15	D 24–16	R 22-19	R 26-15	R 29-12
Delaware	Senate	D 14-7	D 12-9	D 11-10	D 14-7	D 15–6	D 13-8	D 13-8	D 13-8
Florida	House	R 78-40	R 72-46	R 76-40	R 81-39	R 76–44	R 78-42	R 85-35	R 81-39
Florida	Senate	R 24-15	R 23-17	R 24-15	R 28-12	R 26–14	R 26-14	R 26-14	R 26-14
Georgia	House	R 103-77	R 105-75	R 116-62	R 113-66, 1 Ind.	R 105–74, 1 Ind.	R 107-73	R 100-79, 1 Ind.	D 107-72, 1 Ind.
Georgia	Senate	R 34-22	R 35-21	R 36-17	R 36-20	R 34–22	R 34-22	R 34-22	R 30-26
Hawaii	House	D 47-4	D 46-5	D 45-5	D 43-8	D 45–6	D 44-7	D 41-10	D 36-15
Hawaii	Senate	D 24-1	D 24-1	D 25-0	D 24-1	D 23–2	D 21-4	D 20-5	D 20-5
Idaho	House	R 58-12	R 56-14	R 59-11	R 57-13	R 52–18	R 51-19	R 57-13	R 54-16
Idaho	Senate	R 28-6	R 28-7	R 29-6	R 28–7	R 28–7	R 28-7	R 28-7	R 28-7
Illinois	House	D 72-45	D 73-44	D 67-51	D 64-54	D 70–48	D 67-51	D 65-53	D 66-52
Illinois	Senate	D 41-18	D 40-19	D 37-22	D 35-24	D 37–22	D 37-22	D 31-27 1 Ind.	D 32-26, 1 Ind.
Indiana	House	R 71-29	R 66-33	R 70-30	R 59-40	D 52–47, 1 Ind.	D 51-49	R 52-48	D 51-49
Indiana	Senate	R 38-11	R 40-10	R 41-9	R 37-13	R 33–17	R 33-17	R 33-17	R 32-18
Iowa	House	R 60-40	R 53-47	R 59-41	R 60-40	D 56–44	D 53-47	R 51-49	R 54-46
Iowa	Senate	R 31-18	R 32-18	R 28-20, 1 Ind.	D 26-24	D 31–19	D 30-20	25-25	R 29-21
Kansas	House	R 85-39	R 84-41	R 85-40	R 92-33	R 77–48	R 78-47	R 83-42	R 80-45
Kansas	Senate	R 29-11	R 29-11	R 31-9	R 32-8	R 31–9	R 30-10	R 30-10	R 30-10
Kentucky	House	R 75-25	R 62-38	R 64-36	D 58-42	D 65–35	D 64-36	D 56-44	D 64-36
Kentucky	Senate	R 30-8	R 28-10	R 27-11	R 22–15, 1 Ind.	R 22–15, 1 Ind.	R 21-16, 1 Ind.	R 21-16, 1 Ind.	R 22-16
Louisiana	House	R 68-33	R 68-35, 2 Ind.	R 60-41, 3 Ind.	R 52-49, 4 Ind.	D 52–50, 3 Ind.	D 53-50, 2 Ind.	D 67-37, 1 Ind.	D 67-37, 1 Ind.
Louisiana	Senate	R 26-12	R 27-12	R 25-14	R 20-19	D 22–15, 2 Ind.	D 23-16	D 24-15	D 25-14
Maine	House	D 79-66, 5 Ind.	D 87-56, 6 Ind.	D 80-70	R 78-72, 1 Ind.	D 95–55, 1 Ind.	D 90-59, 2 Ind.	73-73, 4 Ind, 1 Green	D 82-66, 4 Ind, 1 Green
Maine	Senate	D 22-13	D 21-14	R 18-17	R 20-14	D 20–15	D 18-17	D 19-16	D 18-17
Maryland	House	D 98-42	D 99-42	D 91-49	D 98-43	D 104–36, 1 Ind.	D 104-37	D 98-43	D 98-43
Maryland	Senate	D 32-15	D 32-14	D 33-14	D 35-12	D 33–14	D 33-14	D 33-14	D 33-14
Massachusetts	House	D 129-29	D 127-31, 1 Ind.	D 125-34, 1 Ind.	D 128-31	D 143–16, 1 Ind.	D 141-19	D 139-21	D 136-23, 1 Ind.
Massachusetts	Senate	D 36-3	D 36-4	D 33-6	D 36-4	D 35–5	D 35-5	D 34-6	D 33-7
Michigan	House	R 56-52	R 58-51	R 63-47	R 63-47	D 67–43	D 58-52	R 58-49	R 63-46
Michigan	Senate	R 22-16	R 22-16	R 27-11	R 26-12	R 21–17	R 21-17	R 22-16	R 22-16
Minnesota	House	D 70-64	D 75-55, 4 NP	R 76-57	R 72-62	DFL 87–47	DFL 85-48, 1 Ind.	R 68-66	R 81-53
Minnesota	Senate	R 34-31, 2 Ind.	R 35-32	R 34-33	R 37-30	DFL 46–21	DFL 45-22	DFL 37-29, 1 Ind.	D 35-31, 1 Ind.
Mississippi	House	R 75-46	R 73-45, 1 Ind.	R 73-47	D 72-50	D 74–48	D 75-47	D 75-47	D 76-46
Mississippi	Senate	R 36-15	R 34-16	R 31-19	R 27-25	D 27–25	D 27-25	D 28-24	D 29-23
Missouri	House	R 112-49	R 113-48	R 112-45	R 106-57	R 89–74	R 92-71	R 96-66	R 90-73
Missouri	Senate	R 24-10	R 23-8	R 24-9	R 26-8	R 23–11	R 20-14	R 23-11	R 20-14
Montana	House	R 67-33	R 58-42	R 59-41	R 68-32	D 50–50	R 50-49, 1 Const.	50-50	R 53-47
Montana	Senate	R 31-19	R 30-20	R 32-18	R 28-22	R 27–23	D 26-24	D 26-24	R 29-21
Nebraska	Unicameral and non–partisan Senate with 49 members								
Nevada	Assembly	D 26-16	D 29-13	D 27-14	D 26-16	D 28–14	D 27-15	D 26-16	D 23-19
Nevada	Senate	D 11-9	D 13-8	D 11-9	D 11-10	D 12–9	R 11-10	R 12-9	R 13-8
New Hampshire	House	R 207-188	D 231-158, 1 Ind.	R 219-174, 3 Lib.	R 298-102	D 225–175	D 239-161	R 247-152	R 279-121
New Hampshire	Senate	R 14-10	D 14-10	R 14-10	R 19-5	D 14–10	D 14-10	R 16-8	R 18-6
New Jersey	Assembly	D 46-34	D 52-28	D 52-28	D 47–33	D 47–33	D 48-32	D 49-31	D 47-33
New Jersey	Senate	D 24-16	D 25-15	D 24-16	D 24–16	D 23–17	D 23-17	D 22-18	D 22-18
New Mexico	House	D 44-24	D 45-24	D 38-32	D 37-33	D 45–25	D 42-28	D 42-28	D 43-27
New Mexico	Senate	D 26-15, 1 Ind.	D 26-16	D 26-16	D 27-15	D 27–15	D 24-18	D 24-18	D 24-18
New York	Assembly	D 104-43, 1 Ind.	D 103-42, 1 Ind.	D 106-41, 1 IP	D 100-48, 2 Vac.	D 108–42	D 108-42	D 105-45	D 102-47
New York	Senate	D 43-20	D 40-20	R 32-31	R 32-30	D 32–30	R 32-30	R 35-27	R 37-24
North Carolina	House	R 69-51	R 64-55	R 75-45	R 67-52	D 68–52	D 68-52	D 63-57	R 61-59
North Carolina	Senate	R 28-22	R 28-21	R 35-15	R 31-19	D 30–20	D 31-19	D 29-21	D 27-23
North Dakota	House	R 80-14	R 79-15	R 81-13	R 69-25	R 58–36	R 61-33	R 67-27	R 66-28
North Dakota	Senate	R 40-7	R 37-10	R 38-9	R 35-12	R 26–21	R 26-21	R 32-15	R 31-16
Ohio	House	R 64-34	R 61-38	R 65-33	R 59-40	D 53–46	R 53-46	R 60-38, 1 Vac.	R 62-37
Ohio	Senate	R 25-8	R 24-9	R 23-9	R 23-10	R 21–12	R 21-12	R 22-11	R 22-11
Oklahoma	House	R 82-18	R 77-23	R 71-28	R 70-31	R 62–39	R 57-44	R 57-44	D 53-48
Oklahoma	Senate	R 39-9	R 38-9	R 39-7	R 32-16	R 26–22	D 24-24	D 25-22	D 28-20
Oregon	House	D 37-22	D 38-22	D 35-24	30-30	D 36–24	D 31-29	R 33-27	R 35-25
Oregon	Senate	D 18-11, 1 Ind.	D 18-12	D 17-13	D 16-14	D 18–12	D 18-11, 1 Ind.	D 18-12	15-15
Pennsylvania	House	R 112-88	R 109-93	R 121-80	R 112-91	D 104–99	D 102-101	R 109-93	R 109-94
Pennsylvania	Senate	R 28-21, 1 Ind.	R 28-21, 1 Ind.	R 34-16	R 30–20	R 30–20	R 29-21	R 29-20	R 29-21
Rhode Island	House	D 65-10	D 66-8, 1 Ind.	D 64-11	D 65-10	D 69–6	D 60-15	D 60-15	D 63-11, 1 Ind.
Rhode Island	Senate	D 33-5	D 33-5	D 33-5	D 29-8 1 Ind.	D 33–4, 1 Ind.	D 33-5	D 33-5	D 32-6
South Carolina	House	R 79-43	R 78-45	R 78-43	R 75-48 1 Ind.	R 71–53	R 73-51	R 73-51	R 73-51
South Carolina	Senate	R 29-16	R 27-19	R 28-18	R 27-19	R 27–19	R 26-20	R 26-20	R 25-21
South Dakota	House	R 62-8	R 59-11	R 59-10	R 50-19 1 Ind.	R 46–24	R 50-20	R 51-19	R 49-21
South Dakota	Senate	R 32-3	R 30-5	R 29-6	R 30-5	R 20–14, 1 Ind.	R 20-15	R 25-10	R 26-9
Tennessee	House	R 73-26	R 73-26	R 74-25	R 64-33 1 Ind.	R 50–48, 1 Ind.	D 53-46	D 53-46	D 54-45
Tennessee	Senate	R 27-5	R 28-5	R 25-5	R 19-13; 1 Vac.	R 19–14	R 16-16, 1 Ind.	R 17-15	D 18-15
Texas	House	R 85-64	R 83-67	R 95-55	R 101-49	R 76–74	R 79-71	R 86-64	R 88-62
Texas	Senate	R 18-13	R 19-12	R 20-11	R 19–12	R 19–12	R 20-11	R 19-12	R 19-12
Utah	House	R 58-17	R 59-16	R 62-13	R 58-17	R 53–22	R 55-20	R 56-19	R 56-19
Utah	Senate	R 23-6	R 23-6	R 24-5	R 22-7	R 21–8	R 21-8	R 21-8	R 22-7
Vermont	House	D 95-43, 7 Prog., 5 Ind.	D 95-44, 7 Prog, 5 Ind.	D 83-53, 7 Prog, 7 Ind.	D 95–48, 4 Prog, 3 Ind.	D 95–48, 5 Prog, 2 Ind.	D 93-49, 6 Prog. 2 Ind.	D 83-60, 6 Prog, 1 Ind.	R 73-71, 4 Prog, 2 Ind.
Vermont	Senate	D 21-7, 2 Prog.	D 22-6, 2 Prog.	D 21-7, 2 Prog.	D 22–8, 1 Prog.	D 22–7, 1 Prog.	D 23-7	D 21-9	D 19-11
Virginia	House	R 52-48	D 55-44	R 51-49	R 59–39, 2 Ind.	R 59–39, 2 Ind.	R 53-45, 2 Ind.	R 56-40, 3 Ind.	R 61-37, 2 Ind.
Virginia	Senate	D 21-19	D 21-19	R 21-19	D 22–18	D 22–18	D 21-19	R 23-17	R 24-16
Washington	House	D 57-41	D 57-14	D 50-48	D 56-42	D 64–34	D 63-35	D 56-42	D 52-46
Washington	Senate	D 29-20	D 29-20	D 25-24	D 27-22	D 31–18	D 32-17	D 26-23	R 25-24
West Virginia	House	R 78-22	R 58-41, 1 Ind.	R 62-35, 1 Ind.	D 65-35	D 79–21	D 72-28	D 68-32	D 69-31
West Virginia	Senate	R 23-11	R 20-14	R 22-12	D 28–6	D 28–6	D 23-11	D 21-13	D 24-10
Wisconsin	Assembly	R 61-38	R 63-34	R 63-35	R 60-38 1 Ind.	D 52–46, 1 Ind.	R 52-47	R 59-39	R 59-40
Wisconsin	Senate	R 21-12	R 18-13	R 19-13	R 19-14	D 18–15	D 18-15	R 19-14	R 18-15
Wyoming	House	R 51-7, 1 Lib., 1 Ind.	R 50-9, 1 Ind.	R 51-9	R 50-10	R 41–18	R 43-17	R 46-14	R 45-15
Wyoming	Senate	R 28-2	R 27-3	R 27-3	R 26-4	R 23–7	R 23-7	R 23-7	R 20-10

== See also ==
- List of United States state legislatures
- Political party strength in U.S. states
