= Comparison of U.S. state and territory governments =

In the United States, the government of each of the 50 states is structured in accordance with its individual constitution. In turn, each state constitution must be grounded in republican principles. Article IV, Section 4, Clause 1 of the United States Constitution tasks the federal government with assuring that each state's government is so organized.

All state governments are modeled after the federal government and consist of three branches (although the three-branch structure is not Constitutionally required): executive, legislative, and judicial. All state governments are also organized as presidential systems where the governor is both head of government and head of state (even though this too is not required). The government of each of the five permanently inhabited U.S. territories is modeled and organized in a like fashion.

Each state is itself a sovereign entity, and as such, reserves the right to organize in any way (within the above stated parameter) deemed appropriate by its people. As a result, while the governments of the various states share many similar features, they often vary greatly with regard to form and substance. No two state governments are identical. The following tables compare and contrast some of the features of U.S. state governments.

== Legislative ==
With the exception of Nebraska, all American state legislatures are bicameral, meaning there is one legislative body separated into two units. Nebraska eliminated its lower house with a referendum during the 1936 elections. Also, some systems, such as the New York State Legislature, have two legislative bodies while never technically referring to them in the state constitution as a single body. These dual systems are generally considered bicameral.

State legislative branch	Lower house				Upper house					Ratio	Total size
State legislative branch	Name	Size	Term length (years)	Term limit	Name	Size	Term length (years)	Term limit	Filibuster possible	Lower to Upper house size	Total size
Alabama Legislature	Alabama House of Representatives	105	4	None	Alabama Senate	35	4	None	Yes	3	140
Alaska Legislature	Alaska House of Representatives	40	2	None	Alaska Senate	20	4	None	Yes	2	60
Arizona Legislature	Arizona House of Representatives	60	2	Four consecutive terms	Arizona Senate	30	2	Four consecutive terms	No	2	90
Arkansas General Assembly	Arkansas House of Representatives	100	2	Three terms	Arkansas Senate	35	2 or 4	Two 4 year terms	Yes	2.857143	135
California State Legislature	California State Assembly	80	2	12 years in either house, combined (Note: The new limit was decided by referendum as Proposition 28, in June 2012. Between 1990 and that date, one could serve 3 terms in the House and 2 in the Senate, which means the new limit is globally earlier but roughly doubles in each body.)	California State Senate	40	4	12 years in either house, combined	No	2	120
Colorado General Assembly	Colorado House of Representatives	65	2	Four consecutive terms	Colorado Senate	35	4	Two consecutive terms	No	1.857143	100
Connecticut General Assembly	Connecticut House of Representatives	151	2	None	Connecticut Senate	36	2	None	Yes	4.194444	187
Delaware General Assembly	Delaware House of Representatives	41	2	None	Delaware Senate	21	2 or 4	None	No	1.952381	62
Florida Legislature	Florida House of Representatives	120	2	Four terms	Florida Senate	40	2 or 4	Two terms	Yes	3	160
Georgia General Assembly	Georgia House of Representatives	180	2	None	Georgia Senate	56	2	None	No	3.214286	236
Hawaii State Legislature	Hawaii House of Representatives	51	2	None	Hawaii Senate	25	4	None	Yes	2.04	76
Idaho Legislature	Idaho House of Representatives	70	2	None	Idaho Senate	35	2	None	Yes	2	105
Illinois General Assembly	Illinois House of Representatives	118	2	None	Illinois Senate	59	2 or 4	None	No	2	177
Indiana General Assembly	Indiana House of Representatives	100	2	None	Indiana Senate	50	4	None	No	2	150
Iowa General Assembly	Iowa House of Representatives	100	2	None	Iowa Senate	50	4	None	No	2	150
Kansas Legislature	Kansas House of Representatives	125	2	None	Kansas Senate	40	4	None	No	3.125	165
Kentucky General Assembly	Kentucky House of Representatives	100	2	None	Kentucky Senate	38	4	None	No	2.631579	138
Louisiana State Legislature	Louisiana House of Representatives	105	4	Three terms	Louisiana State Senate	39	4	Three terms	No	2.692308	144
Maine Legislature	Maine House of Representatives	153	2	Four terms	Maine Senate	35	2	Four terms	Yes	4.371429	188
Maryland General Assembly	Maryland House of Delegates	141	4	None	Maryland State Senate	47	4	None	No	3	188
General Court of Massachusetts	Massachusetts House of Representatives	160	2	None	Massachusetts Senate	40	2	None	No	4	200
Michigan Legislature	Michigan House of Representatives	110	2	12 years in either house, combined	Michigan Senate	38	4	12 years in either house, combined	No	2.894737	148
Minnesota Legislature	Minnesota House of Representatives	134	2	None	Minnesota Senate	67	2 or 4	None	No	2	201
Mississippi Legislature	Mississippi House of Representatives	122	4	None	Mississippi State Senate	52	4	None	Yes	2.346154	174
Missouri General Assembly	Missouri House of Representatives	163	2	Four terms	Missouri Senate	34	4	Eight years (Two terms)	Yes	4.794118	197
Montana State Legislature	Montana House of Representatives	100	2	Four terms	Montana Senate	50	4	Two terms	No	2	150
Nebraska Legislature	—N/a	—N/a	—N/a	—N/a	Nebraska Legislature	49	4	Two terms	Yes	—N/a	49
Nevada Legislature	Nevada Assembly	42	2	Six terms	Nevada Senate	21	4	Three terms	No	2	63
New Hampshire General Court	New Hampshire House of Representatives	400	2	None	New Hampshire Senate	24	2	None	No	16.66667	424
New Jersey Legislature	New Jersey General Assembly	80	2	None	New Jersey Senate	40	2 or 4	None	No	2	120
New Mexico Legislature	New Mexico House of Representatives	70	2	None	New Mexico Senate	42	4	None	No	1.666667	112
New York State Legislature	New York State Assembly	150	2	None	New York State Senate	63	2	None	No	2.380952	213
North Carolina General Assembly	North Carolina House of Representatives	120	2	None	North Carolina Senate	50	2	None	No	2.4	170
North Dakota Legislative Assembly	North Dakota House of Representatives	94	4	Two terms	North Dakota Senate	47	4	Two terms	No	2	141
Ohio General Assembly	Ohio House of Representatives	99	2	Four terms	Ohio Senate	33	4	Two terms	No	3	132
Oklahoma Legislature	Oklahoma House of Representatives	101	2	12 years in either house, combined	Oklahoma Senate	48	4	12 years in either house, combined	No	2.104167	149
Oregon Legislative Assembly	Oregon House of Representatives	60	2	None (Note: State representatives were limited to three terms (6 years) until term limits were repealed by Oregon Ballot Measure 3 (1992).)	Oregon State Senate	30	4	None (Note: State senators were limited to two terms (8 years) until term limits were repealed by Oregon Ballot Measure 3 (1992).)	No	2	90
Pennsylvania General Assembly	Pennsylvania House of Representatives	203	2	None	Pennsylvania State Senate	50	4	None	No	4.06	253
Rhode Island General Assembly	Rhode Island House of Representatives	75	2	None	Rhode Island Senate	38	2	None	No	1.973684	113
South Carolina General Assembly	South Carolina House of Representatives	124	2	None	South Carolina Senate	46	4	None	Yes	2.695652	170
South Dakota State Legislature	South Dakota House of Representatives	70	2	Four terms	South Dakota Senate	35	4	Two terms	No	2	105
Tennessee General Assembly	Tennessee House of Representatives	99	2	None	Tennessee Senate	33	4	None	No	3	132
Texas Legislature	Texas House of Representatives	150	2	None	Texas Senate	31	2 or 4	None	Yes	4.83871	181
Utah State Legislature	Utah House of Representatives	75	2	None	Utah State Senate	29	4	None	Yes	2.586207	104
Vermont General Assembly	Vermont House of Representatives	150	2	None	Vermont Senate	30	2	None	Yes	5	180
Virginia General Assembly	Virginia House of Delegates	100	2	None	Senate of Virginia	40	4	None	No	2.5	140
Washington State Legislature	Washington House of Representatives	98	2	None	Washington State Senate	49	4	None	No	2	147
West Virginia Legislature	West Virginia House of Delegates	100	2	None	West Virginia Senate	34	4	None	No	2.941176	134
Wisconsin Legislature	Wisconsin State Assembly	99	2	None	Wisconsin Senate	33	4	None	No	3	132
Wyoming Legislature	Wyoming House of Representatives	62	2	None	Wyoming Senate	31	4	None	No	2	90

=== Supermajority requirements ===
While only 13 states have a filibuster, there are often restrictions on the majority a state needs to raise taxes.

Legend Effective supermajority system Majority rule (22) Mixed system

Key	State	Notes
	Alabama	The Alabama State Senate allows a filibuster, and has a general three-fifths requirement to enact cloture. A simple majority of 18 is acceptable when dealing with the budget and redistricting.
	Arkansas	Arkansas, along with Rhode Island, is one of the only states that requires a supermajority to pass a budget. A three-fourths majority is required for appropriations, except for education, highways, and paying down the state debt, which require a simple majority.
	California	From 1933 to 2011 there was a two-thirds requirement for general fund appropriations for purposes other than public schools (Const., Art. IV, Sec. 12). Because the Legislature typically passes one main budget bill, the requirement effectively applied to the whole budget bill. There has been a two-thirds requirement for tax increases since Proposition 13 in 1978. In 2010, voters approved Proposition 25, eliminating the 2/3 requirement for the budget, but keeping it for tax increases.

== Executive ==
The governor is the chief executive official in each state.

State	Governor term length (years)	Governor term limit	First in line of succession	Lieutenant Governor method of election	Secretary of State	Attorney General	Treasurer
Alabama	4	Two consecutive terms	Lieutenant Governor	Separate election	Elected	Elected	Elected
Alaska	4	Two terms	Lieutenant Governor	Same ticket in general election, separate election in primary	No	Appointed by Governor	Appointed by Governor
Arizona	4	Two consecutive terms (Note: There are no limits on the number of terms a governor may serve in total as long as there is a four-year break after a second term.)	Lieutenant Governor	Same ticket	Elected	Elected	Elected
Arkansas	4	Two terms	Lieutenant Governor	Separate election	Elected	Elected	Elected
California	4	Two terms	Lieutenant Governor	Separate election	Elected	Elected	Elected
Colorado	4	Two terms	Lieutenant Governor	Same ticket	Elected	Elected	Elected
Connecticut	4	None	Lieutenant Governor	Same ticket in general election, separate election in primary	Elected	Elected	Elected
Delaware	4	Two terms	Lieutenant Governor	Separate election	Appointed by Governor	Elected	Elected
Florida	4	Two consecutive terms	Lieutenant Governor	Same ticket	Appointed by Governor	Elected	Elected
Georgia	4	Two terms	Lieutenant Governor	Separate election	Elected	Elected	Appointed by Governor
Hawaii	4	Two terms	Lieutenant Governor	Same ticket in general election, separate election in primary	No	Appointed by Governor	Appointed by Governor
Idaho	4	None	Lieutenant Governor	Separate election	Elected	Elected	Elected
Illinois	4	None	Lieutenant Governor	Same ticket	Elected	Elected	Elected
Indiana	4	Two terms in a 12-year period (Note: Governors of Indiana may serve an unlimited number of terms, but may only serve for eight years in any twelve-year period. (Constitution of Indiana Article 5))	Lieutenant Governor	Same ticket	Elected	Elected	Elected
Iowa	4	None	Lieutenant Governor	Same ticket	Elected	Elected	Elected
Kansas	4	There is no lifetime limit on the number, but one must be out of office for at least one election cycle after serving 2 consecutive terms before being eligible again.	Lieutenant Governor	Same ticket	Elected	Elected	Elected
Kentucky	4	Two terms	Lieutenant Governor	Same ticket	Elected	Elected	Elected
Louisiana	4	Two terms	Lieutenant Governor	Separate election	Elected	Elected	Elected
Maine	4	Two consecutive terms	President of the Senate		Elected by legislature	Elected by legislature	Elected by legislature
Maryland	4	Two consecutive terms	Lieutenant Governor	Same ticket	Appointed by Governor	Elected	Elected by legislature
Massachusetts	4	None	Lieutenant Governor	Same ticket in general election, separate election in primary	Elected	Elected	Elected
Michigan	4	Two terms	Lieutenant Governor	Same ticket	Elected	Elected	Appointed by Governor
Minnesota	4	None	Lieutenant Governor	Same ticket	Elected	Elected	Appointed by Governor
Mississippi	4	Two terms	Lieutenant Governor	Separate election	Elected	Elected	Elected
Missouri	4	Two terms	Lieutenant Governor	Separate election	Elected	Elected	Elected
Montana	4	Two terms	Lieutenant Governor	Same ticket	Elected	Elected	Appointed by Governor
Nebraska	4	Two terms	Lieutenant Governor	Same ticket	Elected	Elected	Elected
Nevada	4	Two terms	Lieutenant Governor	Separate election	Elected	Elected	Elected
New Hampshire	2	None	President of the Senate		Elected by legislature	Appointed by Governor	Elected by legislature
New Jersey	4	Two terms	Lieutenant Governor	Same ticket	Appointed by Governor	Appointed by Governor	Appointed by Governor
New Mexico	4	Two terms	Lieutenant Governor	Same ticket in general election, separate election in primary	Elected	Elected	Elected
New York	4	None	Lieutenant Governor	Same ticket in general election, separate election in primary	Appointed by Governor	Elected	Elected
North Carolina	4	Two consecutive terms	Lieutenant Governor	Separate election	Elected	Elected	Elected
North Dakota	4	Two terms	Lieutenant Governor	Same ticket	Elected	Elected	Elected
Ohio	4	Two terms	Lieutenant Governor	Same ticket	Elected	Elected	Elected
Oklahoma	4	Two terms	Lieutenant Governor	Separate election	Appointed by Governor	Elected	Elected
Oregon	4	Two consecutive terms	Secretary of State		Elected	Elected	Elected
Pennsylvania	4	Two consecutive terms	Lieutenant Governor	Same ticket in general election, separate election in primary	Appointed by Governor	Elected	Elected
Rhode Island	4	Two terms	Lieutenant Governor	Separate election	Elected	Elected	Elected
South Carolina	4	Two terms	Lieutenant Governor	Same ticket	Elected	Elected	Elected
South Dakota	4	Two terms	Lieutenant Governor	Same ticket	Elected	Elected	Elected
Tennessee	4	Two terms	Lieutenant Governor	Title given to Speaker of the Senate	Elected by legislature	Appointed by Supreme Court	Elected by legislature
Texas	4	None	Lieutenant Governor	Separate election	Appointed by Governor	Elected	Elected
Utah	4	None	Lieutenant Governor	Same ticket	No	Elected	Elected
Vermont	2	None	Lieutenant Governor	Separate election	Elected	Elected	Elected
Virginia	4	No limit on number, but terms cannot be consecutive	Lieutenant Governor	Separate election	Appointed by Governor	Elected	Appointed by Governor
Washington	4	None	Lieutenant Governor	Separate election	Elected	Elected	Appointed by Governor
West Virginia	4	Two terms	Lieutenant Governor	Title given to President of the Senate	Elected	Elected	Elected
Wisconsin	4	None	Lieutenant Governor	Same ticket in general election, separate election in primary	Elected	Elected	Elected
Wyoming	4	Two terms	Secretary of State		Elected	Appointed by Governor	Elected

Note: Table does not distinguish between consecutive term limits and total term limits, unless otherwise noted.

== Judicial ==
State	Highest court	High court seats	High court term	High court judicial placement method	Mandatory retirement age (Note: Uncompleted entries do not indicate the lack of a retirement age, only a lack of data in this article. States without a mandatory retirement age will indicate "None".)
Alabama	Supreme Court of Alabama	9	6 years	Partisan election	
Alaska	Alaska Supreme Court	5	10 years	Missouri Plan	
Arizona	Arizona Supreme Court	7	6 years	Missouri Plan	70
Arkansas	Arkansas Supreme Court	7	8 years	Non-partisan election	
California	Supreme Court of California	7	12 years	Modified Missouri Plan	
Colorado	Colorado Supreme Court	7	10 years	Missouri Plan	
Connecticut	Connecticut Supreme Court	7	8 years	Election by State Legislature	70
Delaware	Delaware Supreme Court	5	12 years	Appointment by Governor	
Florida	Florida Supreme Court	7	6 years	Modified Missouri Plan	70 (or end of current term)
Georgia	Supreme Court of Georgia	7	6 years	Non-partisan election	
Hawaii	Supreme Court of Hawaii	5	10 years	Appointment by Governor	70
Idaho	Idaho Supreme Court	5	6 years	Non-partisan election	
Illinois	Supreme Court of Illinois	7	10 years	Partisan election	
Indiana	Indiana Supreme Court	5	10 years (Note: Retention election held after two years of service. Mandatory retirement at age 75.)	Missouri Plan	75 (Note: The Indiana retirement age is the same regardless of the length of the Justice's remaining term.)
Iowa	Iowa Supreme Court	7	8 years	Missouri Plan	72
Kansas	Kansas Supreme Court	7	6 years	Missouri Plan	70 (or end of current term)
Kentucky	Kentucky Supreme Court	7	8 years	Non-partisan election	
Louisiana	Supreme Court of Louisiana	7	10 years	Partisan election	
Maine	Maine Supreme Judicial Court	7	7 years	Appointment by Governor	
Maryland	Supreme Court of Maryland (Note: Name officially changed from Maryland Court of Appeals in 2022.)	7	10 years	Appointment by Governor	70
Massachusetts	Massachusetts Supreme Judicial Court	7	Lifetime	Appointment by Governor	70
Michigan	Michigan Supreme Court	7	8 years	Non-partisan election (Note: While Michigan law stipulates that State Supreme Court judges be listed on the "non-partisan" section on the ballot, only candidates who have been nominated by political parties with ballot access at their respective state conventions are allowed to stand in the succeeding general election. Subsequently, each party is only allowed to nominate as many candidates as there are supreme court seats up for election in a given year.)	Must be under 70 at time of election
Minnesota	Minnesota Supreme Court	7	6 years	Non-partisan election	70
Mississippi	Supreme Court of Mississippi	9	8 years	Non-partisan election	
Missouri	Supreme Court of Missouri	7	12 years	Missouri Plan	
Montana	Montana Supreme Court	7	8 years	Non-partisan election	
Nebraska	Nebraska Supreme Court	7	6 years	Missouri Plan	
Nevada	Supreme Court of Nevada	7	6 years	Non-partisan election	
New Hampshire	New Hampshire Supreme Court	5	Lifetime	Appointment by Governor	70
New Jersey	New Jersey Supreme Court	7	7 years	Appointment by Governor	70
New Mexico	New Mexico Supreme Court	5	8 years	Partisan election/Retention election	
New York	New York Court of Appeals	7	14 years	Appointment by Governor	70 (at end of calendar year)
North Carolina	North Carolina Supreme Court	7	8 years	Partisan election	
North Dakota	North Dakota Supreme Court	5	10 years	Non-partisan election	
Ohio	Ohio Supreme Court	7	6 years	Partisan election	70 (at end of term)
Oklahoma	Oklahoma Supreme Court; Oklahoma Court of Criminal Appeals	Supreme Court: 9 Court of Criminal Appeals: 5	6 years (both)	Missouri Plan	
Oregon	Oregon Supreme Court	7	6 years	Non-partisan election	75
Pennsylvania	Supreme Court of Pennsylvania	7	10 years	Partisan election	78
Rhode Island	Rhode Island Supreme Court	5	Lifetime	Missouri Plan	None
South Carolina	South Carolina Supreme Court	5	10 years	Election by State Legislature	72
South Dakota	South Dakota Supreme Court	5	8 years	Non-partisan election	
Tennessee	Tennessee Supreme Court	5	8 years	Tennessee Plan (Modified Missouri Plan)	
Texas	Texas Supreme Court; Texas Court of Criminal Appeals	9 (both)	6 years (both)	Partisan election	75 (may finish term or 4 years of term, whichever is shorter)
Utah	Utah Supreme Court	5	4 years	Missouri Plan	
Vermont	Vermont Supreme Court	5	6 years	Election by State Legislature	
Virginia	Supreme Court of Virginia	7	12 years	Election by State Legislature	70
Washington	Washington Supreme Court	9	6 years	Non-partisan election	75
West Virginia	Supreme Court of Appeals of West Virginia	5	12 years	Partisan election	
Wisconsin	Wisconsin Supreme Court	7	10 years	Non-partisan election	
Wyoming	Wyoming Supreme Court	5	8 years	Missouri Plan	

Note: Table does not distinguish between term lengths that result in a new election and term lengths that result in a retention vote but not a full election. g

== See also ==
- List of U.S. state constitutions
- Initiatives and referendums in the United States — compares states on what they allow
- Government of the District of Columbia
- Government of Puerto Rico
- Territories of the United States
- Female state legislators in the United States

== Sources ==
- National Conference of State Legislatures Term Limit Chart
- Term limit data for AZ AR CA CO FL LA MA MI MO MT NB NV OH OK SD WY , TermLimits.org, Accessed on June 27, 2009.
- Little, Thomas H. (2006). The legislative branch of state government: people, process, and politics. Bloomsbury Academic. ISBN 1-85109-761-9.
