= List of U.S. state representatives (Alabama to Missouri) =

This is a list of U.S. state representatives. This list contains the names of U.S. state representatives in the 25 states, listed alphabetically, from Alabama to Missouri. For the remaining 25 states, please see List of U.S. state representatives (Montana to Wyoming).

== Summary ==
State	State executive	Legislature name	Lower house				Upper house			
State	State executive	Legislature name	Name	Size	Party strength	Term (yrs.)	Name	Size	Party strength	Term (yrs.)
Alabama	Governor	Legislature	House of Representatives	105	R 76–29	4	Senate	35	R 27–8	4
Alaska	Governor	Legislature	House of Representatives	40	MC 21–19 (Note: The majority in the Alaska House of Representatives is held by a coalition of 14 Democrats, 2 Republicans and 5 Independents. The minority consists of 19 Republicans.)	2	Senate	20	MC 14–6 (Note: The majority in the Alaska Senate is held by a coalition of 9 Democrats and 5 Republicans. There are 6 Republicans outside the caucus.)	4
Arizona	Governor	State Legislature	House of Representatives	60	R 33–27	2	Senate	30	R 17–13	2
Arkansas	Governor	General Assembly	House of Representatives	100	R 80–20	2	Senate	35	R 29–6	4
California	Governor	State Legislature (Note: The Constitution of California names it the "California Legislature", but the legislature brands itself as the "California State Legislature".)	State Assembly	80	D 60–20	2	State Senate	40	D 30–10	4
Colorado	Governor	General Assembly	House of Representatives	65	D 43–22	2	Senate	35	D 23–12	4
Connecticut	Governor	General Assembly	House of Representatives	151	D 102–49	2	State Senate	36	D 25–11	2
Delaware	Governor	General Assembly	House of Representatives	41	D 27–14	2	Senate	21	D 15–6	4
Florida	Governor	Legislature	House of Representatives	120	R 86–34	2	Senate	40	R 27–12, 1 ind.	4
Georgia	Governor	General Assembly	House of Representatives	180	R 99–81	2	State Senate	56	R 33–23	2
Hawaii	Governor	Legislature	House of Representatives	51	D 41–10	2	Senate	25	D 22–3	4
Idaho	Governor	Legislature	House of Representatives	70	R 61–9	2	Senate	35	R 29–6	2
Illinois	Governor	General Assembly	House of Representatives	118	D 78–40	2	Senate	59	D 40–19	2 or 4
Indiana	Governor	General Assembly	House of Representatives	100	R 69–30, 1 ind.	2	Senate	50	R 40–10	4
Iowa	Governor	General Assembly	House of Representatives	100	R 67–33	2	Senate	50	R 33–17	4
Kansas	Governor	Legislature	House of Representatives	125	R 88–37	2	Senate	40	R 31–9	4
Kentucky	Governor	General Assembly	House of Representatives	100	R 80–20	2	Senate	38	R 32–6	4
Louisiana	Governor	Legislature (Note: The Constitution of Louisiana vests legislative authority in "a legislature, consisting of a Senate and a House of Representatives," and refers to it as "the legislature" throughout, without officially designating a term for the two houses together. However, the two bodies do use the term "Louisiana State Legislature" in official references to itself.)	House of Representatives	105	R 73–32	4	State Senate	39	R 28–11	4
Maine	Governor	Legislature	House of Representatives	151	D 75–73, 3 ind. (Note: There are three additional non-voting seats allocated to sovereign tribal nations within Maine. As of 2026, two seats of the three tribal seats are filled; the two current tribal representatives are non-partisan/independent but are not counted in this total.)	2	Senate	35	D 20–14, 1 ind.	2
Maryland	Governor	General Assembly	House of Delegates	141	D 102–39	4	Senate	47	D 34–13	4
Massachusetts	Governor	General Court	House of Representatives	160	D 134–25, 1 ind.	2	Senate	40	D 35–5	2
Michigan	Governor	Legislature	House of Representatives	110	R 58–52	2	Senate	38	D 20–18	4
Minnesota	Governor	Legislature	House of Representatives	134	DFL 67–66	2	Senate	67	DFL 34–33	2, 4, 4
Mississippi	Governor	Legislature	House of Representatives	122	R 78–42, 2 ind.	4	State Senate	52	R 34–18	4
Missouri	Governor	General Assembly	House of Representatives	163	R 111–52	2	Senate	34	R 24–10	4
Montana	Governor	Legislature	House of Representatives	100	R 58–42	2	Senate	50	R 32–18	4
Nebraska	Governor	Legislature	(Unicameral)				Legislature (Note: When Nebraska switched to a unicameral legislature in 1937, the lower house was abolished. All current Nebraskan legislators are referred to as "Senators", as the pre-1937 senate was the retained house.)	49	R 33–15, 1 ind. (Note: Nebraska's legislature is de jure nonpartisan but senators' political affiliations are publicly known and voting often happens along party lines; the de facto composition is given here.)	4
Nevada	Governor	Legislature	Assembly	42	D 27–15	2	Senate	21	D 13–8	4
New Hampshire	Governor	General Court	House of Representatives	400	R 220–179, 1 ind.	2	Senate	24	R 16–8	2
New Jersey	Governor	Legislature	General Assembly	80	D 57–23	2	Senate	40	D 25–15	2, 4, 4
New Mexico	Governor	Legislature	House of Representatives	70	D 44–26	2	Senate	42	D 26–16	4
New York	Governor	State Legislature	State Assembly	150	D 103–47	2	State Senate	63	D 41–22	2
North Carolina	Governor	General Assembly	House of Representatives	120	R 71–47, 2 ind.	2	Senate	50	R 30–20	2
North Dakota	Governor	Legislative Assembly	House of Representatives	94	R 83–11	4	Senate	47	R 42–5	4
Ohio	Governor	General Assembly	House of Representatives	99	R 65–34	2	Senate	33	R 24–9	4
Oklahoma	Governor	Legislature	House of Representatives	101	R 81–20	2	Senate	48	R 40–8	4
Oregon	Governor	Legislative Assembly	House of Representatives	60	D 37–23	2	State Senate	30	D 18–12	4
Pennsylvania	Governor	General Assembly	House of Representatives	203	D 103–100	2	State Senate	50	R 27–23	4
Rhode Island	Governor	General Assembly	House of Representatives	75	D 64–10, 1 ind.	2	Senate	38	D 34–4	2
South Carolina	Governor	General Assembly	House of Representatives	124	R 89–35	2	Senate	46	R 34–12	4
South Dakota	Governor	Legislature	House of Representatives	70	R 65–5	2	Senate	35	R 32–3	2
Tennessee	Governor	General Assembly	House of Representatives	99	R 75–24	2	Senate	33	R 27–6	4
Texas	Governor	Legislature	House of Representatives	150	R 88–62	2	Senate	31	R 19–12	4
Utah	Governor	State Legislature (Note: The Constitution of Utah names it the "Legislature of the State of Utah", but the legislature brands itself as the "Utah State Legislature".)	House of Representatives	75	R 61–14	2	State Senate	29	R 22–6, 1 FWD (Note: One senator is registered with the Forward Party.)	4
Vermont	Governor	General Assembly	House of Representatives	150	MC 94–56 (Note: The majority in the Vermont House of Representatives is held by a coalition of 87 Democrats, 3 Vermont Progressives and 4 independents. The minority consists of 56 Republicans.)	2	Senate	30	MC 17–13 (Note: The majority in the Vermont Senate is held by a coalition of 16 Democrats and 1 Vermont Progressive. 13 Republicans make up the minority.)	2
Virginia	Governor	General Assembly	House of Delegates	100	D 64–36	2	Senate	40	D 21–19	4
Washington	Governor	State Legislature (Note: The Constitution of Washington names it "the legislature of the state of Washington", but the legislature brands itself as the "Washington State Legislature".)	House of Representatives	98	D 59–39	2	State Senate	49	D 30–19	4
West Virginia	Governor	Legislature	House of Delegates	100	R 91–9	2	Senate	34	R 32–2	4
Wisconsin	Governor	State Legislature	State Assembly	99	R 54–45	2	Senate	33	R 18–15	4
Wyoming	Governor	Legislature	House of Representatives	62	R 56–6	2	Senate	31	R 29–2	4

== Superlatives ==
From the 50 state legislatures in the United States, the following superlatives emerge:

- Largest legislature: New Hampshire General Court (424 members)
- Smallest legislature: Nebraska Legislature (49 members)
- Largest upper house: Minnesota Senate (67 senators)
- Smallest upper house: Alaska Senate (20 senators)
- Largest lower house: New Hampshire House of Representatives (400 representatives)
- Smallest lower house: Alaska House of Representatives (40 representatives)

There are a total of 5,411 state representatives nationwide, with the average state house having 110 members.

== Terminology for lower houses ==
The 49 lower houses of state legislatures in the United States – Nebraska lacks a lower house – have various names:

- House of Representatives: 42 states;
- State Assembly: 4 states (California, Nevada, New York, and Wisconsin);
- House of Delegates: 2 states (Maryland and Virginia); and
- General Assembly: 1 state (New Jersey).

== Alabama ==
- Alabama House of Representatives#House roster

== Alaska ==
- Alaska House of Representatives#Current members (34th Alaska State Legislature)

== Arizona ==
- Arizona House of Representatives#Membership, 2025–2027

== Arkansas ==
- Arkansas House of Representatives#Current membership

== California ==
- California State Assembly#List of current representatives

== Colorado ==
- Colorado House of Representatives#Members

== Connecticut ==
- Connecticut House of Representatives#List of current members

== Delaware ==
- Delaware House of Representatives#Current members

== Florida ==
- Florida House of Representatives#Members, 2024–2026

== Georgia ==
- Georgia House of Representatives#List of current representatives

== Hawaii ==
- Hawaii House of Representatives#List of current members

== Idaho ==
- Idaho House of Representatives#Members of the Idaho House of Representatives

== Illinois ==
- Illinois House of Representatives#Members

== Indiana ==
- Indiana House of Representatives#Members of the Indiana House of Representatives

== Iowa ==
- Iowa House of Representatives#State representatives

== Kansas ==
- Kansas House of Representatives#Members of the Kansas House of Representatives

== Kentucky ==
- Kentucky House of Representatives#List of current representatives

== Louisiana ==
- Louisiana House of Representatives#Members

== Maine ==
- Maine House of Representatives#Members of the Maine House of Representatives

== Maryland ==
- Maryland House of Delegates#Membership

== Massachusetts ==
- 2025–2026 Massachusetts legislature#Representatives

== Michigan ==
- Michigan House of Representatives#Members

== Minnesota ==
- Minnesota House of Representatives#Members, 2025–2027

== Mississippi ==
- Mississippi House of Representatives#List of members

== Missouri ==
- Missouri House of Representatives#List of current representatives

== See also ==
- List of United States state legislatures
- List of U.S. state representatives (Montana to Wyoming)
- List of U.S. state senators
