= List of U.S. state representatives (Montana to Wyoming) =

This is a list of U.S. state representatives. This list contains the names of U.S. state representatives in the 25 states, listed alphabetically, from Montana to Wyoming. For the remaining 25 states, please see List of U.S. state representatives (Alabama to Missouri).

== Summary ==
State	State executive	Legislature name	Lower house				Upper house			
State	State executive	Legislature name	Name	Size	Party strength	Term (yrs.)	Name	Size	Party strength	Term (yrs.)
Alabama	Governor	Legislature	House of Representatives	105	R 76–29	4	Senate	35	R 27–8	4
Alaska	Governor	Legislature	House of Representatives	40	MC 21–19 (Note: The majority in the Alaska House of Representatives is held by a coalition of 14 Democrats, 2 Republicans and 5 Independents. The minority consists of 19 Republicans.)	2	Senate	20	MC 14–6 (Note: The majority in the Alaska Senate is held by a coalition of 9 Democrats and 5 Republicans. There are 6 Republicans outside the caucus.)	4
Arizona	Governor	State Legislature	House of Representatives	60	R 33–27	2	Senate	30	R 17–13	2
Arkansas	Governor	General Assembly	House of Representatives	100	R 80–20	2	Senate	35	R 29–6	4
California	Governor	State Legislature (Note: The Constitution of California names it the "California Legislature", but the legislature brands itself as the "California State Legislature".)	State Assembly	80	D 60–20	2	State Senate	40	D 30–10	4
Colorado	Governor	General Assembly	House of Representatives	65	D 43–22	2	Senate	35	D 23–12	4
Connecticut	Governor	General Assembly	House of Representatives	151	D 102–49	2	State Senate	36	D 25–11	2
Delaware	Governor	General Assembly	House of Representatives	41	D 27–14	2	Senate	21	D 15–6	4
Florida	Governor	Legislature	House of Representatives	120	R 86–34	2	Senate	40	R 27–12, 1 ind.	4
Georgia	Governor	General Assembly	House of Representatives	180	R 99–81	2	State Senate	56	R 33–23	2
Hawaii	Governor	Legislature	House of Representatives	51	D 41–10	2	Senate	25	D 22–3	4
Idaho	Governor	Legislature	House of Representatives	70	R 61–9	2	Senate	35	R 29–6	2
Illinois	Governor	General Assembly	House of Representatives	118	D 78–40	2	Senate	59	D 40–19	2 or 4
Indiana	Governor	General Assembly	House of Representatives	100	R 69–30, 1 ind.	2	Senate	50	R 40–10	4
Iowa	Governor	General Assembly	House of Representatives	100	R 67–33	2	Senate	50	R 33–17	4
Kansas	Governor	Legislature	House of Representatives	125	R 88–37	2	Senate	40	R 31–9	4
Kentucky	Governor	General Assembly	House of Representatives	100	R 80–20	2	Senate	38	R 32–6	4
Louisiana	Governor	Legislature (Note: The Constitution of Louisiana vests legislative authority in "a legislature, consisting of a Senate and a House of Representatives," and refers to it as "the legislature" throughout, without officially designating a term for the two houses together. However, the two bodies do use the term "Louisiana State Legislature" in official references to itself.)	House of Representatives	105	R 73–32	4	State Senate	39	R 28–11	4
Maine	Governor	Legislature	House of Representatives	151	D 75–73, 3 ind. (Note: There are three additional non-voting seats allocated to sovereign tribal nations within Maine. As of 2026, two seats of the three tribal seats are filled; the two current tribal representatives are non-partisan/independent but are not counted in this total.)	2	Senate	35	D 20–14, 1 ind.	2
Maryland	Governor	General Assembly	House of Delegates	141	D 102–39	4	Senate	47	D 34–13	4
Massachusetts	Governor	General Court	House of Representatives	160	D 134–25, 1 ind.	2	Senate	40	D 35–5	2
Michigan	Governor	Legislature	House of Representatives	110	R 58–52	2	Senate	38	D 20–18	4
Minnesota	Governor	Legislature	House of Representatives	134	DFL 67–66	2	Senate	67	DFL 34–33	2, 4, 4
Mississippi	Governor	Legislature	House of Representatives	122	R 78–42, 2 ind.	4	State Senate	52	R 34–18	4
Missouri	Governor	General Assembly	House of Representatives	163	R 111–52	2	Senate	34	R 24–10	4
Montana	Governor	Legislature	House of Representatives	100	R 58–42	2	Senate	50	R 32–18	4
Nebraska	Governor	Legislature	(Unicameral)				Legislature (Note: When Nebraska switched to a unicameral legislature in 1937, the lower house was abolished. All current Nebraskan legislators are referred to as "Senators", as the pre-1937 senate was the retained house.)	49	R 33–15, 1 ind. (Note: Nebraska's legislature is de jure nonpartisan but senators' political affiliations are publicly known and voting often happens along party lines; the de facto composition is given here.)	4
Nevada	Governor	Legislature	Assembly	42	D 27–15	2	Senate	21	D 13–8	4
New Hampshire	Governor	General Court	House of Representatives	400	R 220–179, 1 ind.	2	Senate	24	R 16–8	2
New Jersey	Governor	Legislature	General Assembly	80	D 57–23	2	Senate	40	D 25–15	2, 4, 4
New Mexico	Governor	Legislature	House of Representatives	70	D 44–26	2	Senate	42	D 26–16	4
New York	Governor	State Legislature	State Assembly	150	D 103–47	2	State Senate	63	D 41–22	2
North Carolina	Governor	General Assembly	House of Representatives	120	R 71–47, 2 ind.	2	Senate	50	R 30–20	2
North Dakota	Governor	Legislative Assembly	House of Representatives	94	R 83–11	4	Senate	47	R 42–5	4
Ohio	Governor	General Assembly	House of Representatives	99	R 65–34	2	Senate	33	R 24–9	4
Oklahoma	Governor	Legislature	House of Representatives	101	R 81–20	2	Senate	48	R 40–8	4
Oregon	Governor	Legislative Assembly	House of Representatives	60	D 37–23	2	State Senate	30	D 18–12	4
Pennsylvania	Governor	General Assembly	House of Representatives	203	D 103–100	2	State Senate	50	R 27–23	4
Rhode Island	Governor	General Assembly	House of Representatives	75	D 64–10, 1 ind.	2	Senate	38	D 34–4	2
South Carolina	Governor	General Assembly	House of Representatives	124	R 89–35	2	Senate	46	R 34–12	4
South Dakota	Governor	Legislature	House of Representatives	70	R 65–5	2	Senate	35	R 32–3	2
Tennessee	Governor	General Assembly	House of Representatives	99	R 75–24	2	Senate	33	R 27–6	4
Texas	Governor	Legislature	House of Representatives	150	R 88–62	2	Senate	31	R 19–12	4
Utah	Governor	State Legislature (Note: The Constitution of Utah names it the "Legislature of the State of Utah", but the legislature brands itself as the "Utah State Legislature".)	House of Representatives	75	R 61–14	2	State Senate	29	R 22–6, 1 FWD (Note: One senator is registered with the Forward Party.)	4
Vermont	Governor	General Assembly	House of Representatives	150	MC 94–56 (Note: The majority in the Vermont House of Representatives is held by a coalition of 87 Democrats, 3 Vermont Progressives and 4 independents. The minority consists of 56 Republicans.)	2	Senate	30	MC 17–13 (Note: The majority in the Vermont Senate is held by a coalition of 16 Democrats and 1 Vermont Progressive. 13 Republicans make up the minority.)	2
Virginia	Governor	General Assembly	House of Delegates	100	D 64–36	2	Senate	40	D 21–19	4
Washington	Governor	State Legislature (Note: The Constitution of Washington names it "the legislature of the state of Washington", but the legislature brands itself as the "Washington State Legislature".)	House of Representatives	98	D 59–39	2	State Senate	49	D 30–19	4
West Virginia	Governor	Legislature	House of Delegates	100	R 91–9	2	Senate	34	R 32–2	4
Wisconsin	Governor	State Legislature	State Assembly	99	R 54–45	2	Senate	33	R 18–15	4
Wyoming	Governor	Legislature	House of Representatives	62	R 56–6	2	Senate	31	R 29–2	4

== Superlatives ==
From the 50 state legislatures in the United States, the following superlatives emerge:

- Largest legislature: New Hampshire General Court (424 members)
- Smallest legislature: Nebraska Legislature (49 members)
- Largest upper house: Minnesota Senate (67 senators)
- Smallest upper house: Alaska Senate (20 senators)
- Largest lower house: New Hampshire House of Representatives (400 representatives)
- Smallest lower house: Alaska House of Representatives (40 representatives)

There are a total of 5,411 state representatives nationwide, with the average state house having 110 members

== Terminology for lower houses ==
The 49 lower houses of state legislatures in the United States – Nebraska lacks a lower house – have various names:

- House of Representatives: 41 states;
- State Assembly: 4 states (California, Nevada, New York, and Wisconsin);
- House of Delegates: 3 states (Maryland, Virginia, and West Virginia); and
- General Assembly: 1 state (New Jersey).

== Montana ==
- Montana House of Representatives#House Members

== Nebraska ==
Nebraska is the only state in the United States with a unicameral legislature. When Nebraska switched to a unicameral legislature in 1937, the lower house (the Nebraska House of Representatives) was abolished. All current Nebraskan legislators are referred to as "senators", as the pre-1937 upper house, the Nebraska Senate, was the retained house. Currently, the state's legislature is formally known as the Nebraska Legislature and is often referred to as "the Unicameral". (See Members of the Nebraska Legislature.)

== Nevada ==
- Nevada State Assembly#Members

== New Hampshire ==
- New Hampshire House of Representatives#List of members (2024–2026)

== New Jersey ==
- New Jersey General Assembly#List of state assembly members

== New Mexico ==
- New Mexico House of Representatives#Current members

== New York ==
- New York State Assembly#Members of the New York State Assembly

== North Carolina ==
- North Carolina House of Representatives#Members (2025–26 session)

== North Dakota ==
- North Dakota House of Representatives#Members of the 69th House

== Ohio ==
- Ohio House of Representatives#Members of the 136th House of Representatives

== Oklahoma ==
- Oklahoma House of Representatives#Current members

== Oregon ==
- Oregon House of Representatives#Current members

== Pennsylvania ==
- Pennsylvania House of Representatives#List of current representatives

== Rhode Island ==
- Rhode Island House of Representatives#Members of the Rhode Island House of Representatives

== South Carolina ==
- South Carolina House of Representatives#Current members

== South Dakota ==
- South Dakota House of Representatives#Members of the House for the 2025 legislative session

== Tennessee ==
- Tennessee House of Representatives#Members as of 2026

== Texas ==
- Texas House of Representatives#List of current representatives

== Utah ==
- Utah House of Representatives#Members of the 66th House of Representatives

== Vermont ==
- Vermont House of Representatives#Members

== Virginia ==
- Virginia House of Delegates#Members

== Washington ==
- Washington House of Representatives#Members (2025–2027, 69th Legislature)

== West Virginia ==
- West Virginia House of Delegates#Current members

== Wisconsin ==
- Wisconsin State Assembly#Members

== Wyoming ==
- Wyoming House of Representatives#Members of the Wyoming House of Representatives

== See also ==
- List of United States state legislatures
- List of U.S. state representatives (Alabama to Missouri)
- List of U.S. state senators
