= Bruce Gibson =

American politician (born 1953)

Bruce Gibson (Benjamin Bruce Gibson, born July 15, 1953) is a Texas lawyer, politician, tax consultant and lobbyist. He was a member of the Texas House of Representatives for Texas State District 58 from 1981 to 1992, serving in the 67th through 72nd sessions, resigning from the House in 1992 to become executive assistant to Texas Lieutenant Governor Bob Bullock.

He later served as president of the Texas Chamber of Commerce and subsequently as Chief of Staff to Texas Lieutenant Governor David Dewhurst.

He has a Bachelor of Arts degree in history from Texas Christian University and a law degree from the University of Texas School of Law.
