= List of former United States representatives =

This is the main page for the alphabetized list of former United States representatives, which is accessible by using the above template.

As of October 2025, 12,583 people served as members of Congress (both houses). 10,568 only served in the House of Representatives, 1,326 were only senators, and 689 people served in both chambers. 11,257 people have served in the House (counting people who were also senators). These numbers do not include non-voting members, of which an additional 147 people have been delegates from a territory of the District of Columbia and 34 people have been a resident commissioner from the Philippines or Puerto Rico.
