= 1996 Texas House of Representatives election =

- November 5, 1996

All 150 seats in the Texas House of Representatives 76 seats needed for a majority
	Majority party	Minority party
Leader	Pete Laney	Tom Craddick
Party	Democratic	Republican
Leader since	January 12, 1993	January 9, 1973
Leader's seat	85th	82nd
Last election	89	61
Seats before	87	63
Seats won	82	68
Seat change	▼5	▲5
Popular vote	2,015,951	2,502,499
Percentage	44.18%	54.84%
Swing	▼3.94%	▲3.85%
- Democratic hold Democratic gain Republican hold Republican gain Democratic: 40–50% 50–60% 60–70% 70–80% 80–90% ≥90% Republican: 50–60% 60–70% 70–80% 80–90% ≥90%
Speaker before election
Pete Laney
Democratic
Elected Speaker
Pete Laney
Democratic

The 1996 Texas House of Representatives elections took place as part of the biennial United States elections. Texas voters elected state representatives in all 150 State House of Representatives districts. The winners of this election served in the 75th Texas Legislature. State representatives serve for two-year terms. Republicans gained five seats from the Democrats, reducing the Democratic majority to 82 out of 150 seats.

== Background ==
Democrats had held control of the Texas House of Representatives since Reconstruction. After the 1994 elections, Republican governor George W. Bush appointed Democratic Representative Elton Bomer of the 11th district as the state insurance commissioner. In the ensuing special election, Republican Todd Staples narrowly avoided a runoff, defeating two Democrats to flip the seat. Later in 1995, Representative Warren Chisum of the 88th district switched from the Democratic Party to the Republican Party.

== Redistricting ==
Democrats had fully controlled the redistricting process in 1991, and Republicans sued over the Texas House's map. The courts partially overhauled the map as a result of these lawsuits. Democrats codified the court's map into law in a January 1992 special session. The 1995 lawsuit Thomas v. Bush further altered the maps, as the courts reached a settlement with the legislature to alter the several districts in Harris, Dallas, and Bexar Counties for the 1996 elections.

== Results ==
Despite having hopes of winning control of the chamber from the Democrats due to Texas's increasing Republican lean, Republicans only flipped five seats.

=== Statewide ===
Summary of the November 5, 1996 Texas House of Representatives election results
Party	Candidates	Votes	%	Seats	+/–
Democratic Party	100	2,015,951	44.18%	82	▼5
Republican Party	107	2,502,499	54.84%	68	▲5
Natural Law Party	8	23,023	0.50%	0	–
Libertarian Party	9	20,619	0.45%	0	–
Independent	1	673	0.01%	0	–
Write-in	1	345	0.01%	0	–
Total		4,563,110	100.00%	150	–

Popular vote
Republican	54.84%
Democratic	44.18%
Natural Law	0.50%
Libertarian	0.45%
Independent	0.01%
Write-in	0.01%

House seats won
Democratic	54.67%
Republican	45.33%

=== Close races ===
1. District 59, 0.04%
2. District 9, 1.04% (gain)
3. District 60, 1.18% (gain)
4. District 32, 2.00% (gain)
5. District 138, 2.02%
6. District 70, 2.30%
7. District 17, 2.62%
8. District 54, 5.58% (gain)
9. District 4, 5.76%
10. District 20, 6.06%
11. District 29, 6.88% (tipping-point district)
12. District 58, 7.84%
13. District 62, 7.88% (gain)
14. District 28, 9.76%

=== Results by district ===
District	Democratic		Republican		Others		Total		Result
District	Votes	%	Votes	%	Votes	%	Votes	%	Result
District 1	24,728	63.77%	14,050	36.23%	-	-	38,778	100.00%	Democratic hold
District 2	26,553	100.00%	-	-	-	-	26,553	100.00%	Democratic hold
District 3	26,303	100.00%	-	-	-	-	26,303	100.00%	Democratic hold
District 4	20,604	52.88%	18,362	47.12%	-	-	38,966	100.00%	Democratic hold
District 5	20,972	59.49%	14,279	40.51%	-	-	35,251	100.00%	Democratic hold
District 6	-	-	23,440	100.00%	-	-	23,440	100.00%	Republican hold
District 7	-	-	26,351	100.00%	-	-	26,351	100.00%	Republican hold
District 8	26,364	61.10%	16,783	38.90%	-	-	43,147	100.00%	Democratic hold
District 9	20,549	49.48%	20,979	50.52%	-	-	41,528	100.00%	Republican gain
District 10	-	-	27,012	100.00%	-	-	27,012	100.00%	Republican hold
District 11	15,605	43.82%	20,004	56.18%	-	-	35,609	100.00%	Republican hold
District 12	25,437	63.93%	14,354	36.07%	-	-	39,791	100.00%	Democratic hold
District 13	23,370	59.45%	15,942	40.55%	-	-	39,312	100.00%	Democratic hold
District 14	-	-	24,402	100.00%	-	-	24,402	100.00%	Republican hold
District 15	15,431	31.05%	34,264	68.95%	-	-	49,695	100.00%	Republican hold
District 16	-	-	32,061	100.00%	-	-	32,061	100.00%	Republican hold
District 17	20,976	51.31%	19,906	48.69%	-	-	40,882	100.00%	Democratic hold
District 18	24,483	60.15%	16,223	39.85%	-	-	40,706	100.00%	Democratic hold
District 19	26,685	68.97%	12,004	31.03%	-	-	38,689	100.00%	Democratic hold
District 20	22,059	53.03%	19,537	46.97%	-	-	41,596	100.00%	Democratic hold
District 21	33,377	87.59%	-	-	4,728	12.41%	38,105	100.00%	Democratic hold
District 22	25,034	100.00%	-	-	-	-	25,034	100.00%	Democratic hold
District 23	21,582	57.74%	15,796	42.26%	-	-	37,378	100.00%	Democratic hold
District 24	25,503	100.00%	-	-	-	-	25,503	100.00%	Democratic hold
District 25	14,315	33.06%	28,981	66.94%	-	-	43,296	100.00%	Republican hold
District 26	-	-	41,931	86.06%	6,790	13.94%	48,721	100.00%	Republican hold
District 27	20,503	60.46%	13,411	39.54%	-	-	33,914	100.00%	Democratic hold
District 28	22,078	54.88%	18,154	45.12%	-	-	40,232	100.00%	Democratic hold
District 29	17,041	53.44%	14,850	46.56%	-	-	31,891	100.00%	Democratic hold
District 30	-	-	25,894	100.00%	-	-	25,894	100.00%	Republican hold
District 31	25,296	70.52%	10,577	29.48%	-	-	35,873	100.00%	Democratic hold
District 32	21,818	49.00%	22,704	51.00%	-	-	44,522	100.00%	Republican gain
District 33	24,800	100.00%	-	-	-	-	24,800	100.00%	Democratic hold
District 34	22,924	100.00%	-	-	-	-	22,924	100.00%	Democratic hold
District 35	22,859	100.00%	-	-	-	-	22,859	100.00%	Democratic hold
District 36	14,009	61.32%	8,835	38.68%	-	-	22,844	100.00%	Democratic hold
District 37	13,034	69.43%	5,740	30.57%	-	-	18,774	100.00%	Democratic hold
District 38	15,529	100.00%	-	-	-	-	15,529	100.00%	Democratic hold
District 39	14,768	100.00%	-	-	-	-	14,768	100.00%	Democratic hold
District 40	15,816	71.28%	6,371	28.72%	-	-	22,187	100.00%	Democratic hold
District 41	15,112	66.35%	7,664	33.65%	-	-	22,776	100.00%	Democratic hold
District 42	19,019	100.00%	-	-	-	-	19,019	100.00%	Democratic hold
District 43	24,766	100.00%	-	-	-	-	24,766	100.00%	Democratic hold
District 44	26,492	100.00%	-	-	-	-	26,492	100.00%	Democratic hold
District 45	-	-	37,524	88.69%	4,784	11.31%	42,308	100.00%	Republican hold
District 46	20,856	56.37%	16,140	43.63%	-	-	36,996	100.00%	Democratic hold
District 47	22,106	29.34%	51,953	68.95%	1,287	1.71%	75,346	100.00%	Republican hold
District 48	34,850	100.00%	-	-	-	-	34,850	100.00%	Democratic hold
District 49	28,137	63.18%	16,399	36.82%	-	-	44,536	100.00%	Democratic hold
District 50	27,240	100.00%	-	-	-	-	27,240	100.00%	Democratic hold
District 51	21,300	71.80%	7,113	23.98%	1,254	4.23%	29,667	100.00%	Democratic hold
District 52	19,809	38.42%	31,752	61.58%	-	-	51,561	100.00%	Republican hold
District 53	15,515	27.29%	41,347	72.71%	-	-	56,862	100.00%	Republican hold
District 54	15,757	47.21%	17,620	52.79%	-	-	33,377	100.00%	Republican gain
District 55	-	-	22,829	100.00%	-	-	22,829	100.00%	Republican hold
District 56	-	-	29,981	100.00%	-	-	29,981	100.00%	Republican hold
District 57	18,245	58.58%	12,901	41.42%	-	-	31,146	100.00%	Democratic gain
District 58	18,364	46.08%	21,487	53.92%	-	-	39,851	100.00%	Republican hold
District 59	15,399	49.60%	15,387	49.56%	263	0.85%	31,049	100.00%	Democratic hold
District 60	21,409	49.41%	21,922	50.59%	-	-	43,331	100.00%	Republican gain
District 61	-	-	32,821	100.00%	-	-	32,821	100.00%	Republican hold
District 62	18,718	46.06%	21,920	53.94%	-	-	40,638	100.00%	Republican gain
District 63	-	-	36,418	100.00%	-	-	36,418	100.00%	Republican hold
District 64	-	-	36,830	100.00%	-	-	36,830	100.00%	Republican hold
District 65	-	-	28,495	100.00%	-	-	28,495	100.00%	Republican hold
District 66	-	-	48,127	100.00%	-	-	48,127	100.00%	Republican hold
District 67	-	-	33,026	100.00%	-	-	33,026	100.00%	Republican hold
District 68	26,245	100.00%	-	-	-	-	26,245	100.00%	Democratic hold
District 69	25,912	100.00%	-	-	-	-	25,912	100.00%	Democratic hold
District 70	17,834	51.15%	17,035	48.85%	-	-	34,869	100.00%	Democratic hold
District 71	-	-	30,683	100.00%	-	-	30,683	100.00%	Republican hold
District 72	28,102	100.00%	-	-	-	-	28,102	100.00%	Democratic hold
District 73	29,711	100.00%	-	-	-	-	29,711	100.00%	Democratic hold
District 74	22,994	100.00%	-	-	-	-	22,994	100.00%	Democratic hold
District 75	15,895	68.21%	7,409	31.79%	-	-	23,304	100.00%	Democratic hold
District 76	22,848	100.00%	-	-	-	-	22,848	100.00%	Democratic hold
District 77	16,839	100.00%	-	-	-	-	16,839	100.00%	Democratic hold
District 78	-	-	26,860	100.00%	-	-	26,860	100.00%	Republican hold
District 79	18,723	100.00%	-	-	-	-	18,723	100.00%	Democratic hold
District 80	-	-	21,169	100.00%	-	-	21,169	100.00%	Republican hold
District 81	-	-	23,967	100.00%	-	-	23,967	100.00%	Republican hold
District 82	-	-	30,771	100.00%	-	-	30,771	100.00%	Republican hold
District 83	-	-	18,119	83.00%	3,711	17.00%	21,830	100.00%	Republican hold
District 84	19,158	42.07%	26,385	57.93%	-	-	45,543	100.00%	Republican hold
District 85	20,813	64.58%	11,417	35.42%	-	-	32,230	100.00%	Democratic hold
District 86	-	-	38,216	100.00%	-	-	38,216	100.00%	Republican hold
District 87	-	-	23,050	100.00%	-	-	23,050	100.00%	Republican hold
District 88	-	-	32,115	100.00%	-	-	32,115	100.00%	Republican hold
District 89	15,643	44.87%	19,218	55.13%	-	-	34,861	100.00%	Republican gain
District 90	16,015	100.00%	-	-	-	-	16,015	100.00%	Democratic hold
District 91	-	-	29,998	100.00%	-	-	29,998	100.00%	Republican hold
District 92	-	-	30,953	100.00%	-	-	30,953	100.00%	Republican hold
District 93	-	-	21,064	100.00%	-	-	21,064	100.00%	Republican hold
District 94	-	-	32,685	88.73%	4,150	11.27%	36,835	100.00%	Republican hold
District 95	26,796	100.00%	-	-	-	-	26,796	100.00%	Democratic hold
District 96	-	-	32,553	100.00%	-	-	32,553	100.00%	Republican hold
District 97	-	-	38,701	100.00%	-	-	38,701	100.00%	Republican hold
District 98	-	-	38,901	100.00%	-	-	38,901	100.00%	Republican hold
District 99	-	-	32,764	100.00%	-	-	32,764	100.00%	Republican hold
District 100	17,296	68.58%	7,392	29.31%	532	2.11%	25,220	100.00%	Democratic hold
District 101	-	-	24,153	100.00%	-	-	24,153	100.00%	Republican hold
District 102	-	-	28,269	100.00%	-	-	28,269	100.00%	Republican hold
District 103	13,340	100.00%	-	-	-	-	13,340	100.00%	Democratic hold
District 104	10,086	72.35%	3,854	27.65%	-	-	13,940	100.00%	Democratic hold
District 105	14,305	61.81%	8,167	35.29%	673	2.91%	23,145	100.00%	Democratic hold
District 106	13,001	40.92%	18,774	59.08%	-	-	31,775	100.00%	Republican hold
District 107	16,238	58.06%	10,795	38.60%	933	3.34%	27,966	100.00%	Democratic hold
District 108	12,282	24.27%	37,357	73.81%	972	1.92%	50,611	100.00%	Republican hold
District 109	23,589	100.00%	-	-	-	-	23,589	100.00%	Democratic hold
District 110	26,899	92.91%	-	-	2,053	7.09%	28,952	100.00%	Democratic hold
District 111	24,761	100.00%	-	-	-	-	24,761	100.00%	Democratic hold
District 112	-	-	28,493	100.00%	-	-	28,493	100.00%	Republican hold
District 113	-	-	27,414	100.00%	-	-	27,414	100.00%	Republican hold
District 114	-	-	31,172	88.34%	4,116	11.66%	35,288	100.00%	Republican hold
District 115	18,276	100.00%	-	-	-	-	18,276	100.00%	Democratic hold
District 116	17,858	70.15%	7,598	29.85%	-	-	25,456	100.00%	Democratic hold
District 117	15,313	100.00%	-	-	-	-	15,313	100.00%	Democratic hold
District 118	18,294	100.00%	-	-	-	-	18,294	100.00%	Democratic hold
District 119	20,556	100.00%	-	-	-	-	20,556	100.00%	Democratic hold
District 120	19,393	98.25%	-	-	345	1.75%	19,738	100.00%	Democratic hold
District 121	14,359	33.77%	28,161	66.23%	-	-	42,520	100.00%	Republican hold
District 122	-	-	40,113	100.00%	-	-	40,113	100.00%	Republican hold
District 123	-	-	36,908	100.00%	-	-	36,908	100.00%	Republican hold
District 124	22,083	100.00%	-	-	-	-	22,083	100.00%	Democratic hold
District 125	17,734	61.12%	11,282	38.88%	-	-	29,016	100.00%	Democratic hold
District 126	-	-	38,398	100.00%	-	-	38,398	100.00%	Republican hold
District 127	-	-	32,464	100.00%	-	-	32,464	100.00%	Republican hold
District 128	15,989	100.00%	-	-	-	-	15,989	100.00%	Democratic hold
District 129	-	-	35,097	100.00%	-	-	35,097	100.00%	Republican hold
District 130	-	-	40,078	100.00%	-	-	40,078	100.00%	Republican hold
District 131	22,492	100.00%	-	-	-	-	22,492	100.00%	Democratic hold
District 132	24,242	63.88%	13,705	36.12%	-	-	37,947	100.00%	Democratic hold
District 133	-	-	34,615	100.00%	-	-	34,615	100.00%	Republican hold
District 134	-	-	22,048	100.00%	-	-	22,048	100.00%	Republican hold
District 135	-	-	32,580	100.00%	-	-	32,580	100.00%	Republican hold
District 136	-	-	36,205	92.42%	2,969	7.58%	39,174	100.00%	Republican hold
District 137	17,868	64.73%	9,737	35.27%	-	-	27,605	100.00%	Democratic hold
District 138	14,548	51.01%	13,971	48.99%	-	-	28,519	100.00%	Democratic hold
District 139	17,194	100.00%	-	-	-	-	17,194	100.00%	Democratic hold
District 140	12,153	100.00%	-	-	-	-	12,153	100.00%	Democratic hold
District 141	23,187	100.00%	-	-	-	-	23,187	100.00%	Democratic hold
District 142	21,397	100.00%	-	-	-	-	21,397	100.00%	Democratic hold
District 143	13,255	72.16%	5,113	27.84%	-	-	18,368	100.00%	Democratic hold
District 144	10,860	36.17%	18,372	61.19%	794	2.64%	30,026	100.00%	Republican hold
District 145	11,186	70.86%	4,601	29.14%	-	-	15,787	100.00%	Democratic hold
District 146	24,817	72.98%	9,189	27.02%	-	-	34,006	100.00%	Democratic hold
District 147	19,425	100.00%	-	-	-	-	19,425	100.00%	Democratic hold
District 148	14,648	100.00%	-	-	-	-	14,648	100.00%	Democratic hold
District 149	-	-	19,119	81.62%	4,306	18.38%	23,425	100.00%	Republican hold
District 150	-	-	30,419	100.00%	-	-	30,419	100.00%	Republican hold
Total	2,015,951	44.18%	2,502,499	54,84%	44,660	0.98%	4,563,110	100.00%	
