= Malik Shabazz (disambiguation) =

el-Hajj Malik el-Shabazz (1925–1965) was an African-American human rights activist also known as Malcolm X and Malcolm Little.

Malik Shabazz may also refer to:

- Mike Tyson (born 1966), boxer who reportedly adopted the name "Malik Shabazz" following his conversion to Islam
- Malik Zulu Shabazz, attorney former chairman of the New Black Panther Party
- R-Truth (born 1972), wrestler who used the ring name K. Malik Shabaz
