= New Panther Vanguard Movement =

- Chairperson: B. Kwaku Duren
- Founders: B. Kwaku Duren; Shareef Abdullah; Charles "Boko" Freeman
- Founded: October 15, 1994
- Dissolved: 2002(?)
- Ideology: Anti-Imperialism; Anti-Racism; Anti-capitalism; Intercommunalism; Wealth redistribution
- Colors: Black

The New Panther Vanguard Movement (NPVM), originally known as the New African American Vanguard Movement (NAAVM) was created in South Central Los Angeles in 1994 as a response to the Los Angeles riots of 1992. Former members of the Black Panther Party and other community activists came together after the riots and shared their frustration with the lack of leadership in the Black community. After various dialogues, they decided to create a grassroots organization that would reflect the vision and community spirit of the Black Panther Party.

== Background and History ==
In 1989, Huey P. Newton, one of the founders of the Black Panther Party, was murdered. His death led to renewed interest in the Black Panther Party and sparked a discussion about the legacy of the party. This was particularly true in California, as the birthplace of the party had been in Oakland and cities such as Oakland and Los Angeles had been key strongholds for the party during its existence. In the early 1990s, racial tensions in America, and particularly in California, were running especially high. Events in 1992 such as the Death of Latasha Harlins and the Rodney King beating had put California's racial divide firmly in the spotlight, and directly contributed to the Los Angeles riots of 1992. Later the same year, Spike Lee's biopic of Malcolm X was released, also contributing to a discussion around race in America and the role of African-Americans in American society at this time. Further compounding racial tensions in this period were the Murders of Nicole Brown and Ron Goldman and the subsequent trial of OJ Simpson, which began in mid-1994.

Emerging out of this came the New African American Vanguard Movement (NAAVM). Formed on October 15, 1994, in South Central Los Angeles, the organisation was founded by local black community organisers, including a number of former LA Chapter members of the Black Panther Party such as B. Kwaku Duren. The group directly cited the 1992 Riots and perceived lack of organisation with the African-American community in LA as the motivation for their creation. The group drew direct inspiration from the Black Panther Party of the 1960s and mirrored some of its aspects, adopting militant attire, creating their own version of the BPP's Ten-Point Program, and producing their own version of The Black Panther newspaper.

By 1996, the organisation had adopted "Intercommunalism" as their ideology, the communist theory formulated by Huey P. Newton, and were campaigning for the payment of reparations to African-Americans. Following a summit with members of the New Black Panther Party on April 19, 1997, the New African American Vanguard Movement agreed to formally change their name to the New Panther Vanguard Movement. The two groups endeavoured to build towards a national Black Panther movement by working with other "Panther-like" groups and sought to become more uniform in their practices and ideology. Both groups sought to meet with another "Panther-like" group operating in Milwaukee, calling themselves the Black Panther Militia, however that group expressed no interest at the time (although they did, in fact, merge into the New Black Panther Party in 1998). Instead, the two Panther groups turned towards New York City, where the "Black Panther Collective" was operating. A formal meeting was held, but attempts to bring them into the coalition never came to fruition as the New York group collapsed and dissolved with 6 months of the original meeting.

New Panther Vanguard Movement was folded in 2002 after a "suspicious" fire broke out in their main headquarters in Los Angeles and destroyed their office. Internal disputes are also cited as leading to their demise.
