= Quanell X =

American black nationalist leader (born 1970)

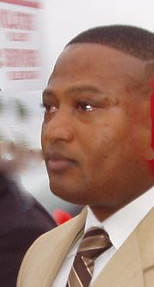
- Quanell X at Joe Horn protest, December 2, 2007
- Born: Quanell Ralph Evans; December 7, 1970 (age 55); Los Angeles, California, U.S.
- Occupation: Activist.
- Organization(s): Nation of Islam, New Black Panther Nation

Quanell X (Quanell Abdul Farrakhan; born Quanell Ralph Evans; December 7, 1970) is an American activist and leader of the New Black Panther Nation in Houston, Texas.

== Early life ==
Quanell Ralph Evans was born in Los Angeles, California in 1970. Both his mother and father were members of the Nation of Islam (a non-muslim movement) . After his parents divorced, Evans moved to Houston where he lived with his grandmother, mother and younger brother in the South Acres neighborhood and attended Worthing High School.

== Career ==
In September 1990, after listening to Louis Farrakhan at the Sam Houston Coliseum, Evans decided to join the Nation of Islam and became a student of Farrakhan. Evans, who would later be more commonly known by his pseudonym, Quanell X, was recognised by his peers for his intellect, and he was later chosen to be a spokesman for the organization.

In July 1992, Quanell X found his brother Quinten Evans dead in his apartment. Quinten and three other people were victims of a homicide in Houston, Texas. In August 2009, three incarcerated men were charged with capital murder in the killings. It was around the same time that Quanell X met State Representative Ron Wilson (D-Houston) and was offered a job working for Representative Wilson as an aide. He also served as a national youth minister for the Nation of Islam.

On January 28, 2008, Quanell X toured the Holocaust Museum Houston. He requested forgiveness regarding questionable comments he had made about Jews and their plight: “I seek the forgiveness of every survivor who has heard the words I've said. I did not adequately say them to make the point I was trying to get across. I can see and understand how they might be utterly paranoid (of) a person such as myself."

Before becoming the National Chairman of the New Black Panther Nation, X gave time to M.F.O.I. (Mental Freedom Obtains Independence) and the New Black Panther Party under the leadership of Khalid Abdul Muhammad who was appointed as the leader of the organization.

The People's New Black Panther Party in Houston has since split from Quanell X amid ongoing allegations that he has not delivered services to families he was paid to represent.

== Community activist ==
In 1999, Quanell X attended the trial of John William King for the 1998 dragging murder of James Byrd, Jr. He challenged Judge Joe Bob Golden's order barring demonstrations.

By 1996, Quanell X began establishing a name for himself as a civil rights activist in Houston. Jeffrey Battle worked as a bodyguard for Quanell X in Houston during the late 1990s.

In October 2002, Quanell X traveled to Portland, Oregon, to attend a court hearing for October Lewis, Battle's ex-wife. Lewis was released at the hearing but Battle was convicted of sedition, and is currently serving an 18-year prison sentence

On March 30, 2004, Quanell X took the podium at a Houston City Council meeting and demanded that reparations for slavery be added to the council agenda, which had previously been denied by mayor Bill White. The exchange escalated enough that the Houston Police department was called and Quanell X was escorted from the chamber.

In June 2004, Quanell X was charged with evading arrest in a motor vehicle, which was later dismissed on appeal and the record was expunged with a letter of apology from the Houston Police Department. He was on the phone with a Houston Police Department assistant police chief (Charles R. McClelland – HPD chief 2010–2016) when arranging the surrender of cop shooter Derrick Forney. The arrest received backlash with accusations of unfairness within the criminal justice system.

Quanell X is credited with bringing closure to the March 2007 investigation murder of Texas A&M University student Tynesha Stewart He was the only person who was able to get a confession from Timothy Wayne Shepherd, the suspect in the murder. He also criticized the Harris County sheriff's decision not to search for Stewart's body in a Humble, Texas, area landfill. Shepherd made a full confession to Quanell X and Stewart's body was later discovered to be unrecoverable due to the suspect's burning of her remains in two barbecue pits.

In 2022, a Houston Chronicle investigation, including hundreds of court documents and copies of contracts and cashed checks, found that Quanell X repeatedly accepted cash in exchange for advocacy but then didn’t fulfill the promises he made.

=== Joe Horn protest ===
Quanell X led a rally in front of the Pasadena, Texas, home of Joe Horn on December 2, 2007. Horn had shot and killed two men, Hernando Riascos Torres (AKA Miguel Antonio DeJesus) and Diego Ortiz, illegal immigrants and members of a burglary and fake ID ring from Colombia. The pair had broken into a neighbor's house. Horn, against repeated requests of the 911 operator not to confront the burglars, exited his home to confront them. On the 911 tapes Horn exclaims, "Move, and you're dead", followed by three shotgun blasts.

Quanell X, who thought the shootings may have been racially motivated, approached Horn's house to speak to the media. There were several hundred counter-protesters present as well. The crowd of counter-protesters included bikers revving their motorcycles, many of them chanting, "USA", "Go home", and "We love our country; what do you love?" while waving placards, Texas flags, and US flags. Quanell X, while using a bullhorn, could not be heard over the noise. After more supporters arrived, the counter-protests continued and riot police were readied in case of violence between the two groups. On June 25, 2008, the case was sent to a grand jury to decide whether or not Horn should go to trial. On June 30, 2008, Horn was cleared by a Harris County grand jury in the deaths of Ortiz and Diego after two weeks of testimony. Quanell X eventually made a speech on another street away from Horn's house. The speech included chants of "black power" and the exhortation for blacks to realize that "white laws" were written to protect white people especially when committing crimes against black and brown people.

=== 2008 to 2010 ===
On January 24, 2008, Quanell X called for Chuck Rosenthal's resignation following the email scandal that showed that he had sent and received racist messages while working in his official capacity. Quanell X organized a rally to take place outside the county courthouse. In October 2008, KTRK-TV reported that Quanell X received $20,000 (~$29,907 in 2025) for "consultation fees" to facilitate protests on their behalf to bring awareness to the public and to generate publicity during the related Iberra trial.

After being in police custody for several days, murder suspect Randy Sylvester Sr. would only confess to Quanell X and revealed the location of his missing children. Initially, Quanell X gave Sylvester the benefit of the doubt, but he was convinced otherwise when he went with Pasadena police to Sylvester’s "dog house" (an apartment he maintained separately from his family's where Sylvester engaged in drugs and pornography.) Quanell X would not go into detail, but other things he learned in that apartment changed his mind about Sylvester. Quanell X convinced the suspect to "Do the right thing". With the Pasadena Police on site, Sylvester led Quanell X to a location just outside of Pasadena, Texas, in Houston, where the charred remains of the children were located.

=== After 2010 ===
In March 2011 Quanell X traveled to Cleveland, Texas, after the rape of an 11-year old Hispanic girl by 18 African American men, questioning why the girl did not do enough to stop the attack and placing some blame on the victim's parents.

On August 1, 2011, Quanell X pleaded with the residents of inner city neighborhoods to stop the "No Snitching" policy that institutes a bias of those who provide information to police after a series of crimes and murders had plagued the Third Ward area in recent weeks. He said, "The no-snitch policy does not work when you are forcing [sic] our elders and our women and our children live like hostages."

In July 2013, Quanell X and others protested and effectively blocked Texas State Highway 288 over the acquittal in the shooting death of Trayvon Martin. Not only did protesters successfully shut down Highway 288 but a large protest was also held in the affluent River Oaks neighborhood. Reports varied as to whether there were just under 1,000, or more than 1,000 people attending the River Oaks demonstration and a counter-demonstration drew an estimated crowd of 80 people. Despite potential threats of violence, both sides kept the peace.

=== 2023 ===
In July 2023, Quanell X, along with local Houston reporter Grizzy Hood News, made national headlines after being involved in the case of Rudy Farias, a Houston man who went missing as a teenager in March 2015 and reappeared in 2023. Quanell X held a press conference, criticizing what he saw as a lack of immediate response by the Houston Police Department to the case.

== See also ==
- History of African-Americans in Houston
