= 2010 gang rapes in Cleveland, Texas =

Acts of sexual violence in the US

- Location: Cleveland, Liberty County, Texas, United States

The 2010 gang rapes in Cleveland, Texas were a series of acts of sexual violence committed by a group of adult men and teenage boys on an underage girl in the town of Cleveland, in Texas, United States.

The victim was an 11-year-old middle school student of Mexican descent. On 29 November, 2010, a cell phone video clip with images of her rape circulated in the cafeteria of Cleveland's high school. Some of the viewers recognized the girl. A friend of the girl told a teacher what he had seen in the cell-phone video, and the police were alerted.

== Background ==
The victim was the 11-year-old daughter of Mexican immigrants, living in Cleveland, Texas, a "timber town" of about 9,000 people in the Greater Houston metropolitan area and Liberty County. Her father was a former construction worker, unemployed at the time for a year and a half because of a back injury, while her mother was working making change in a slot game room.

The perpetrators, all of African-American descent, included students at the local high school, two of whom were members of the basketball team and one the son of a school-board member, and people with criminal records, from selling drugs to robbery and, in one case, manslaughter. They ranged from middle schoolers to one 27-year-old, at the time of the crime.

== Discovery ==
On 29 November 2010, the Monday after Thanksgiving Day, a cell phone video clip with images of the rape of a young female circulated in the cafeteria of Cleveland's high school. Some viewers recognized the girl as a 6th grader from the middle school next door. A friend of the girl told a teacher what he had seen in the cell-phone video, as a school-district spokeswoman subsequently stated, and the police were alerted.

== Investigation ==
Police investigators identified and contacted the girl, whereupon she said that, over the 2010 Thanksgiving holiday break, she was raped by a group of young men first at a house and then in a mobile home. According to a search warrant affidavit obtained by the media, police determined the video clip was recorded inside an abandoned mobile home on the city's northern outskirts, next to a Baptist church. According to the subsequent, criminal indictments, the girl was assaulted on four occasions: the first in September, followed by three more during the fall of 2010. In January 2011, she was removed by social workers from her parents' home and taken to foster care.

The investigation stirred racial tensions on account of the defendants all being African-Americans and the girl Hispanic, in both the town and nationwide. The case was covered nationwide in the US and also abroad.

On Monday 4 April 2011, nineteen defendants appeared in the court of Liberty County district judge Mark Morefield for their arraignment hearing, with six of them pleading "not guilty."

== Support for the accused ==
The New York Times first report, written by journalist James C. McKinley Jr., focused on the impact of the crime on the Cleveland community, (Note: On the 8 March NYT article, a hospital worker, who said she knew several of the defendants, was quoted: “It's just destroyed our community. These boys have to live with this the rest of their lives.” Also quoted was the spokeswoman for the Cleveland Independent School District: “It's devastating, and it's really tearing our community apart. I really wish that this could end in a better light.” There were also quotes from local people who questioned the attitude of the victim's family, such as a neighbor of her parents: "Where was her mother? What was her mother thinking?”) which was criticized for being sympathetic toward the accused. The newspaper dispatched its reporter back to Cleveland and published a self-critical article of its reporting. (Note: The 11 March NYT article stated: "The outrage [against the previous NYT report] is understandable. The story dealt with a hideous crime but addressed concerns about the ruined lives of the perpetrators without acknowledging the obvious: concern for the victim. While the story appeared to focus on the community's reaction to the crime, it was not enough to simply report that the community is principally concerned about the boys and men involved – as this story seems to do. If indeed that is the only sentiment to be found in this community...it becomes important to report... as well [of] voices of professional authorities or dissenting community members who will at least address, and not ignore, the plight of the young girl involved.")

Quanell X, community leader/activist and head of the New Black Panther Nation, alleged the girl did not do enough to stop the assailants and partially blamed the victim's parents stating "This rape did not happen in one night, it did not happen in two days. This was going on for a protracted period of time. So I ask the question: If this young girl did not live in that neighborhood, at 11 years of age how is that child in that community experiencing so much sex with so many African-American men? Where was the mother? Where was the father?" He also disputed the rape claims since, as he put it, the girl never actually yelled the word "rape" during the assault and did not make an "outcry" until after footage of the assault surfaced. (Note: According to the Houston Press 2014 report, Quanell X claimed the investigation into the rape was being "run by the KKK" and stated to the African American community of the town: "We do not want someone with a malicious, racist motive to rid your community of an entire generation of black men.") The media reported that the audience "cheered and hollered in agreement."

== Trials ==
In Texas, sexual assault against a person under 17 years of age is a second degree felony, and aggravated sexual assault a first degree felony. Eventually, 21 people were charged with crimes related to the gang rape. Only two adult males requested trials; one received a 99-year prison sentence, while the other was sentenced to life without parole. Eleven other adult males pleaded guilty to the charges against them and received 15-year sentences in exchange. All seven juveniles entered guilty pleas and received seven-year probated prison-sentences. The twenty-first and last defendant pleaded guilty after a year-long investigation whereby a DNA specimen identified him as being at the crime scene. The defendant received a reduced seven-year sentence in exchange for pleading guilty to indecently exposing himself to a child. All defendants sentenced to prison would be registered as sex offenders for 10 years after completing the sentence.

== Aftermath ==
When the investigation started, the victim's family moved to another town after police detectives told the parents that they were in danger, while the girl who was raped was placed by the Child Protective Services in the care of the Girls' Haven in Beaumont, Texas. In December 2011, she ran away from the residential facility and was "on the streets for about a week," as the Jefferson County prosecutor stated. He revealed that, at some point, she met a 30-year-old male with a prior conviction as a drug dealer in Fort Bend County, who subsequently assaulted her at his apartment in Beaumont. The assailant was arrested and pleaded guilty in September 2012 to aggravated sexual assault of a child in exchange for deferred probation. In 2013, the girl revealed she was pregnant, allegedly from her "15-year-old boyfriend," and that they would keep the baby.

== See also ==
- Rape statistics
- Rape culture
- Child sexual abuse
- Causes of sexual violence
- Victim blaming
- Laws regarding child sexual abuse
- Laws regarding rape
- Rape in the United States
- Child abuse in the United States
