= Joe Horn shooting controversy =

2007 incident in Pasadena, Texas, United States

- Date: November 14, 2007; 18 years ago
- Time: (CST; UTC−06:00)
- Location: Pasadena, Texas, U.S.
- Type: Shooting
- Deaths: 2

The Joe Horn shooting controversy occurred on November 14, 2007, in Pasadena, Texas, United States, when local resident Joe Horn shot and killed two burglars outside his neighbor's home. Recordings of Horn's exchange with emergency dispatch indicated that he was asked 14 times not to interfere with the burglary, because police would soon be on scene. The shootings resulted in debates regarding self-defense, castle doctrine laws, and Texas laws relating to use of deadly force to prevent or stop property crimes. The undocumented status of both burglars was highlighted because of the U.S. border controversy. On June 30, 2008, Horn was cleared by a grand jury in the Pasadena shootings.

== Shooting ==
On November 14, 2007, Joe Horn, 61, spotted two black men breaking into his next-door neighbor's home in Pasadena, Texas. He called 911 to summon police to the scene. While on the phone with emergency dispatch, Horn stated that he had the right to use deadly force to defend property, referring to a law (Texas Penal Code §§ 9.41, 9.42, and 9.43) which justified the use of deadly force to protect Horn's home. Horn exited his home with his shotgun, while the 911 operator tried to dissuade him from that action several times. On the 911 tape, he is heard confronting the suspects, saying, "Move, and you're dead", immediately followed by the sound of a shotgun blast, followed by two more. Following the shootings Horn told the 911 operator, "They came in the front yard with me, man, I had no choice!"

Police initially identified the dead men in Horn's yard as 38-year-old Miguel Antonio DeJesus and 30-year-old Diego Ortiz, both residents of Houston. However, DeJesus was actually an alias of an individual named Hernando Riascos Torres. Torres and Ortiz were carrying a sack with cash and jewelry taken from the home of Horn's next-door neighbor. Both had criminal convictions in Colombia and had been convicted on drug trafficking charges. Police found a Puerto Rican man's identification card on Ortiz. Torres had three identification cards from Colombia, Puerto Rico, and the Dominican Republic, and had been previously sent to prison for dealing cocaine. Torres had been deported in 1999.

An unidentified plainclothes police detective responding to the 911 call arrived at the scene before the shooting, and witnessed the escalation and shootings while remaining in his car. His report on the incident indicated that one of the men who was killed "received gunfire from the rear". Police Captain A.H.Corbett, a spokesman for the Pasadena Police Department, stated that the two men ignored Horn's order to freeze and that one of the suspects ran towards Horn before angling away from him and toward the street when they were shot in the back. The medical examiner's report could not specify whether they were shot in the back due to the ballistics of the shotgun wound. Pasadena police confirmed the two men were shot after they ventured into Horn's front yard. Horn was not arrested.

The incident touched off protests, led by Quanell X, leader of the Houston chapter of the New Black Panther Party (NBPP) that were met by counter-protests from Horn's neighbors and other supporters.

=== 911 call transcript ===
One vital piece of evidence were segments of Horn's 911 calls which could have possibly incriminated Horn or shown his innocence. The most scrutinized segment is presented below:

Horn: "I've got a shotgun; do you want me to stop them?"

Pasadena emergency operator: "Nope. Don't do that. Ain't no property worth shooting somebody over, O.K.?"

Horn: "But hurry up, man. Catch these guys will you? Cause, I ain't going to let them go." (Horn then said he would get his shotgun.)

Operator: "No, no."

Horn: "I can't take a chance of getting killed over this, O.K.? I'm going to shoot."

(The operator tells him not to go out with a gun because officers would be arriving.)

Horn: "I understand that O.K. But I have a right to protect myself too, sir, and you understand that ... and the laws have been changed in this country since September the first [2007], and you know it and I know it. I have a right to protect myself. A shotgun is a legal weapon, it's not an illegal weapon."

Operator: "You're going to get yourself shot if you go outside that house with a gun."

Horn: "You wanna make a bet?"

Horn: "I'm gonna kill 'em"

Horn: "Well here it goes, buddy. You hear the shotgun clicking and I'm going."

Horn, to burglars: "Move, you're dead."

(There were two quick gunshots, then a third.)

Horn, to dispatcher: "I had no choice. They came in the front yard with me, man. I had no choice."

The 911 call ended about 80 seconds after the shots were fired, when officers arrived on the scene.

== Joe Horn ==
Joe Horn took an early retirement from AT&T and moved in with his daughter, Rhonda, and her husband in Kentucky. After his daughter was widowed in 1998 the remainder of the family moved to Houston and Horn went back to work so his daughter could take care of the children. When Rhonda remarried, she and her new husband purchased a home and asked Horn to move in. In 2003, he accepted and moved in once more. A Houston native, Horn graduated from Sam Houston High School in 1964. He went to work as a 7-Eleven store clerk immediately after high school. Two years afterwards, he started work in the communications industry, eventually working his way up to a computer program manager for AT&T before retiring in 2003. He was proficient with guns for hunting but had lost interest in hunting years before the fateful shootings.

== Aftermath ==
=== Death threat ===
A death threat was made anonymously to the district attorney in which the following was said: "Don't worry about my name. But what you better do, you better indict Joe Horn, and you better find him guilty. Because if you don't, somebody is gonna kill him on the outside, and if he goes to prison he's gonna get killed on the inside. It's as simple as that. They waiting on him in prison, and we're waiting on him on the outside. We gonna kill that mother fucker. Bye."

=== Grand jury ===
On June 30, 2008 a Harris County grand jury cleared Horn by issuing a no bill after two weeks of testimony.

==== Reaction ====
Black activist Quanell X said he was meeting with civil attorneys to discuss the next legal move. He said he planned to lobby lawmakers to change the Castle Doctrine, which he believes is racially motivated. He went on to say, "This was a wild and out-of-control Western-thinking, gun-toting man who saw the opportunity to be judge, jury and executioner, and Harris County let him get away with it. But we're not going to let him get away with it."

On a Sunday in early December 2007, Quanell X and dozens of members of the group New Black Panther Party planned a march through Pasadena, Texas to protest.

Joseph Gutheinz, a Houston attorney and member of the National Republican Lawyers Association, said: "I wonder if Joe Horn were black if he would be free tonight or in the Harris County Jail." Speaking on the Harris County Grand Jury system, Gutheinz said: "It's a sea of white faces that doesn't look anything like the county."

=== National reactions ===
The Glenn Beck Program had conditionally taken up Horn's defense, but allowed that "property is worth killing over."

== See also ==
- Castle doctrine
- Tony Martin (farmer)
