= Black Panther Militia =

Militant Black Power organization

- Leader: Michael McGee
- Founded: April 1990
- Dissolved: c. 1998
- Merged into: New Black Panther Party
- Country: United States
- Active regions: Milwaukee, Wisconsin
- Ideology: Black Power
- Status: Defunct

The Black Panther Militia (BPM) was a militant Black Power organization and militia based in Milwaukee, Wisconsin, in the United States during the 1990s. The group was created by a former member of the Black Panther Party and sitting alderman Michael McGee in 1990 and considered itself a successor to the Milwaukee chapter of the Black Panther Party that existed in the early 1970s. McGee, as leader of the group, drew on militaristic outlook and tactics used by the Black Panther Party to draw attention to issues facing the black community in Milwaukee; however, he was often criticized for grandstanding and alienating Milwaukee's white community, including former allies such as Mayor John Norquist, with the use of threats of interracial violence. The Black Panther Militia was eventually absorbed by the New Black Panther Party by 1998, as that group sought to expand its influence while McGee stood back from politics.

== Background ==
In 1989 the University of Chicago produced a study that listed Milwaukee as one of five "hypersegregated" cities in the United States, with black and white residents of the city divided along stark north–south lines. The study also suggested that Milwaukee's black families had the lowest median income among US cities of comparable size and that black unemployment in Milwaukee was at 18%, six times that of the city's white population. The city was suffering economically as its manufacturing base rapidly declined and 33% of the city's high paying jobs were lost during the 1980s. The study also stated that Milwaukee's homicide rate had doubled over three years and that 75% of the victims were black. Concurrent to all this was the serial killing spree of Jeffrey Dahmer, who was not arrested until 1991; many black residents of Milwaukee later claimed he could have been captured sooner if the local police force had taken reports from black residents more seriously.

Michael McGee had been an elected representative in Milwaukee since 1984 (as a member of the Common Council), and by 1987 was highly concerned about the rapidly deteriorating conditions of Milwaukee's black residents. He became more radical and outspoken in his politics and organized protests by black residents about their conditions. By 1990 he had become an alderman and it was during this time he announced the formation of a "Black Panther Militia".

== Organization history ==
McGee announced the formation of the Black Panther Militia in April 1990, and stated that unless the city invested $100 million into an inner-city jobs program, himself and the militia would promote violence in the black community and that if no significant improvement was made for the black community in Milwaukee by 1995, they would begin "urban guerrilla warfare". The white establishment in Milwaukee was shocked, and Mayor John Norquist, who had previously enjoyed good relations with McGee, demanded his resignation. However, McGee had no intention of backing down and continued forward in his radical direction. McGee's remarks had drawn national attention and from that point enjoyed a considerable public profile. For example, in 1990 McGee and the militia were profiled by CBS during an episode of 60 Minutes.

Not long after McGee's announcement, the Black Panther Militia claimed to have 500 young black men and women as members, of whom 60 were students from the University of Wisconsin–Madison. Subsequently, the Black Panther Militia mirrored the actions of the Black Panther Party; McGee began to refer to himself as "commander" and dressed in military-esque attire, the militia announced they had a Ten-Point Program, began providing free social services such as Free Breakfast for Children and started their own newspaper entitled Panther Spirit, in the same vein as the Black Panther newspaper.

During one period in 1990, McGee informed authorities that in response to Usinger's sausage company opposed renaming a street in Milwaukee to Dr. Martin Luther King Jr. Drive, a group of black militants had poisoned some of their products. In response, Usinger's issued a mass recall but it was later discovered the entire affair was a hoax by McGee. He was censured by the Milwaukee Common Council in response.

In 1992, McGee was facing re-election as alderman and faced a difficult path to retain his office. The city had redrawn the lines of his district and split much of his black voting base while including more white voters. In response, in January 1992 McGee threatened to "launch terrorist warfare" by the Black Panther Militia unless he was re-elected. However, by February, he appeared before the Common Council in business attire and said he was willing to work with the system. The election was held in April and McGee lost his seat to Sgt. George Butler, a black police officer endorsed by Mayor Norquest.

McGee continued to lead the Black Panther Militia. In 1992 the BPM announced they had created two additional chapters, one in Indianapolis, Indiana, and one in Dallas, Texas. In 1994 McGee and the BPM were still pressing its threat to begin warfare on the United States in 1995 unless material conditions for black residents of Milwaukee improved.

By the late 1990s, the Black Panther Militia had been absorbed into the New Black Panther Party, which by 1998 was attempting to become a national organization and was incorporating other "Panther-like" groups such as the New Panther Vanguard Movement out of Los Angeles.
