= Farrah Gray =

American businessman

Farrah Gray (born Farrakhan Khalid Muhammad; September 9, 1984) is an American businessman, investor, author, columnist, and motivational speaker.

Gray was raised on Chicago's South side. He is the son of the late black nationalist leader Khalid Abdul Muhammad. He began his entrepreneurial career at the age of six selling homemade lotion and hand-painted rocks door-to-door. He is a Christian .

== Honors ==
- The Network Journal Under-Forty Class Award (2008)
- The Urban Business Roundtable's Top 40 Game-Changers (2010)
- Famous Black Entrepreneurs list (#5)
- Trumpet Award (2010)

== Books ==
Title	Co-authors	Year	Publisher	ISBN
Reallionaire: Nine Steps of Becoming Rich on the Inside Out	Fran Harris	2005	HCI	ISBN 0-7573-0224-6 / ISBN 978-0-7573-0224-4
Get Real, Get Rich		2007	Dutton	ISBN 0-525-95044-3 / ISBN 978-0-525-95044-8
The Truth Shall Make You Rich: The New Road Map to Radical Prosperity		2009	Plume	ISBN 0-452-29017-1 / ISBN 978-0-452-29017-4
Strong Women Only Intimidate Weak Men		2014		
