= B. Kwaku Duren =

American lawyer

- Born: April 14, 1943 (age 83); Beckley, West Virginia, U.S.
- Education: People's College of Law (JD)
- Occupation: Attorney
- Political party: Black Panther Party; Peace and Freedom Party; New Panther Vanguard Movement
- Spouse: Married four times
- Children: Seth, Andrea, Kwamé, Sarika

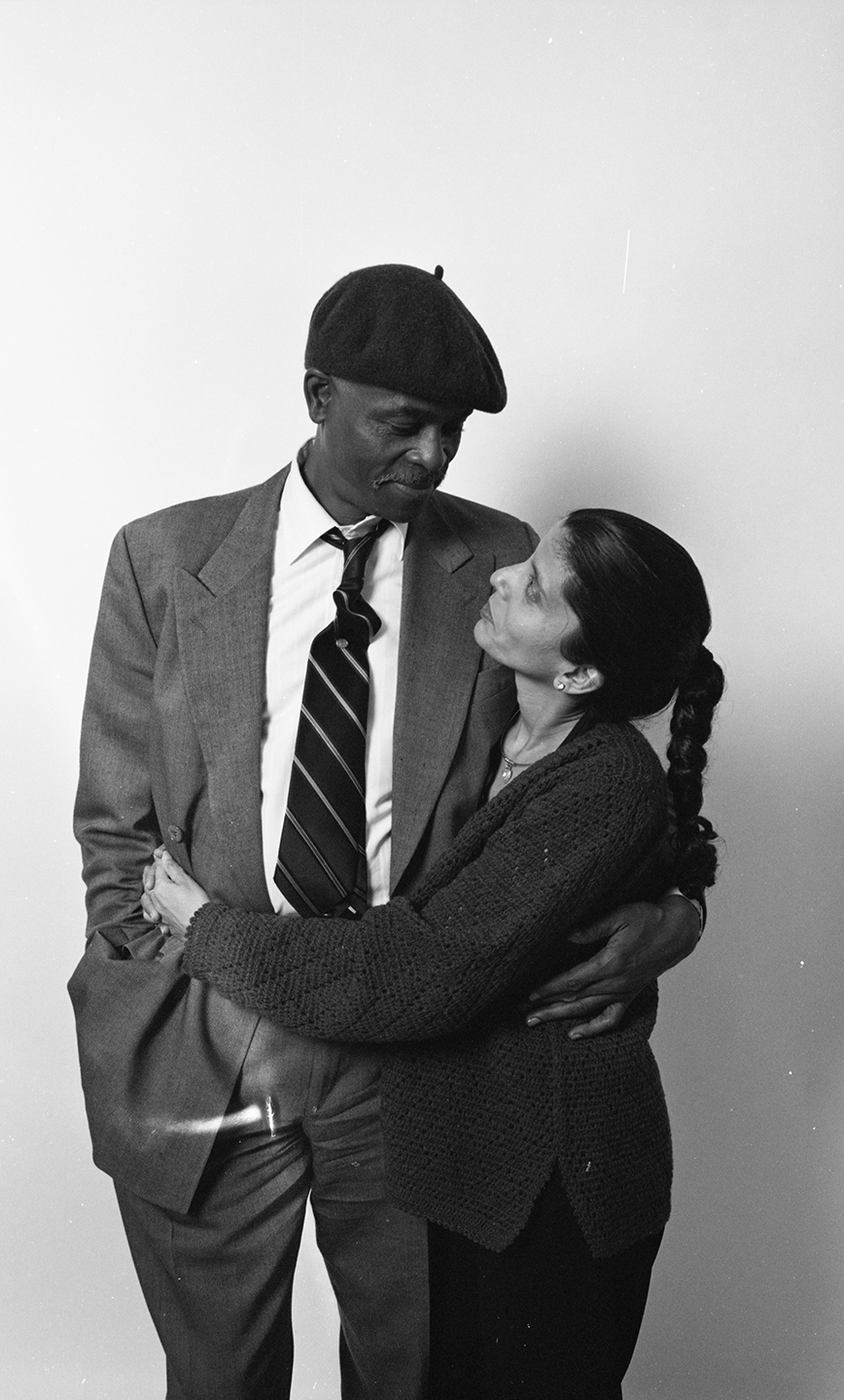
Portrait of B. Kwaku Duren and former spouse Neelam Sharma, 2000.

B. Kwaku Duren (born April 14, 1943; a.k.a., Robert Donaldson Duren and Bob D. Duren) is an American former lawyer, educator, writer, editor, Black Panther, long-time social, political and community activist; and a former convict who now lives and practices law in South Central Los Angeles. He has run for the United States Congress three times and once for Vice President of the United States. As a young man, he spent nearly five years in California prisons for armed robbery. He began reading extensively and taking college classes while incarcerated and after his parole in the fall of 1970, he founded and chaired the National Poor People's Congress. A couple of years later, he and his younger sister, Betty Scott, along with Mary Blackburn and other community activists, founded an alternative school – the Intercommunal Youth Institute (1972–1975) – in Long Beach, California.

In the wake of the shooting death of his sister by a California Highway Patrol officer during a routine traffic stop, Duren helped found and was a co-chair of the Coalition Against Police Abuse (CAPA) from 1975 to 1977. From 1976 to 1981 he was the Coordinator of the Southern California Chapter of the Black Panther Party (SCC/BPP). From 1979 until 1991 he worked for the Los Angeles Legal Aid Foundation, beginning as a Community Outreach Worker; later, as a paralegal and attorney; he was one of the founding members and first president of the Union of Legal Services Workers of Los Angeles (AFL-CIO/UAW).

Duren attended law school at the Peoples College of Law in Los Angeles. He graduated in fall of 1989 and was admitted to the California State Bar on August 8, 1990. He has worked as a “people’s” lawyer and community activist in South Central Los Angeles ever since.

A founding member of Community Services Unlimited, Inc., he was its executive director from 1977 to 2008. As Chairman of the New Panther Vanguard Movement – since 1994 – Duren was co-editor-in-chief, with his ex-wife, Neelam Sharma, of The Black Panther International News Service, a quarterly newspaper published in Los Angeles from 1995 to 2001.

== Early life ==
B. Kwaku Duren was born in Beckley, West Virginia, to William Preston “Brack” Duren and Willie Wade Bennett. Duren is the only son in a family of four children. His father worked as a miner, a prizefighter, and a steel mill worker.

In 1959, Duren's mother relocated from Cleveland to Long Beach, California. Her husband followed his family to Long Beach shortly thereafter. In 1960, Brack Duren was arrested in a house raid by the FBI and charged with committing armed robberies of illegal gambling joints in Cleveland, which he had done after being injured and unable to find work. He was extradited to Ohio where he served many years in Chillicothe Correctional Institution before becoming a jailhouse lawyer, doing research on his own case (with the help of his eldest daughter, Joyce), appealing, and ultimately winning his release on a technicality. He rejoined and remarried his wife after his release from prison and lived the remainder of his life in Long Beach.

At the age of 17 years, Kwaku Duren was arrested for breaking and entering into a television shop. He served six months in an L.A. county jail facility before being placed on probation. Following his release he worked in a pool hall in Long Beach, sold drugs, and, with a partner, committed a series of convenience-store holdups over several years. In spring of 1966, he was arrested for sticking up a cab driver, convicted, and sentenced to five years to life. He spent four-and-a-half years in Chino and Soledad prisons.

During his three-and-a-half years in Soledad, a black counselor introduced Duren to the writings of the African American historian and sociologist W.E.B. Du Bois – especially The World and Africa. Even before his slide into criminality, Duren had been a voracious reader. He thus began an intensive study of African–American history while in prison, reading books such as The Autobiography of Malcolm X. He also read works by J. A. Rogers, Erich Fromm, Friedrich Engels, Karl Marx, and Lenin. He ordered these books through the California State Library and the UNESCO library. He enrolled in and completed classes in economics, sociology, and psychology, as well as astronomy, at San Francisco State University. He was paroled in September 1970 at the age of 27.

== The Intercommunal Youth Institute ==
Duren, his younger sister, Betty Scott (aka Betty Scott-Smith), and other community activists founded the non-profit Intercommunal Youth Institute (IYI) in Long Beach during the summer of 1973. This alternative school, a project of the Experimental Educational Institute, Inc., was organized by Duren and was modeled after the highly successful Black Panther Party community school in Oakland, California. Duren was the Institute Director and taught world history. Betty Scott was the business manager. The IYI received a certification from the state board of education and also received Title I [federal] funds.

In the summer of 1975, the Venceremos Brigade chose Duren to lead a delegation of youth to an international youth summer camp in Cuba to meet with and to discuss youth issues with other students, and to learn about the Cuban Revolution. Upon Duren's return to the U.S., the FBI and INS detained him. He was released after a lengthy interrogation about his purpose for visiting Cuba.

== Death of Betty Scott ==
On September 20, 1975, while on her way to the Monterey Jazz Festival, Betty Scott and her partner, George Smith, were pulled over at 4 a.m. in Pleasanton, California, near Oakland, reportedly for a speeding violation. Ms. Scott was driving. During the stop, two California Highway Patrol officers, Curtis Engberson and Gordon Robbins, approached the car. Engberson was young, a recent recruit to the CHP. He approached Ms. Scott on the driver's side of the vehicle; Robbins took the passenger's side.

It is disputed whether the officers had their guns drawn, which would not be routine in a traffic stop. Other details of the subsequent events are disputed as well. What is on record is that Scott was shot once in the neck by Engberson, fell into Smith's lap, and died almost instantly. The shooting occurred as a reaction by the young, nervous officer to Robbins's shout, “She’s got a gun!” Smith did keep a gun in the glove compartment, and Ms. Scott had been reaching into the compartment to produce the car's registration in response to Engberson's order to do so. However, powder burns on the victim's neck, the trajectory of the bullet, and other physical evidence, led some to conclude that the police testimony was a fabrication after the fact to diminish culpability. An Alameda County grand jury exonerated the officers, returning a verdict of justifiable homicide.

Smith, who had been in the front seat beside Scott, was charged with attempted murder of a police officer, although he did not have a gun in his possession and was in shock due to Scott's shooting. Charges against him were later dropped after a series of demonstrations organized by the Scott-Smith Defense Committee. Off-the-record testimony by another CHP officer to a member of the Duren family stated that the officer who killed Scott subsequently suffered emotional trauma as a result of his action.

Duren and his family, including Duren's first wife, Virginia Harris, and Mary Blackburn formed the Scott-Smith Committee for Justice to investigate the incident and then sued the CHP for three million dollars in a wrongful death suit. The suit was unsuccessful. The IYI eventually dissolved.

In February 1976, Duren helped create – along with former Black Panthers Michael Zinzun and Anthony Thigpenn – the Coalition Against Police Abuse (CAPA). Duren became its co-chair. The Coalition, notable for its broad-based alliance between the black and Mexican communities in L.A., had as its purpose to prevent, expose, and resist abuse and misconduct by police, and to seek legal redress for such abuse.

== Citizens Against Police Abuse ==
In 1981, Kwaku was a founding member and co-chair of the Coalition Against Police Abuse (CAPA), a multi-racial community-based organization with activists in East and Southcentral Los Angeles. He later became a lead plaintiff in the ACLU's domestic spying lawsuit against Los Angeles Police Chief Daryl Gates which sought to eliminate the LAPD's Public Disorder and Intelligence Division (PDID). CAPA, et al. vs. Gates, et al., was settled for $1.3 million and the disbanding of the Public Disorder and Intelligence Division (PDID) and the establishing of the LAPD's Anti-Terrorist Division (ATD).

== Black Panther ==
In the summer of 1976, Duren first enrolled in the Peoples College of Law in Los Angeles. Concurrently, he and some other black activists formed a political study group. He and these activists went to Oakland and met with Elaine Brown, Chairwoman of the Black Panther Party, to discuss reforming the Party in L.A.

In October, nearly a year after his sister's killing, and after meeting with members of the Central Committee of the Party, Duren officially joined the Black Panther Party. In January 1977, while LAPD helicopters circled overhead, Duren inaugurated the new office of the Southern California Chapter of the Black Panther Party (SCC/BPP) on Central Avenue in South Central. He believed that the Party had the potential for raising the consciousness of black youth and others in the continuing struggle for “people’s power.” In the summer of the same year, Huey Newton, who had co-founded the Party in 1966 with Bobby Seale, returned from political exile in Cuba.

Duren continued to work with the Party, reorganizing the Southern California Chapter, growing its membership, and carrying out its community involvement agenda. The re-established SCC under Duren's Coordinator status was always small in member numbers.

== A People's Lawyer ==
Duren began taking law classes at the Peoples College of Law (PCL) in August 1976. He dropped out about six months into the program and devoted himself to organizing around police abuse/misconduct issues, resulting in the formation of CAPA, as mentioned above, and the reopening of the SCC/BPP in 1977. In late 1979, he was hired as a Community Outreach Worker by Linda Ferguson, Director of the Watts Legal Aid Office (located at Manchester and Broadway in South Central). When a Legal Assistant opening became available about a year later, he was moved into that position; simultaneously, he took paralegal classes at the University of Southern California's Paralegal Program and received a Certificate of Completion.

Around 1981, Duren started an independent law study program with Linda Ferguson. However, his involvement with CAPA v. Gates split his focus, so he withdrew from the study program.

He returned to the formal study of law by re-enrolling in the PCL in 1985. He graduated in June 1989, received his JD degree, and took the bar for the first time in October 1989. He received confirmation that he had passed in November 1989. The California Committee of Bar Examiners delayed his admission to the state bar as the Subcommittee on Moral Fitness put his attorney application on hold. Duren wrote the State Bar's Governing Board and threatened to sue. He was then admitted and continued to work for legal aid, but as a staff attorney. Duren was sworn in by Judge Richard Paez – at the time a superior court judge who had been a former executive director of Legal Aid – in Paez’ courtroom in 1990. Paez was later appointed as a federal judge.

Duren left Legal Aid for private practice in 1991 due to political pressure from the National Legal Services Corporation in the form of heightened scrutiny of his several campaigns for political office (including running for Congress in 1982 and 1986). There was at the time, and still is, a Congressional prohibition of attorneys employed with Legal Aid running for political office (the legislation that proscribes Legal Aid attorneys running for political office was sponsored by the Republican senator from Utah, Orrin Hatch). In 1993, Duren was certified to practice law in Federal Court and in 1998 certified to practice in the Ninth Circuit Court of Appeals. He was appointed to the Superior Court Arbitration/Mediation Panel in 1997 and to the Federal Court's Settlement Officer Panel and Pilot Prisoner Mediation Program in 2000.

== New Panther Vanguard Movement ==
In 1994 Duran was a founding member and chairman of the New African American Vanguard Movement, which later became the New Panther Vanguard Movement. The organisation was mainly an attempted recreation of the original Black Panther Party but as a response to the heightened racial tensions of the early 1990s being felt in America.

== Disbarment ==
At the age of 70, on May 10, 2013, Duren was given a two-year stayed suspension from the practice of law in the state of California and placed on two years of probation with an actual 30-day suspension. He was also ordered to take the Multistate Professional Responsibility Examination and to pay restitution.

Duren stipulated that he failed to perform legal services with competence by not showing up at a hearing which led to his client's foreclosure case being dismissed. Duren also did not inform the client of significant developments in her case, failed to promptly refund $10,000 in unearned fees and failed to give her a proper accounting when she asked for a refund. He later, belatedly, returned $2,000 of the fees. In mitigation, Duren had more than 20 years of discipline-free practice prior to the misconduct, has been involved in numerous pro bono activities and cooperated with the State Bar by entering into a stipulation before trial. As part of the stipulation, Duren was ordered to pay $8,000, plus interest, to the former client.

On March 12, 2017, the Supreme Court of California disbarred Duren after he failed to participate in State Bar Court proceedings related to three counts of misconduct involving a single client matter, which led the State Bar Court to enter his default. The default meant that the court deemed admitted the factual allegations against Duren.

== Bibliography ==
- DeSantis, John. The New Untouchables. Chicago: The Noble Press, Inc. 1994.
- Donner, Frank. Protectors of Privilege: Red Squads and Police Repression in Urban America. Berkeley and Los Angeles: University of California Press, 1990.
- Duren, Joyce. My Bout with Lupus. Duren Enterprises, 1985.
- Duren, Joyce. Profiles in Black. New York: CORE Publications, 1976.
- Escobar, Edward. “The Dialectics of Repression,” in The Journal of American History, March 1993.
- Hunt, Raymond G., and Magenau, John M. Power and the Police Chief. Newbury Park, California; SAGE Publications, 1993.
- Jerger, Burr. “CHP Shoots Black Activist.” Los Angeles Free Press. October 3–9, 1975, p. 9.
- Oakland Tribune. “Woman Shot: Pulled Gun on CHP.” September 21, 1975, p. 1.
- Sharma, Neelam, and Duren, Kwaku, eds. The Black Panther International News Service. Vols. 4, 5, 6, and 7.
