= Malik Zulu Shabazz =

American attorney (born 1966)

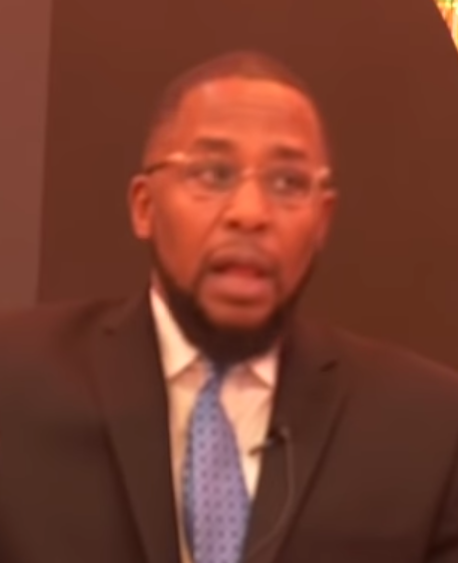
- Shabazz in 1994
- Born: Paris S. Lewis; September 7, 1966 (age 60); Los Angeles, California, U.S.
- Education: Howard University (B.A., J.D.)
- Occupations: Lawyer, political activist, lecturer

Malik Zulu Shabazz (born Paris S. Lewis on September 7, 1966) is an American attorney. He has previously served as Chairman of the New Black Panther Party, . As of 2013, he is the current National President of Black Lawyers for Justice, which he co-founded.

Shabazz announced on an October 14, 2013, online radio broadcast that he was stepping down from his leadership position in the New Black Panther Party and that Hashim Nzinga, then national chief of staff, would replace him. He is an occasional guest on television talk shows.

The Anti-Defamation League describes Shabazz as "anti-Semitic and racist" and the Southern Poverty Law Center (SPLC)'s Intelligence Project's Intelligence Report, which monitors what the SPLC considers radical right (United States) hate groups and extremists in the United States, has included Shabazz in its files since a 2002 Washington, D.C., protest at B'nai B'rith International at which Shabazz shouted: "Kill every goddamn Zionist in Israel! Goddamn little babies, goddamn old ladies! Blow up Zionist supermarkets!"

== Early life and legal career ==
Shabazz was born in 1966 as Paris Lewis and raised in Los Angeles. Shabazz says his father, James Lewis, was a Muslim who was killed when Shabazz was a child. Shabazz was raised by his mother, whom he describes as a successful businesswoman. His grandfather, who introduced him to the Nation of Islam, was also a strong influence.

Shabazz graduated from Howard University and Howard University School of Law. In 1994, Shabazz was fired from a position with then Washington D.C. Mayor Marion Barry, who criticized Shabazz for statements "regarding other people's cultural history, religion and race that do not reflect the spirit of my campaign, my personal views or my spirituality."

In 1995, while he was a law student, Shabazz ran his first unsuccessful campaign for a seat on the Council of the District of Columbia. In 1996, Shabazz founded Black Lawyers for Justice. In 1998, Shabazz was named "Young Lawyer of the Year" by the National Bar Association, the nation's leading black lawyers' association, and ran, unsuccessfully again, for a seat on the D.C. Council.

In 2007, he led a national march and rally in Charleston, West Virginia, to demand justice for Megan Williams, a young Black woman who was allegedly raped and tortured for a month by six white individuals. Shabazz promised "busloads" of supporters from across the country to protest the lack of hate crime charges in the case. The event, scheduled for November 3, was organized by BLFJ and the Support Committee for Megan Williams, with support from at least 100 Black organizations, student groups, and community leaders.

In 2023, Shabazz stood with the victims of a racist attack by law enforcement officers in Rankin County, Mississippi. With fellow attorney Trent Walker, Shabazz filed a lawsuit on behalf of Michael Corey Jenkins and Eddie Terrell Parker, two Black men who were tortured by deputies from the Rankin County Sheriff’s Department. The lawsuit is still pending, with demands for $400 million in damages for the victims.

Reportedly calling themselves the ‘Goon Squad,’ the linked police officers unlawfully entered a home where two Black men were staying with a white woman in a house in Braxton. Once inside, the officers handcuffed Jenkins and Parker and poured milk, alcohol, and chocolate syrup over them while mocking them with racial slurs. Next, they forced them to strip naked and shower together to clear the mess. Then, they mocked the victims with racial slurs and assaulted them with sex objects.

Following the report, the officers involved in the act received over 132 years of sentence, namely Brett McAlpin (32 years), Christian Dedmon (40 years), Hunter Elward (20 years), Jeffrey Middleton (17 years), Daniel Opdyke (17 years), and Joshua Hartfield (10 years). These are the longest sentences given to police officers in U.S. history and the first time in Mississippi.

After the police officers pleaded guilty, Shabazz stated: “We stand by our convictions that the Rankin County Sheriff’s Department over the last decade or more has been one of the worst-run sheriff’s departments in the country, and that’s why the Department of Justice is going forth and more revelations are forthcoming.

== Public attention ==
Shabazz first came to widespread public attention in 1994, when Unity Nation, a student group he founded at Howard University, invited Khalid Abdul Muhammad, chairman of the New Black Panther Party, to speak. Introducing the speaker, Shabazz engaged in a call and response with the audience:

Who is it that caught and killed Nat Turner? The Jews!
Who is it that controls the Federal Reserve? The Jews!
Who is it that has our entertainers ... and our athletes in a vise grip? The Jews!

A year later, Shabazz told an interviewer that everything he said was true, with the possible exception of the assertion concerning Nat Turner.

In 2002, as a spokesman for the Black Panthers, Shabazz played a crucial role in the capture of the D.C. Snipers, by encouraging people to get outside and not to live in fear.

== New Black Panther Party ==
Shabazz followed Khalid Abdul Muhammad's lead and joined the New Black Panther Party about 1997. When Muhammad, who greatly expanded the organization and rose to its chairmanship, died in early 2001, Shabazz took over as National Chairman.

The principles Shabazz purports to promote include the following:

- Black nationalism
- Black Power
- Support for reparations for slavery
- Conspiracy theories about Jewish involvement in the September 11 attacks
- The view that Jews dominated the Atlantic slave trade
- Anti-Zionism

== Prevented from entering Canada ==
In May 2007, Shabazz was invited by Black Youth Taking Action (BYTA) to speak at a rally at Queen's Park in Toronto, Ontario, Canada, and to give a lecture to students at Ryerson University. Shabazz arrived at Toronto Pearson International Airport as planned but Canada border officials prevented him from entering Canada because of past rhetoric that violated Canadian hate laws. Ontario Premier Dalton McGuinty expressed concern about Shabazz. The press reported that Shabazz was denied entry to Canada because of a minor criminal record. Shabazz flew back to Buffalo, New York, and attempted to cross the border by car, but border agents spotted him and again prevented him from entering Canada.

== 2015 demonstrations in Baltimore ==
Shabazz helped organize and promote a demonstration in Baltimore, Maryland, on April 25, 2015, following the death of Freddie Gray, a 25-year-old African-American man who died while in the custody of the Baltimore Police Department. Addressing the crowd, Shabazz called for them to "Shut it down if you want to! Shut it down!"

Shabazz planned another protest on May 2, 2015. Some in Baltimore who had been involved with the peaceful protests expressed concerns to The Baltimore Sun about his involvement. Rev. Alvin S. Gwynn Jr., who leads the Interdenominational Ministerial Alliance of Baltimore, described Shabazz as an "outside agitator" and another local pastor, Rev. Louis Wilson, said Shabazz does not speak for all African-Americans. Wilson added, "I've talked to people who wish he'd just stay away."
