= Khalid Abdul Muhammad =

American Black nationalist (1948–2001)

Khalid Muhammad
- Muhammad, c. late 1990s
- Born: Harold Moore Jr. January 12, 1948; Houston, Texas
- Died: February 17, 2001 (aged 53); Atlanta, Georgia, United States
- Resting place: Ferncliff Cemetery
- Education: Pepperdine University
- Occupations: Minister, activist
- Organization: New Black Panther Party

Khalid Abdul Muhammad (born Harold Moore Jr.; January 12, 1948 – February 17, 2001) was an American black nationalist and activist who became a prominent figure in the Nation of Islam and later the New Black Panther Party. After a racially inflammatory 1993 speech at Kean College, Muhammad was condemned and removed from his position in the Nation of Islam by Louis Farrakhan. He was also censured by both chambers of the United States Congress.

After being removed from the Nation of Islam, he served as the National Chairman of the New Black Panther Party until his death in 2001 from a brain aneurysm. He advocated Black independence and stated a personal practice of anti-miscegenation.

== Early life ==
Harold Moore Jr. was raised by his aunt, Carrie Moore Vann, in Houston, Texas, where he attended Bruce Elementary School, E.O. Smith Junior High School, and all-black Phillis Wheatley High School. After graduating high school, Moore went to Dillard University in Louisiana, where he was known as Harold Vann, to pursue a degree in theological studies, but he did not graduate. At this time, he ministered at Sloan Memorial Methodist Church. In 1967, he was initiated into Omega Psi Phi fraternity (Theta Sigma chapter). Later, Moore transferred to Pepperdine University and earned his bachelor's degree.

== Nation of Islam ==
In 1970, while attending Dillard, Moore joined the Nation of Islam, which was then under the leadership of Elijah Muhammad. He changed his name to Harold Smith or Harold 10X, then to Malik Rushaddin, became Minister Louis Farrakhan's protégé, and was active as a recruiter within the organization. In 1978, Rushaddin was appointed Western Regional Minister of the Nation of Islam and leader of Mosque #27. In 1983, Minister Farrakhan named him Khalid after the Islamic general Khalid ibn al-Walid, a follower of the Islamic prophet Muhammad, calling him the Sword of Allah.

By 1984, Muhammad had become one of Louis Farrakhan's most trusted advisors in the Nation of Islam. He traveled to Libya on a fund-raising trip, where he became well acquainted with that country's leader, Muammar al-Gaddafi. Muhammad's dedication to Farrakhan and to the message of the NOI eventually secured him the title of national spokesman and he was named one of Louis Farrakhan's friends in 1981. He served at Nation of Islam mosques in New York and Atlanta throughout the 1980s. A federal court convicted him in 1987 of mortgage fraud and sentenced him to nine months in prison. After his prison term he returned to the Nation, becoming Farrakhan's national advisor in 1991.

== 1993 speech and aftermath ==
In 1993, Muhammad gave a speech at Kean College in Union Township, New Jersey, in which Muhammad referred to Jews as "bloodsuckers" of the black community, labeled the Pope a "no-good cracker," and advocated the murder of any and all white South Africans who would not leave the nation subsequent to a warning period of 24 hours. The United States Senate and United States House of Representatives both voted overwhelmingly to support resolutions condemning the speech. Minister Louis Farrakhan responded by publicly repudiating Muhammad's speech. However, Farrakhan specified that he opposed the "tone" of Muhammad's speech, while acknowledging the "truths" in it. Despite this, Muhammad's remarks also resulted in not only Congressional Black Caucus (CBC) members distancing themselves from the Nation of Islam but also CBC chairman Kweisi Mfume ending his relationship with the Nation of Islam.

The day after Mfume's break with the NOI in February 1994, Farrakhan demoted Muhammad and also removed him as the NOI's spokesman. He was silenced as a minister and suspended from the NOI soon afterward. In 1994, Muhammad appeared on the Phil Donahue Show. When asked how he felt about being condemned by the United States House of Representatives, Muhammad said: "As a freedom fighter and a revolutionary, it is one of the greatest honors that could be paid." During the show he participated in heated arguments with white Jewish and non-Jewish audience members, amid explanations of his public statements.

On May 29, 1994, Muhammad and five of his bodyguards were shot by James Bess, a former NOI member, after he spoke at the University of California, Riverside. He survived the shooting. Muhammad himself, along with many others within the black nationalist community, believed the shooting was a part of a conspiracy. Bess was convicted of attempted murder and three counts of assault and sentenced to 18 years to life in prison.

== New Black Panther Party ==
After being stripped of his position as NOI spokesman, Muhammad became the national chairman of the New Black Panther Party. On May 21, 1997, he delivered a heated speech at San Francisco State University in which he criticized Jews, whites, Catholics and homosexuals.

In 1998, Muhammad organized the "Million Youth March" in New York City which attracted an estimated 6,000 participants. New York mayor Rudolph Giuliani denied the organizers a permit, calling it a hate march. A court ruled that the event could go on but scaled back its duration and size. At the conclusion of the rally, just as Muhammad appeared on the stage to speak, the demonstration was interrupted by a low-flying police helicopter. Muhammad alleges that was the signal for more than 3,000 police in riot gear, including some mounted on horseback, to come in and disperse the crowd. In response, Muhammad exhorted the rally participants to attack the oncoming police, to beat them with rails, and to shoot them with their own guns. Dozens were arrested, and 30 officers and five civilians were injured. Mayor Giuliani said that the march turned out to be precisely what he predicted, "filled with hatred, horrible, awful, vicious, anti-Semitic and other anti-white rhetoric, as well as exhortations to kill people, murder people ... the speeches given today should not occur [at] any place." Muhammad convened a second march in 1999.

In the year 2000, it was revealed that one of the contestants on the American version of the Dutch television show Big Brother, William Collins (Hiram Ashantee), was a follower of Muhammad.

== Musical influence ==
As a prominent Afrocentrist and speaker on African history, Muhammad attracted interest from several hip-hop artists, who sampled him in their songs. Public Enemy quoted him in the introduction of its 1988 track "Night of the Living Baseheads" from the album It Takes a Nation of Millions to Hold Us Back:

Have you forgotten that once we were brought here, we were robbed of our name, robbed of our language. We lost our religion, our culture, our god ... and many of us, by the way we act, we even lost our minds.

He also appeared on Ice Cube's albums Death Certificate (1991) and Lethal Injection (1993) as a guest rapper. On the former album, Muhammad appeared in the tracks "Death" and "The Birth". On the latter, he appeared in the song "Cave Bitch", a song ridiculing white women. On the Scarface song "Hand of the Dead Body", Ice Cube also mentioned Muhammad, saying "Down with Kahlid Abdul Muhammad / Do he got a brother? I'm it now." On MC Ren's 1996 album The Villain in Black Muhammad appeared in the track "Muhammad Speaks", where he spoke about the history of the rights of African Americans.

Musical references to Muhammad since his death include a quote of his "Kill the White Man" speech on The Used's 2009 album Artwork, a sample of his interview with Louis Theroux in the Chase & Status song "Hocus Pocus" and in the Dean Blunt song "MERLIN", and excerpts from a recording of one of his speeches concerning Jesus in the D'Angelo song "1000 Deaths" on the 2014 album Black Messiah. In 2026, rapper JPEGMAFIA referenced and compared himself to Muhammad on his song "Burning Hammer" from his project EXPERIMENTAL RAP.

== Personal life ==
Muhammad had five children, including Farrah Gray, who grew up in Chicago's South Side. Although Gray saw his father only during occasional visits, he credits Muhammad for inspiring him with confidence. Gray rose from poverty to become a successful business entrepreneur, but did not join his father's political activities.

== Death ==
In 2001, Muhammad died unexpectedly of a brain aneurysm in Atlanta, Georgia, at the age of 53. He was buried in Ferncliff Cemetery in Westchester County, New York, near the grave of Malcolm X.

== See also ==
- African American–Jewish relations
- Black separatism
- Nation of Islam and antisemitism
