= New Black Panther Party =

American Black nationalist organization

- Chairperson: Krystal Muhammad
- Founder: Aaron Michaels
- Founded: 1980s
- Headquarters: Dallas, Texas, U.S.
- Ideology: Black nationalism; Black separatism; New-Afrikanism; Anti-capitalism
- Colors: Red Black and Green
- Slogan: "Freedom or Death"

Party flag
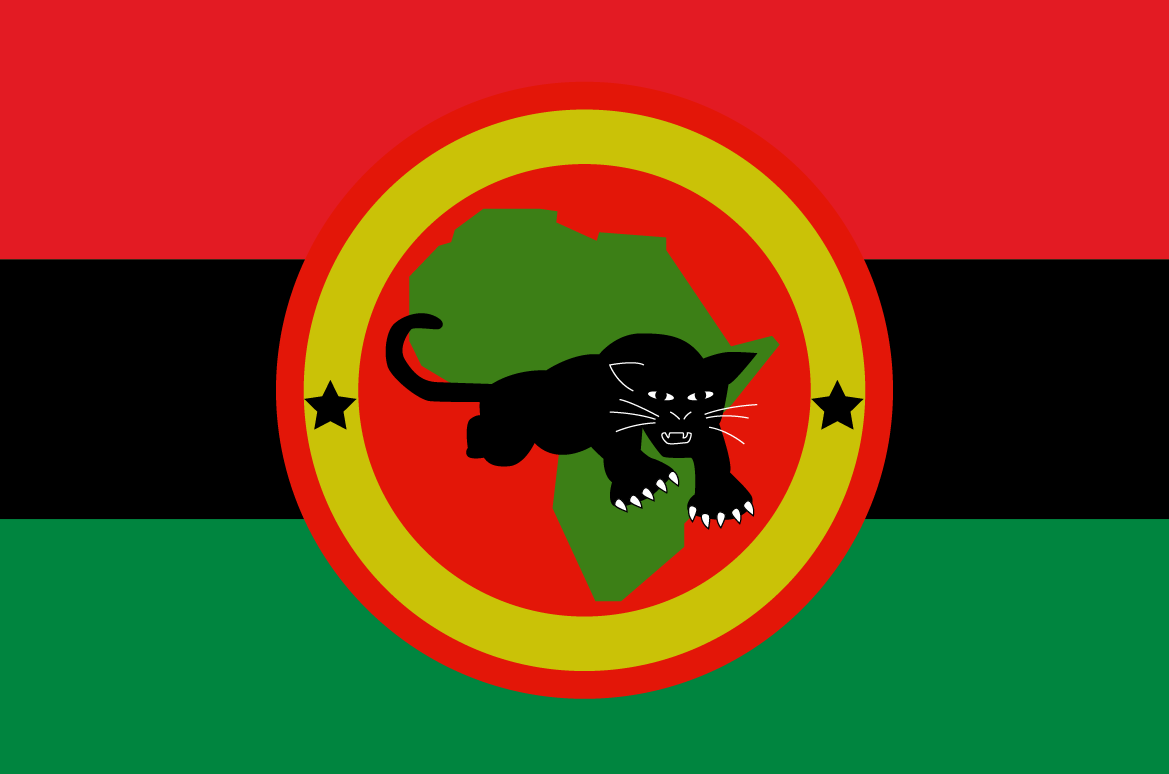

Website
- www.nbpp.org

The New Black Panther Party (NBPP) is an American black nationalist organization founded in Dallas, Texas in 1989. Despite its name, the NBPP is not an official successor to the Black Panther Party. Members of the original Black Panther Party have insisted that the new party has no legitimacy and that "there is no new Black Panther Party". The group is characterized by its departure from many of the socialist ideals of its namesake, and towards New-Afrikanism. The Anti-Defamation League, the Southern Poverty Law Center, and the U.S. Commission on Civil Rights consider the NBPP to be a hate group, accusing the organization and its leaders of racism and antisemitism.

The NBPP traces its origins to the activities of original Panther Michael McGee Sr. in Milwaukee in the late-1980s; by 1990, McGee had created the Black Panther Militia. However, as McGee expanded his organization, it later came under the control of Aaron Michaels in Dallas. In turn, Aaron Michaels lost control of the leadership of the group to Khalid Abdul Muhammad, a former leading member of the Nation of Islam, who proceeded to fill the ranks of the New Panthers with ex-Nation of Islam members and other Black Muslims. Under Muhammad and his successors' leadership, the New Panthers shifted radically from the ideology of the original Black Panther Party towards an extremist form of Black nationalism.

The NBPP is currently led by Krystal Muhammad. Malik Zulu Shabazz announced on an October 14, 2013 online radio broadcast that he was stepping down and that Hashim Nzinga, then national chief of staff, would replace him. This move created a schism within the group. A vote was held and Krystal Muhammad was elected leader of the group. However, those loyal to Nzinga left and formed a splinter group called the "New Black Panther Party for Self Defence" or "NBPP SD".

== History ==
In 1987, Michael McGee, an alderman in Milwaukee and member of the original Black Panther Party, threatened to disrupt white events throughout the city unless more jobs were created for black people. He held a "state of the inner city" press conference in 1990 at City Hall to announce the creation of the Black Panther Militia. Aaron Michaels, a community activist and radio producer in Dallas, Texas established a chapter of the Black Panther Militia in 1992, but chose to refer to his chapter as "The New Black Panther Party".

Over time, McGee lost influence over the overall groups while Michaels' grew, and eventually, it would be Aaron Michaels who took overall leadership of the Panthers groups, now using "New Black Panther Party" as their banner. Michaels became increasingly radical, and so too did the group.

In 1994, Khalid Abdul Muhammad, a prominent member of the Nation of Islam, survived an assassination attempt from a former member of that group. Following the attempt on his life, Muhammad left the Nation of Islam and went to Dallas to recover, and it was during this time that Muhammad became aligned to Aaron Michaels, and subsequently joined the NBPP. By 1998 Muhammad had seized entire control of the NBPP from Michaels by filling with former members of the Nation of Islam and other Black Muslims. In 2012, Michaels claimed it was at this point he departed from the NBPP.

In 1998, Khalid Abdul Muhammad brought the organization into the national spotlight when he led an armed group of NBPP members to provide armed protection to the family of James Byrd Jr., who had just been murdered in Jasper, Texas by three white supremacists. Events escalated into a confrontation between the NBPP and the Ku Klux Klan. Muhammad continued to seek out high profile and confrontational events, and that same year sought to organise a "Million Youth March" in Harlem, New York City. On the surface, the purpose of the march was to build solidarity amongst the black youth of America but Muhammad also sought to march into the heartland of Nation of Islam support and demonstrate he had a group to compete for their support. Mayor Rudolph Giuliani sought to block the march but was overruled by a federal judge. The March went ahead on 5 September 1998 and Muhammad gave a speech to an audience of 6,000. When the police attempted to end the march at the designated end time, Muhammad encouraged those in attendance to physically resist them. It was in this same time period that Muhammad and the NBPP featured in an episode of Louis Theroux's Weird Weekends entitled "Black Nationalism".

Khalid Muhammad died of a brain aneurysm on February 17, 2001, and was succeeded by Malik Zulu Shabazz, a protege of Muhammad's as well as his personal attorney. Like Muhammad, Shabazz continued to push the NBPP in an increasingly anti-Semitic and racial segregationist direction. Under Shabazz's leadership, the group would continue to appear across America during instances of racial tension and conflict, however, Shabazz was never able to return the group to the high-profile it had in the media and public's mind during Muhammad's time.

== Ideology ==
The New Black Panther Party identifies with the original Black Panther Party and it claims to uphold its legacy. While the party says that many others see the organization similarly, the NBPP is largely seen by both the general public and prominent members of the original party as illegitimate. Foundation members, containing a significant number of the original party's leaders, once successfully sued the group; their ultimate objective in doing so—to prevent the NBPP from using the Panther name—appears to have been unsuccessful. In response to the suit, Aaron Michaels branded the opposing original Panthers "has-been wannabe Panthers", adding: "Nobody can tell us who we can call ourselves." The NBPP rewrote the original Black Panther Platform to address issues such as "black-on-black violence", the military justice system, and political prisoners.

Although the NBPP says it sees capitalism as the fundamental problem with the world and revolution as the solution, the new party does not draw its influences from Marxism or Maoism as the original party did. Instead, it promotes the Kawaida theory of Maulana Karenga, which includes black unity, collective action, and cooperative economics. The NBPP says it fights the oppression of black and brown people and that its members are on top of current issues facing black communities across the world. Also, it notes that not all of its members are members of the Nation of Islam, although the group acknowledges universal spirituality practices within the organization. The NBPP is strongly anti-Zionist.

Over time, many groups subscribing to varying degrees of radicalism have called for the "right to self-determination" for black people, particularly African-Americans. Critics of the NBPP say that the group's politics represent a dangerous departure from the original intent of black nationalism; specifically, that they are starkly anti-white, and also antisemitic. The group blames the September 11 attacks on Jews. The Southern Poverty Law Center classifies the NBPP as a black separatist hate group and says that its leaders "have advocated the killing of Jews and white people". Some Black Panthers sued the NBPP and tried to get it to stop using the Black Panther name, as they considered the group racist.

== Organization ==
=== Membership size ===
As of 2009, the NBPP claimed a few thousand members organized in 45 chapters, while independent estimates by the Anti-Defamation League suggest that the group is much smaller but is nevertheless able to attract a large turnout of non-members to its events by focusing on specific issues of local interest.

=== French Wing ===
In April 2010, Malik Zulu Shabazz appointed French Black leader Kémi Séba as the representative of the movement in France. However, Séba left the position in 2011.

=== 2013 schism ===
In October 2013, Malik Zulu Shabazz announced he was stepping down as leader of the organization. He attempted to place Hashim Nzinga as his main successor. However, this move prompted a body of the group to gather for a meeting, where they elected Krystal Muhammad as their new chairperson. These events prompted a split of the organization into two competing factions. Muhammad's faction retained the name "New Black Panther Party", while the Nzinga faction dubbed themselves "The New Black Panther Party for Self Defence" or "NBPP SD". The two groups remain at odds, each attempting to control the name recognition of "The New Panthers".

== Controversies ==
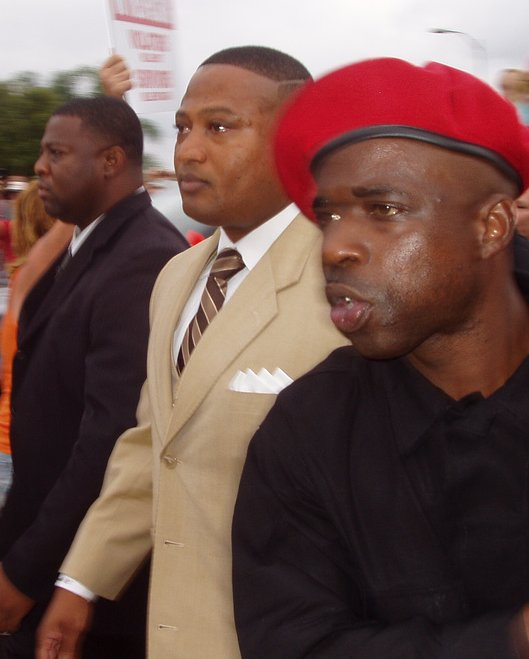
Quanell X (center), the party leader in Houston, at Joe Horn protest, 2007

The New Black Panther Party became involved in a melee outside Congresswoman Cynthia McKinney's campaign headquarters after she lost a Democratic primary election to her opponent, Hank Johnson. The NBPP's Chief of Staff, Hashim Nzinga, had been acting as security detail for McKinney when he physically attacked reporters, calling them Jews and insisting that they must focus on Hank Johnson rather than on McKinney, since Johnson, he alleged, was a "Tom." In a subsequent appearance on the Fox News Channel program Hannity & Colmes, Nzinga defended these actions. He accused his interviewers of being part of a "Zionist" media complex bent on defaming African Americans and, by extension, the New Black Panthers.

In 2006, the New Black Panther Party regained the media spotlight by intervening in the 2006 Duke University lacrosse team scandal, organizing marches outside Duke University and making numerous media appearances to demand that the jury organized by then-District Attorney Mike Nifong convict the accused lacrosse players.

On April 12, 2007, after the case brought by Nifong collapsed and the Duke Lacrosse players were exonerated, Malik Zulu Shabazz appeared on The O'Reilly Factor. He refused to apologize for his actions in the lead-up to the Duke University lacrosse rape scandal, stating that he did not know whether or not anything happened to the young accuser. He stated his beliefs that the rich white families of Duke had placed political pressure on the investigation and forced the charges to be dropped. When questioned by guest host Michelle Malkin, he labeled her a political prostitute and mouthpiece for a male, chauvinist, racist Bill O'Reilly. Malkin said, "There's only one whore on this split screen and it's you, Mr. Shabazz." Shabazz replied, "You should be ashamed of yourself for defending and being a spokesman for Bill O'Reilly, who has no respect for women."

Calling the NBPP extremist, critics have cited Muhammad's Million Youth March in Harlem, a youth equivalent of the Million Man March, in which the protest against police brutality included speakers calling for the extermination of white South Africans. The rally ended in scuffles with the New York Police Department as Muhammad urged the crowd to attack officers who had attempted to confiscate firearms. Chairs and bottles were thrown at the police, but only a few in the clash suffered injuries. The Million Youth March was subsequently named an annual event.

King Samir Shabazz, a former Nation of Islam member and head of the New Black Panther Party's Philadelphia chapter, has a long history of confrontational racist behavior. He advocated racial separation and made incendiary racial statements while promoting anti-police messages in the media and on the streets of Philadelphia. He publicly announced, "I hate white people. All of them." He also suggested the killing of white babies. Shabazz was arrested in June 2013 for carrying a loaded, unlicensed weapon. The party has claimed his arrest is part of an "onslaught of attacks against the New Black Panther Party."

=== Alleged voter intimidation in Philadelphia ===
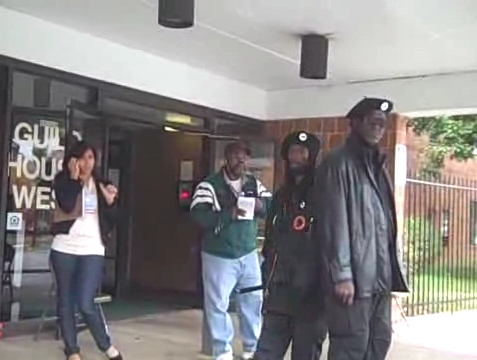
Alleged instance of voter intimidation in Philadelphia during the 2008 US presidential election

During the 2008 presidential election, poll watchers found two New Black Panther militia members shouting racial slurs outside a polling place in Philadelphia. One of the two was a credentialed poll watcher, while the other was a New Black Panther member who had brought a police-style nightstick baton. A University of Pennsylvania student, Stephen Robert Morse, was hired by the local Republican Party on behalf of the John McCain presidential campaign to tape the incident. His video aired on several news outlets throughout the country. Republican poll watcher Chris Hill stated that voters were complaining about intimidation, while the District Attorney's office stated that they had not been contacted by any voters. The New Black Panther with the nightstick was escorted away by the police.

On January 7, 2009, the United States Department of Justice (DOJ) filed a civil suit against the New Black Panther Party and three of its members alleging violations of the Voting Rights Act of 1965 over the incident at the Philadelphia polling place. The suit accused members King Samir Shabazz and Jerry Jackson of being outside a polling location wearing the uniform of the New Black Panther Party for Self-Defense, and said that Shabazz repeatedly brandished a police-style baton weapon. The suit sought an injunction preventing further violations of the Voting Rights Act. After the defendants did not appear for court, a default judgment was entered. On May 29, 2009, the Department of Justice requested and received an injunction against the member who had carried the nightstick, but against the advice of prosecutors who had worked on the case, department superiors ordered the suit dropped against the remaining members. On July 6, 2010, J. Christian Adams, a former lawyer for the Justice Department, testified before the Commission on Civil Rights and alleged that the case was dropped because "[w]e abetted wrongdoing and abandoned law-abiding citizens". Former Civil Rights Division Voting Section Chief Christopher Coates testified on September 24, 2010, "I am here today to testify about the Department of Justice's final disposition of the New Black Panther Party case and the hostility in the Civil Rights Division and the Voting Section toward the equal enforcement of some of the federal voting laws." (pp. 7, 22–25; pp. 8, 1–2) Abigail Thernstrom, the Republican-appointed vice chairwoman of the Commission, wrote that the Panthers should perhaps have been prosecuted under section 11 (b) of the Voting Rights Act for [its] actions of November 2008, but the legal standards that must be met to prove voter intimidation—the charge—are very high. And "The incident involved only two Panthers at a single majority-black precinct in Philadelphia. So far—after months of hearings, testimony and investigation no one has produced actual evidence that any voters were too scared to cast their ballots."

According to an April 23, 2010 press release from the New Black Panther Party, the Philadelphia member involved in the nightstick incident was suspended until January 2010. "The New Black Panther Party made it clear then and now we don't support voter intimidation ... The charges against the entire organization and the chairman were dropped. The actions of one individual cannot be attributed to an entire organization any more than every act of any member of the Catholic Church be charged to the Vatican."

=== Bounty for George Zimmerman's capture ===
Another controversy occurred in 2012 after the NBPP offered a $10,000 bounty for the citizen's arrest of George Zimmerman, the man who killed Trayvon Martin. The group also stated that it believed in "a life for a life". The bounty offer was condemned and repudiated by Martin's family and others, including the Rev. Jesse Jackson. The NBPP's organizer, Mikhail Mohammed, said that the United States Constitution granted the right to a citizen's arrest.

=== Prevented from entering Canada ===
In May 2007, Chairman Shabazz was invited by Black Youth Taking Action (BYTA) to speak at a rally at Queen's Park in Toronto, Ontario, Canada, and to give a lecture to students at Ryerson University. The Ryerson Students' Union (RSU) had endorsed the event as it called for grade-school curricula to acknowledge the historical contribution of African-Canadians and African-Americans, and for the Brampton, Ontario, super jail project to be dismantled. A spokesperson for the RSU later stated that support for the event was given "before they knew that Shabazz was the speaker."

Shabazz arrived at Toronto Pearson International Airport as planned but Canada border officials prevented him from entering Canada because of past rhetoric that violated Canadian hate laws. Although Canada's airports and borders are within the federal jurisdiction, the Ontario Community Safety and Correctional Services Minister, Monte Kwinter, justified the barring of Shabazz. Ontario Premier Dalton McGuinty expressed concern about Shabazz. The press reported that Shabazz was denied entry to Canada because of a minor criminal record. Shabazz flew back to Buffalo, New York and attempted to cross the border by car, but border agents spotted him and again prevented him from entering Canada.

The rally at Queen's Park went ahead without Shabazz, with approximately 100 people, plus at least two dozen journalists. Ryerson University canceled the planned lecture. The university administration alerted the RSU that it had received e-mails of threats of violent disruption of the event. The RSU canceled Shabazz's lecture because of safety concerns. Heather Kere, RSU's Vice-President of Education, said, "We definitely recognize there was some criticism of his views" and "we were endorsing the campaign's goals and not the individual speaker." Kere added, "He deflected attention away from the main point of the campaign. We still strongly believe in the campaign."

Hashim Nzinga, Shabazz's chief of staff, blamed Jewish groups for the incident, stating in a telephone interview, "They let these groups like the ADL (Anti-Defamation League) and the JDL (Jewish Defense League), which is nothing but a bunch of gangsters, dictate what happens in the world today," and "They told Canada not to let us in and Canada followed [its] rules, because this country is run from Israel." Nkem Anizor, president of the BYTA, also blamed the "Jewish lobby" for the government's decision to deny Shabazz entry to Canada, Shabazz later said, "Canada is on Malik alert," and "B'nai Brith has won this one, and I'm starting to see the power of the Jewish lobby in Canada, full force. I thought Canada was free. I think this is evidence that black people are being oppressed in Canada."

=== Involvement of Micah Xavier Johnson ===
Micah Xavier Johnson, who ambushed and shot at police officers in Dallas, Texas, in July 2016 after a peaceful protest against police killings of African-American men elsewhere in the United States, had "liked" the Facebook pages of several black nationalist organizations, including the NBPP, Mauricelm-Lei Millere and African American Defense League, who according to the Southern Poverty Law Center may have radicalized Johnson. Quanell X, the leader of the NBPP in Houston, Texas, said Johnson had been a member of that city's chapter several years earlier, for about six months. He also said Johnson had been asked to leave the group for espousing dangerous rhetoric and violating the organization's "chain of command", and that Johnson questioned NBPP's tactics, asking why they had not purchased more weapons and ammunition. In a written statement, the NBPP said Johnson was not a member of the organization and that "a simple like ... via a social media website does not represent membership, affiliation, or endorsement. It simply is what it is ... a like on the page."

== Criticism ==
=== Criticism by former members of the original Black Panther Party ===
The Huey P. Newton Foundation issued a news release denouncing the New Black Panther Party. Its release read in part:

As guardian of the true history of the Black Panther Party, the Foundation, which includes former leading members of the Party, denounces this group's exploitation of the Party's name and history. Failing to find its own legitimacy in the black community, this band would graft the Party's name upon itself, which we condemn. ... [T]hey denigrate the Party's name by promoting concepts absolutely counter to the revolutionary principles on which the Party was founded. ... The Black Panthers were never a group of angry young militants full of fury toward the "white establishment." The Party operated on love for black people, not hatred of white people.

Bobby Seale, one of the co-founding members of the Black Panther Party, also spoke out against the New Black Panther Party. In a 2010 interview, he called the group's rhetoric xenophobic and described its leaders' remarks as "absurd, racial, [and] categorical".

[W]e will never, ever stoop to the low level of the mentality of a racist to just hate another person because of the color of their skin or ethnicity. We don't do that. That's not the goal objective. The goal objective is human liberation. The goal objective is the greater community cooperation of humanism. The goal objective is to get rid of institutionalized racism.

Reacting to a video of two NBPP members positioned outside of a polling place on Election Day in 2008 in Philadelphia, Seale agreed with CNN Newsroom anchor Kyra Phillips "to some degree" that the incident was voter intimidation. He also described what he saw as significant differences between the original Black Panthers and the New Black Panthers, particularly between their respective Ten-Point Programs.

=== 2002 intimidation of original Panthers ===
In April 2002, an event was held in Washington, D.C. to celebrate the 35th anniversary of the creation of the Black Panther Party. Ron Scott, a co-founder of the Detroit chapter of the Panthers, was a guest speaker, and many in attendance were also original members of the Black Panther Party. During the course of the night, the event was interrupted by 30 members of the New Black Panther Party dressed in motorcycle helmets and steel-capped boots, led by Malik Zulu Shabazz. Shabazz and his NBPP member seized control of the event and ordered under threat of violence that the original Panthers cease criticism of the New Panthers.

=== 2015 assault of Dhoruba bin Wahad ===
On August 19, 2015, Dhoruba bin Wahad (a member of the original Black Panther Party) and an associate were assaulted by a faction of the New Black Panther Party. Wahad had been attending a conference in Atlanta, Georgia held by the Nzinga faction of the "New" Panthers. Wahad confronted the group about their adoption of the Black Panther name and their rhetoric. The two were ordered to leave but when they refused, Wahad was assaulted. Wahad was left with a concussion, a broken jaw and lacerations from the attack. The event led founding member of the original Black Panthers, Elbert "Big Man" Howard, to denounce the group as "reactionaries" and "thugs".

== See also ==
- Black nationalism
- Black power
- Black separatism
- Ethnic nationalism
- Not Fucking Around Coalition
