= Bolton (surname) =

Bolton is an English surname. Notable people with the surname include:

== Academics ==
- Andrew Bolton (curator) (born 1966), British museum curator
- Geoffrey Bolton (1931–2015), Australian academic historian
- Herbert Eugene Bolton (1870–1953), American historian and professor
- Jim Bolton (historian), English medieval economic historian
- Patrick Bolton (born 1957), American economist and professor
- Robert Bolton (clergyman, born 1572) (1572–1631), English clergyman and academic
- Samuel Bolton (1606–1654), English clergyman and scholar

== Art ==
- Clarence Bolton (1893–1962), American painter and lithographer
- Constance Bolton (née Beard, 1884–1949), New Zealand painter
- Nancy Bolton (1913 – 2008), Australian artist and teacher

== Banking and finance ==
- Anthony Bolton (born 1950), British investment fund manager and investor
- Frederic Bolton (1851–1920), English shipowner and underwriter
- James C. Bolton (1899–1974), American banker in Louisiana; son of James W. Bolton

== Entertainment ==
- Betty Bolton (1906–2005), British actress
- Emily Bolton (born 1951), Dutch actress
- Joe Bolton (television personality) (1910–1986), American radio and television personality
- John Bolton (actor) (born 1965), American actor
- Marc Bolton (born 1968), English actor
- Mary Catherine Bolton (1790/91–1830), English actress, later known as Lady Thurlow
- Michael Bolton (born 1953), American singer
- Roger Bolton (producer) (born 1945), British television producer and radio presenter
- Zach Bolton (born 1981), American director, producer, and voice actor

== Military ==
- Cecil H. Bolton (1908–1965), United States Army colonel and Medal of Honor recipient
- Claude M. Bolton Jr. (1945–2015), American Air Force Major General
- Daniel Bolton (1793–1860), English military engineer
- Edward L. Bolton, United States Air Force major general
- Francis Bolton (1831–1887), British Army officer and engineer
- William Bolton (Royal Navy officer, died 1817), captain in the Royal Navy
- William Bolton (Royal Navy officer, died 1830) (1777–1830), post-captain in the Royal Navy
- William Compton Bolton (died 1849), English-born officer in the United States Navy
- William Kinsey Bolton (1861–1941), Australian soldier and politician

== Music ==
- Dupree Bolton (1929–1993), American jazz trumpeter
- Ivor Bolton (born 1958), English conductor and harpsichordist
- Steve Bolton (born 1949), English rock musician, also known as Boltz
- Tangelene Bolton (born 1991), American composer and music producer

== Politics and law ==
=== Australia ===
- Alexander Bolton (1847–1918), Australian politician
- Elizabeth Bolton (born 1950), Australian lawyer, judge and magistrate
- Harry Bolton (1870–1956), Australian politician in the Western Australian Legislative Assembly
- Henry Bolton (Australian politician) (1842–1900), Australian politician and brewer
- Sandy Bolton (born 1964), Australian politician

=== United Kingdom ===
- Edward Bolton (1592–1659), English-born judge in Ireland
- Henry Bolton (British politician) (born 1963), former leader of the UK Independence Party
- Hugh Bolton (trade unionist) (died 1947), British trade union official
- John Bolton (Haverfordwest MP) (fl. 1555), English politician
- John Bolton (Manx politician) (died 1980), Manx politician and accountant
- Joseph Cheney Bolton (1819–1901), Scottish politician and merchant
- Molly Bolton (1897–1991), British politician
- Norman Bolton (1875–1965), British civil servant in British India
- Robert Bolton (politician) (fl. 1990s), Northern Ireland politician
- Roger Bolton (1947–2006), British trade unionist
- Thomas Bolton (politician) (1841–1906), British politician
- Thomas Henry Bolton (1841–1916), English solicitor and politician
- William Bolton (Lord Mayor), English merchant and Lord Mayor of London in 1866

=== United States ===
- Chester C. Bolton (1882–1939), American politician in Ohio; father of Oliver P. Bolton
- Frances P. Bolton (1885–1977), American politician in Ohio; mother of Oliver P. Bolton
- George Washington Bolton (1841–1931), American politician in Louisiana; father of James W. Bolton
- John Bolton (born 1948), 25th United States ambassador to the United Nations, 27th United States national security advisor
- John M. Bolton (1901–1936), American businessman and politician in Illinois
- Oliver P. Bolton (1917–1972), American politician in Ohio; son of Frances P. Bolton and Chester C. Bolton
- Richard J. Bolton (1875–1954), American politician in New York and hotel owner
- Ron Bolton (politician) (fl. 2022, American politician
- Susan R. Bolton (born 1951), American judge in Arizona
- William P. Bolton (1885–1964), American politician in Maryland

=== Other ===
- Cornelius Bolton (died 1829) (1751–1829), Irish landowner and politician
- Ferris Bolton (1853–1937), Canadian politician and farmer in Manitoba
- John Bolton (Canadian politician) (1824–1872), Canadian businessman and political figure in New Brunswick
- Kenneth Bolton (1906–1996), Canadian politician in Ontario

== Religion ==
- Charles Anselm Bolton (c. 1905–c.1970), English priest and professor of history and languages
- Frederick Bolton (1908–1987), Dean of Leighlin from 1963 to 1983
- George Bolton (priest) (1905–1968), Dean of Elphin and Ardagh from 1963 to 1967
- Hugh Bolton (priest) (died 1758), Dean of Waterford from 1723 until his death
- John Bolton (priest) (1665–1724), Dean of Derry from 1700 until his death
- William Bolton (priest), Dean of Ross, Ireland, from 1630 to 1637

== Science ==
- Barry Bolton, English myrmecologist
- Charles Bolton (pathologist) (1870–1947), British physician and pathologist
- Charles Francis Bolton (born 1932), Canadian professor of neurology
- Elmer Keiser Bolton (1886–1968), American chemist
- Henry Carrington Bolton (1843–1903), American chemist and bibliographer of science
- Herbert Bolton (palaeontologist) (1863–1936), British palaeontologist
- James Bolton (1735–1799), English naturalist, mycologist, and illustrator
- John Gatenby Bolton (1922–1993), British-Australian astronomer
- Joseph Shaw Bolton (1867–1946), British physician, pathologist, alienist, neurologist, and professor of medicine
- Lissant Bolton (born 1954), Australian anthropologist
- Malcolm Bolton (born 1946), British soil mechanics engineer and professor
- Reginald Pelham Bolton (1856–1942), Anglo-American engineer, archaeologist and historian
- Sarah Bolton (physicist), American physicist and university administrator
- Scott J. Bolton, American theoretical and experimental space physicist
- Thaddeus L. Bolton (1865–1948), American psychologist
- Tom Bolton (astronomer) (1943–2021), American-Canadian astronomer
- Werner von Bolton (1868–1912), German chemist and materials scientist

== Sports ==
=== American football (gridiron) ===
- Andy Bolton (American football) (born 1954), American gridiron football running back
- Curtis Bolton (born 1995), American gridiron football linebacker
- Harry Bolton (American football) (1919–1986), American gridiron football tackle
- Nathaniel Bolton (born 1968), American gridiron football wide receiver and running back
- Nick Bolton (born 2000), American gridiron football linebacker
- Ron Bolton (American football) (born 1950), American gridiron football defensive back and coach
- Scott Bolton (American football) (born 1965), American gridiron football wide receiver

=== Association football (soccer) ===
- Arthur Bolton (1912–2001), English footballer
- Clint Bolton (born 1975), Australian football goalkeeper
- Hugh Bolton (footballer) (1879–unknown), Scottish footballer
- Ian Bolton (born 1953), English footballer
- Jack Bolton (1941–2021), Scottish footballer
- James Bolton (footballer) (born 1994), English footballer
- Joe Bolton (footballer) (born 1955), English footballer
- Josh Bolton (born 1984), American soccer player
- Laurie Bolton (1932–2018), English footballer
- Leslie Bolton (1909–1986), Danish footballer
- Luke Bolton (born 1999), English footballer
- Nigel Bolton (born 1975), English footballer
- William Bolton (footballer) (fl. 1915), English footballer

=== Australian rules football ===
- Brendon Bolton (born 1979), Tasmanian coach of Australian rules football
- Charles Bolton (footballer) (1876–1954), Australian rules footballer
- Craig Bolton (born 1980), Australian rules footballer
- Darren Bolton (born 1976), Australian rules footballer
- David Bolton (Australian footballer) (born 1960), Australian rules footballer
- Jude Bolton (born 1980), Australian rules footballer
- Jye Bolton (born 1992), Australian rules footballer
- Mark Bolton (born 1979), Australian rules footballer
- Shai Bolton (born 1998), Australian rules footballer

=== Baseball ===
- Cecil Bolton (1904–1993), American baseball first baseman
- Cliff Bolton (1907–1979), American baseball catcher
- Rodney Bolton (born 1968), American baseball pitcher
- Tom Bolton (baseball) (born 1962), American baseball pitcher

=== Basketball ===
- Rasir Bolton (born 1999), American basketball player
- Ruthie Bolton (born 1967), American basketball player

=== Cricket ===
- Alan Bolton (cricketer) (1939–2003), English cricketer
- Benjamin Bolton (1862–1910), English cricketer
- Bertie Bolton (1893–1964), British cricketer and army officer
- Bruce Bolton (born 1935), New Zealand cricketer
- John Bolton (cricketer) (1881–1935), Australian cricketer
- Nicole Bolton (born 1989), Australian cricketer

=== Ice hockey ===
- Hugh Bolton (ice hockey) (1929–1999), Canadian ice hockey player
- Jenny Bolton (born 1992), English ice hockey player

=== Rugby ===
- Dave Bolton (1937–2021), British rugby league footballer who also played in Australia
- Phil Bolton (born 1983), American rugby union player
- Reg Bolton (rugby union) (1909–2006), English rugby union player and physician
- Richard Bolton (rugby league) (1943–2024), New Zealand former rugby league footballer, manager, and coach
- Scott Bolton (rugby league) (born 1987), Australian rugby league footballer
- Shayne Bolton (born 2000), South African rugby union player
- Wilfred Bolton (1862–1930), English rugby union player
- William Bolton (rugby union) (1851–1896), Scottish rugby union player

=== Other ===
- Alan Bolton (darts player), New Zealand darts player
- Andrew Bolton (rower) (born 1980), American lightweight rower
- Andy Bolton (born 1970), English powerlifter and strongman
- Bay Bolton (1705–1736), British Thoroughbred racehorse, also known as Brown Lusty
- Bonner Bolton (born 1987), American rodeo cowboy and fashion model
- Brett Bolton (born 2006), American sledge hockey player
- Cameron Bolton (born 1990), Australian snowboarder
- Charlotte Bolton (born 2003), Canadian para-athlete
- Colleen Bolton (born 1957), Australian cross-country skier
- Emmet Bolton (born 1985), Irish player of Gaelic football
- John Bolton (weightlifter) (born 1945), New Zealand light-heavyweight weightlifter
- Lyndon Bolton (1899–1995), British horseman
- Matthew Bolton (born 1979), Australian billiards and snooker player
- Nancye Wynne Bolton (1916–2001), Australian tennis player
- Ryan Bolton (born 1973), American triathlete
- Sam Bolton (born 2002), British ski jumper
- Shae Bolton (born 1989), Australian netball player, later known as Shae Brown
- Toy Bolton (1926–2001), American motorsports driver and team owner in NASCAR

== Writing ==
- Deric Bolton (1908–1993), Scottish poet and research chemist
- Edmund Bolton (c.1575–c.1633), English historian and poet
- Gambier Bolton (1854–1928), English author and photographer
- Guy Bolton (1884–1979), Anglo-American playwright and writer of musical comedies
- Isabel Bolton (born Mary Britton Miller; 1883–1975), American poet and novelist
- Ivy May Bolton (1879–1961), English-American nun and writer
- Joe Bolton (poet) (1961–1990), American poet
- John Bolton (illustrator) (born 1951), British comic and graphic artist
- Ken Bolton (born 1949), Australian poet
- Muriel Roy Bolton (1908–1983), American film and television writer
- Sarah Knowles Bolton (1841–1916), American writer
- Sarah T. Bolton (1814–1893), American poet and women's rights activist
- Sharon Bolton, British author of mystery fiction, published as S. J. Bolton

== Other ==
- Charles B. Bolton (1909–1976), American dentist
- Deirdre Bolton, American journalist and news anchor
- Kerry Bolton (born 1956), New Zealand occultist and far-right activist
- Linda Burnes Bolton, American nurse and healthcare administrator
- Mary Bolton (addiction counsellor) (1920–1996), Irish counsellor and (non-clinical) psychotherapist
- Reg Bolton (clown) (1945–2006), English-born clown in the United Kingdom and Australia
- Roxcy Bolton (1926–2017), American feminist and civil rights activist
- Steve Bolton (entrepreneur) (born 1967), British entrepreneur
- Walter James Bolton (1888–1957), New Zealand criminal
- William Robert Fossey Bolton (1905–1973), Australian businessman and philanthropist

== Fictional characters ==
- Jack Bolton (High School Musical), a character in the 2006 American television film High School Musical
- Jambo Bolton, a character in the British Channel 4 soap opera Hollyoaks
- Kevin Bolton, a character in British soap opera EastEnders
- Ramsay Bolton, a character in the A Song of Ice and Fire series of fantasy novels
- Roose Bolton, a character in the A Song of Ice and Fire series of fantasy novels
- Troy Bolton, a character in the 2006 American television film High School Musical

== See also ==
- Bolten
- Bolton (disambiguation)
- Boulton (surname)
- Colton (surname)
- Holton (surname)
