= William Bolton =

William Bolton may refer to:

- William Bolton (priest), Dean of Ross, Ireland, 1630–1637
- Sir William Bolton (died 1680), English merchant and Lord Mayor
- William Bolton (Royal Navy officer, died 1817), Royal Navy Captain (served 1789–1809)
- William Bolton (Royal Navy officer, died 1830), Royal Navy Captain (served 1793–1815)
- William Compton Bolton, United States Navy officer (served 1806–d.1849)
- William Kinsey Bolton (1861–1941), commanding officer of the Australian 8th Battalion AIF during World War I for the landings at Gallipoli
- William P. Bolton (1885–1964), U.S. Congressman from Maryland
- William Bolton (footballer), English football winger (active 1915)
- William Robert Fossey Bolton (1905–1973), businessman and philanthropist from Toowoomba, Australia
- William Bolton (rugby union) (1815–1896), Scottish rugby union player
