= Colton (surname) =

Colton is a surname of Irish and English origin. In Ireland, it is an anglicized form of Ó Cómhaltáin, meaning 'descendant of Cómhaltán', a branch of the Ó Cléirigh. In England, it is a habitational name from several eponymous places, meaning 'charcoal town' or 'Cola's town'.

== People with the surname ==
- Anita O'Day, née Anita Belle Colton (1919–2006), jazz singer
- Ann Ree Colton (1898–1984), founder of "Niscience"
- Bertha Colton (died 1959), American politician
- Charles Colton (disambiguation)
- David Douty Colton (1831–1878), California pioneer, entrepreneur, politician
- Dean Colton, Scottish rugby player
- Don B. Colton (1876–1952), American politician
- Eben Pomeroy Colton (1829–1895), Lieutenant Governor of Vermont
- Frank B. Colton (1923–2003), American chemist
- Gardner Quincy Colton (1814–1898), American anesthesiologist
- George Colton (disambiguation)

- George Colton (Maryland politician) (1817–1898), American politician, printer and newspaperman
- George Radcliffe Colton (1886–1916), Governor of Puerto Rico

- Ginger Colton (1875–1946), Australian rugby player
- Graham Colton (born 1981), American singer-songwriter
- Joel Colton (1918–2011), American historian and author
- John Colton (disambiguation)

- John Colton (bishop) (c. 1320–1404), statesman and cleric in Ireland
- John Colton (politician) (1823–1902), South Australian politician
- John Colton (screenwriter) (1887–1946), American playwright and screenwriter

- J. H. Colton (1800–1893), American cartographer
- Larry Colton, baseball player
- Lillian Colton (1911–2007), American crop artist
- Marie Colton (1922–2018), American politician
- Mark Colton (1961–1995), British racing driver
- Mary-Russell Ferrell Colton (1889–1971), American artist, author, educator, ethnographer, and curator, cofounder Museum of Northern Arizona
- Michael Colton, American writer and comedian
- Micky Colton, Canadian military pilot
- Milo Colton, American politician
- Paul Colton (born 1960), Irish Anglican bishop
- Puddin Colton (1874–1958), Australian rugby player
- Roger B. Colton (1887–1978), American Army General during World War II
- Ross Colton (born 1996), American ice hockey player
- Sabin W. Colton (1847–1925), American investor
- Sandra Colton, American dancer and actress
- Scott Colton (born 1980), American wrestler
- Simon Colton, English computer scientist
- Trax Colton (1929–2025), American film actor
- Walter Colton (1797–1851), American chaplain, newspaperman, and author
- William Colton (disambiguation)
- David Colton (1951-2021), Australian Jazz Guitarist

== Fictional characters ==
- General Joseph Colton, a fictional character in the G.I. Joe universe
- Rosie Colton, a fictional character from the British soap opera Doctors

== See also ==
- Kolton, given name and surname
- Coulton, surname
- Bolton, surname
- Holton, surname
