= John Bolton (disambiguation) =

John Bolton (born 1948) is a former U.S. National Security Advisor and United States Ambassador to the United Nations.

John Bolton may also refer to:

== Politicians ==
- John Bolton (York MP), English Member of Parliament for the City of York in 1399 and 1407
- John Bolton (Haverfordwest MP) (fl. 1524–1556), MP for Haverfordwest
- John Bolton (Canadian politician) (1824–1872), member of the Canadian House of Commons
- Sir John Bolton (Manx politician) (c. 1901–1980), Chairman of the Isle of Man Finance Board
- John M. Bolton (1901–1936), Member of the Illinois House of Representatives and businessman

== Others ==
- John Bolton of Reading, imprisoned 1554 in Foxes Book of Martyrs
- John Bolton (priest) (1665–1724), Dean of Derry
- John Bolton, code name of Benjamin Tallmadge (1754–1835), George Washington's spymaster
- John Bolton (merchant) (1756–1837), Liverpool merchant, slaver, landowner, and lieutenant-colonel
- John Bolton (cricketer) (1881–1935), Australian cricketer
- John Gatenby Bolton (1922–1993), British-Australian astronomer
- John Bolton (weightlifter) (born 1945), New Zealand weightlifter
- John Bolton (illustrator) (born 1951), British comic and graphic artist
- John Bolton (actor) (born 1965), American actor

== See also ==
- John Bolton Rogerson (1809–1859), English poet
- John Boulton, fictional character in British drama The Bill; played by Russell Boulter
