= Charles Bolton =

Charles Bolton may refer to:

- Charles Bolton (pathologist) (1870–1947), British physician and pathologist
- Charles Bolton (footballer) (1876–1954), Australian rules footballer
- Charles Bolton (British Army officer) (1882–1963), British Army officer and English rugby union player
- Charles Anselm Bolton (1905–1970), British Roman Catholic priest and writer
- Charles B. Bolton (1909–1976), American dentist
- Charles Francis Bolton (born 1932), Canadian physician and neurologist
- Tom Bolton (astronomer) (Charles Thomas Bolton, 1943–2021), American-Canadian astronomer
- A pseudonym of Black Bart (outlaw)
