= Joseph Bolton =

Joe or Joseph Bolton may refer to:

- Joseph Cheney Bolton (1819–1901), Scottish Member of Parliament for Stirlingshire, 1880–1892
- Joseph Shaw Bolton (1867–1946), English physician, pathologist, neurologist and professor of mental diseases
- Joe Bolton (television personality) (1910–1986), American children's host ("Officer Joe") in New York City from 1948 to 1975
- Joe Bolton (footballer) (born 1955), English left full-back
- Joe Bolton (poet) (1961–1990), American author of three books

== See also ==
- Bolton (disambiguation)
