= John Belton =

John Belton may refer to:

- John Belton (academic), Professor Emeritus of English and Film at Rutgers University
- Jack Belton (died 1963), Irish politician
- Jackie Belton (1895–1952), English footballer with Nottingham Forest

== See also ==
- John Belton O'Neall (1793–1863), judge in colonial South Carolina
- John Bolton (disambiguation)
