= James Bolton (disambiguation) =

James Bolton (1735–1799) was an English naturalist and illustrator.

James Bolton may also refer to:

- James W. Bolton (1869–1936), American banker, civic leader, and school board president
- James C. Bolton (1899–1974), American banker, civic leader, and Baptist layman, son of James W. Bolton
- James Bolton (footballer) (born 1994), English footballer
- Jim Bolton (historian), English medieval economic historian

In fiction:

- James "Jambo" Bolton, Hollyoaks character
- James Bolton, character in The Love Hermit
