= Holton (surname) =

Holton is a surname. Notable people with the surname include:

- Brian Holton, baseball player
- Cliff Holton, English footballer
- David Holton, professor of Modern Greek
- DeShaun Holton (1973-2006), musician/rapper
- Edward D. Holton, American politician and businessman
- Gary Holton, actor and musician
- Gary Holton (linguist), American linguist
- Gerald Holton, professor of physics
- Hart Benton Holton, American politician
- Henry Dwight Holton, American physician and politician from Vermont
- Jim Holton, football player
- Linwood Holton (1923–2021), American politician from Virginia
- Luther Hamilton Holton, politician and businessman
- Michael Holton (born 1961), American basketball player and coach
- Mark Holton, actor
- Pat Holton, football player
- Paul Holton (born 1993), American racing driver
- Richard Holton, British philosopher
- Richard H. Holton (1926–2005), American economist
- Robert A. Holton (1944–2025), American chemist and academic
- Tyler Holton, American baseball player
- Woody Holton, historian

== See also ==
- Houlton (disambiguation)
- Bolton (surname)
- Colton (surname)
