= Holton =

Holton may refer to:

== Places ==
In the United Kingdom:

- Holton, Oxfordshire
- Holton, Somerset
- Holton, Suffolk (also known as Holton St Peter to distinguish it from Holton St Mary)
- Holton, Vale of Glamorgan
- Holton-le-Clay, Lincolnshire
- Holton le Moor, Lincolnshire

In the United States:

- Holton, California, Los Angeles County
- Holton, California, former name of Holtville, California, Imperial County
- Holton, Indiana
- Holton, Kansas
- Holton Township, Michigan
- Holton, Wisconsin

== Other uses ==
- Holton (surname)

== See also ==
- Frank Holton Company, makers of the "Holton" trumpet, trombone, French horn, and euphonium
- Holton-Arms School, a private girls' school in Bethesda, Maryland, near Washington, D.C.
- Houlton (disambiguation)
