= Senator Holton =

Senator Holton may refer to:

- Hart Benton Holton (1835–1907), Maryland State Senate
- Henry Dwight Holton (1838–1917), Vermont State Senate

== See also ==
- Samuel Holten (1738–1816), Massachusetts State Senate
