= Booton =

Booton may refer to:

== People ==
- Booton (surname)

== Places ==
- Booton, Norfolk
- Booton, West Virginia

== See also ==
- Boonton, New Jersey
- Buton, an island of Indonesia
