= Booton (surname) =

Booton is a surname. Notable people with the surname include:

- Harold Booton (1906–1976), English footballer
- Joseph Booton (actor) (born 1987), British actor and puppeteer
- Joseph F. Booton (1897–1983), American architect and painter
- Walter Booton (born 1941), Irish cricketer

== See also ==
- Bolton (surname)
