= Pauls (dairy) =

Australian dairy brand name

- Pauls logo used during the 1970s and 1980s
- Industry: Dairy industry
- Headquarters: South Brisbane, Australia
- Owner: Parmalat
- Parent: Lactalis
- Website: www.pauls.com.au

Pauls is an Australian brand name of dairy products whose history can be traced back to 1923. Currently based in South Brisbane, the company has been known by several names, including Queensland United Foods Ltd (QUF), Pauls Ice Cream & Milk Ltd and Pauls Limited.

In 2003, five years after the Italian firm Parmalat acquired it, Pauls Limited officially changed its name to Parmalat Australia Ltd. Today, Pauls is a brand under the Parmalat umbrella, which is a subsidiary of the French multinational Lactalis.

== History ==
=== Origins ===
The company was registered as Pauls Polar Perfections Pty Limited on 13 June 1933 with paid up capital of £900 by Edward Stokes, who was still involved in 1951 as managing director of the operating company Pauls Ice Cream and Milk Ltd. The name has been written as Pauls, Paul's, and Pauls'.

=== 1930s ===
The company in 1933 sponsored the Pauls' 4BC Party at the Brisbane City Hall.

In 1937, the North Rockhampton premises of Paul's Polar Perfections Pty Ltd suffered notable damage due to a fire.

Pauls Polar Perfections Limited went from being a proprietary concern to a publicly listed company. With its cold storage, the company also embraced fruit syrup manufacture and required new equipment. Directors of the company are Messieurs G. Andrew (wholesale milk vendor), T. W. Biggs (solicitor), W. A. Jolly MHR (accountant), and E. Stokes (managing).

Subject to the regulations of the Brisbane Milk Board, suppliers' milk was subjected to chemical analysis, and examination for bacteria. Pauls Ice Cream and Milk Ltd was now registered as a wholesale milk vendor.

The Milk Supply Act came into existence in late 1939.

=== 1940s ===
The company still only young in 1946 wrote about its origins, Pauls Ice Cream & Milk Ltd.: a history.

Many companies benefited from transportation contracts with Pauls, including Bill Bolton's Cobb & Co. Redman Transport across the Darling Downs.

Pauls Milk and Ice Cream Ltd planned a £150,000 construction and plant extension to create powdered milk. It meant milk suppliers did not need to sell excess supplies to butter factories. In the post war period, steel supply however was considered an issue that might delay construction.

In the late 1940s and 1950s Pauls milk was delivered in a glass bottle with a characteristic squared shape and gold-colored metal cap, which first appeared in July 1948.

A job with the company included staff superannuation and social amenities. Employees were employed under the Ice Making, Ice-cream Making, and Cold Storage Award, Southern Division (Eastern District), where the union was seeking to change the temperature of a freezer room to 1 °C (32 °F), and workers would not start before 6.00 am.

=== 1950s ===
Pauls Milk Ltd in 1953 commenced building two powdered milk processing plants at South Brisbane, Brisbane. Its benefits included assistance to those persons on non-fat diets, assisting persons in remote areas unable to access fresh milk, cooking versatility, and another option when whole milk shortages occurred.

Various Pauls depots existed around Brisbane including at the suburbs of Rocklea and Coorparoo.

Several other milk companies in Brisbane at the time included the United Milk Vendors Pty Ltd and United Vendors' Milk Distributors.

Pauls was from around 1956 the dominant supplier of milk products to Darwin, where for many years they had a batching plant for producing reconstituted milk, combined with some locally sourced fresh milk, for supply to the "Top End".

=== 2020s ===
In January 2020 the company was awarded a Queensland Health tender to supply the Metro North Hospital and Health Service with milk, yoghurt and other products. A small public protest indicated Maleny Dairy should have been favoured under the government procurement policy of 'Buy Queensland' local purchasing, as Pauls was part of the French-based Lactalis company.

During the course of its history, Pauls product line has evolved. At one time it also produced ice cream but at present concentrates on dairy lines such as milk and cream, custard, yoghurt, and a line of milk and juice beverages.

== Awards ==
Queensland United Foods (QUF) was inducted into the Queensland Business Leaders Hall of Fame in 2013, in recognition of its success as a listed Queensland public company and its outstanding contribution to the national dairy industry through innovations in production technology, products and marketing.

== Gallery ==
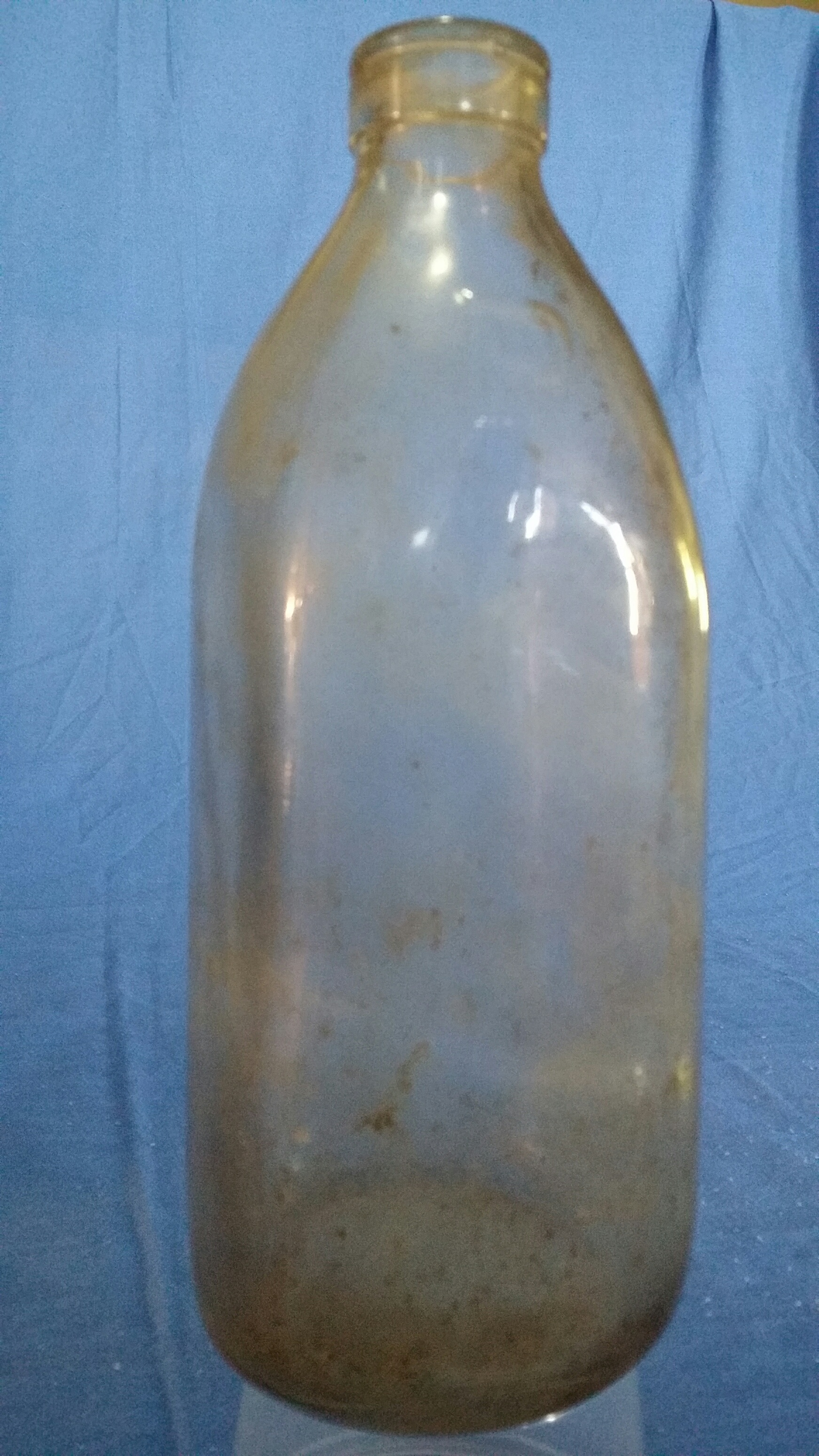
Pauls Darwin quart milk bottle

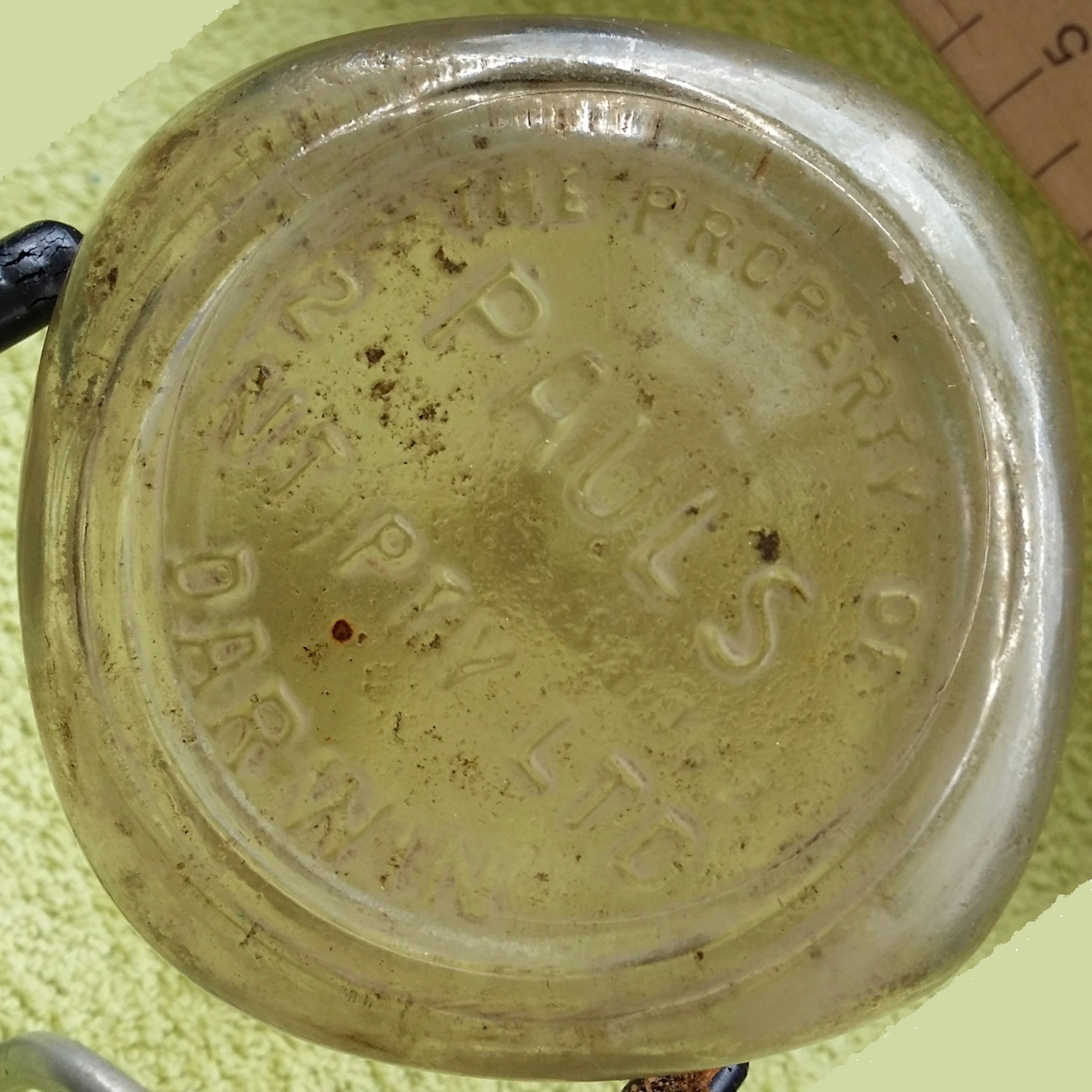
Pauls Darwin quart milk bottle base

Pauls old logo seen during the 1980s

Images inside the working factory at South Brisbane in the 2010s are also available from the '31361 Dean Saffron Paul's milk factory photographs' collection of the State Library of Queensland.

== See also ==
- Dairy farming in Australia
