= Thomas Bloodworth =

English merchant and Lord Mayor of London (1620–1682)

Sir Thomas Bloodworth

Lord Mayor of London
- In office October 1665 – October 1666
- Preceded by: John Lawrence
- Succeeded by: William Bolton

Member of Parliament for Southwark
- In office 1660–1679
- Preceded by: George Thomson; Andrew Brewer
- Succeeded by: Richard How; Peter Rich

Personal details
- Born: Thomas Bildward c. February 1620
- Died: 12 May 1682 (aged 62)
- Spouse(s): Mary Rodgers Mary Benn (m. 1657)
- Children: 8

Sir Thomas Bloodworth (né Blidward; baptised 13 February 1620 – 12 May 1682) was an English merchant and politician who sat in the House of Commons from 1660 to 1679. He was Lord Mayor of London from October 1665 to October 1666 and his inaction during the early stages of the Great Fire of London was widely criticised as one of the causes of the great extent of the damage to the city.

== Background ==
Bloodworth was the son of Edward Blidward, yeoman of Heanor, Derbyshire and was baptised on 13 February 1620. In 1635, he was apprenticed to a London vintner and became a member of the mercantile guild the Company of Vintners. He became a Turkey merchant i.e. a member of the Levant Company or Turkey Company, an English chartered company formed in 1581 to conduct English trade with Turkey and the Levant or its successors, dissolved in 1825 and is any merchant dealing in the same geographic area or in similar goods. He was primarily a timber merchant. He was a member of the committee of the East India Company (E.I.C.) from 1651 to 1661, and one of the Court Assistants for the Levant Company from 1652 to 1665. In 1658, he was elected an alderman of the City of London for Dowgate ward. In 1660, he was elected Member of Parliament for Southwark in the Convention Parliament. He was knighted on 16 May 1660. He was a member of the Honourable Artillery Company in 1659, Colonel of the Orange Regiment of London Trained Bands in 1659-60 and a colonel of their Yellow Regiment from 1660 to 1682. In 1661, he was re-elected MP for Southwark for the Cavalier Parliament. He became an alderman for Portsoken ward in 1662, and was a member of the committee of the E.I.C. from 1662 to 1663. In 1663, he served as one of the two sheriffs of London. He was alderman of Aldersgate from 1663 to 1682, and was on the committee of the E.I.C. again from 1664 to 1665. In 1665, he was Master of the Vintners Company.

== Great Fire of London ==
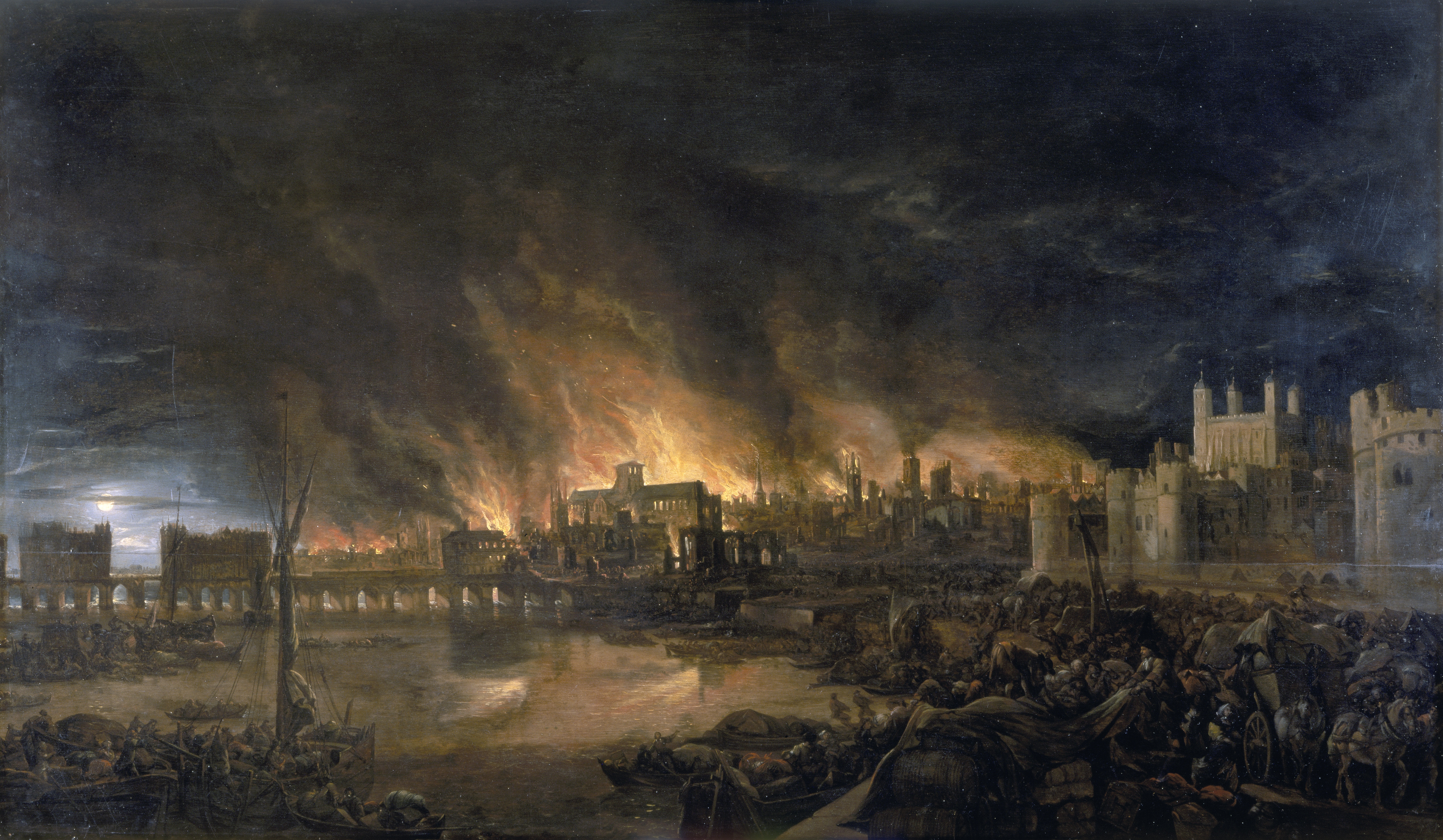
The Great Fire of London, depicted by an unknown painter (1675), as it would have appeared from a boat in the vicinity of Tower Wharf on the evening of Tuesday, 4 September 1666. To the left is London Bridge; to the right, the Tower of London. St. Paul's Cathedral is in the distance, surrounded by the tallest flames.

Bloodworth became the 330th Lord Mayor of London in November 1665. In the early hours of 2 September 1666, a fire broke out in the house of Thomas Farriner (sometimes spelt Farynor), a baker. The methods of firefighting at the time included the use of long sticks with hooks on the end, which were used to pull down buildings adjacent to those burning. This was meant to contain the fire by removing material it could spread to. However, this was also the destruction of property and was considered a serious matter, so the Mayor was summoned to permit it to take place.

When Bloodworth arrived, he refused to allow the demolition to take place. Possibly, this was due to fear of complaints from the owners of the buildings which would be destroyed that such actions were unnecessary. According to Samuel Pepys' record of the events, he expressed a lack of concern that the fire would become dangerous, saying that "a woman might piss it out," before returning to his home and going back to sleep. Over the next three days, the fire destroyed more than 15 per cent of the city.

Bloodworth was widely blamed for the failure to stop the fire, however, he appears to have been made a scapegoat. Without the King's authority, he could not pull down houses without being personally responsible for the cost of rebuilding them, and he was also faced with stiff resistance from the aldermen.

Bloodworth continued to sit in parliament until 1679 and was one of the Court Assistants of the Levant Company from 1673 to 1675. He died in May 1682, aged 62, and was buried at Leatherhead, Surrey.

Pepys wrote of Bloodworth as "a silly man, I think" (30 June 1666) and "a very weak man he seems to be" (1 December 1666). He was described as "a zealous person in the King's concernments; willing though it may be not very able, to do great things". Dr. Scott gave his funeral sermon in which he said "he had a mighty affection and zeal for the King and for the Church of England".

== Family ==
Bloodworth married:

Firstly Mary Rogers, daughter of Walter Rogers, a leather seller in London and Leatherhead and had two sons and a daughter.

Secondly, on 6 January 1657, Mary Benn, widow of Henry Benn, slopseller of London and daughter of a boat-builder called Butcher, and had two sons and three daughters.

His daughter Anne married firstly Sir John Jones, and secondly George Jeffreys, 1st Baron Jeffreys, James II's Lord Chief Justice and Lord Chancellor, and was ancestress of the Earls of Pomfret. She had the reputation of being a strong-minded woman, of whom even her formidable husband was afraid. A popular ballad joked that while St. George had killed a dragon, Sir George (Jeffreys) had married one.

== In popular culture ==
Thomas Bloodworth is a featured character in the 2016 musical Bumblescratch.

Parliament of England
Preceded by George Thomson; Andrew Brewer	Member of Parliament for Southwark; 1660–1679; With: John Langham 1660; George Moore 1661–1665; Sir Thomas Clarges 1666–1679	Succeeded by Sir Richard How; Peter Rich
Civic offices
Preceded by Sir John Lawrence	Lord Mayor of the City of London; 1665–1666	Succeeded by William Bolton
