= David Moore (Manx politician) =

Manx politician

David Moore is a Manx politician and former chairman of the Finance Board, the forerunner to the present Treasury Minister. He was Member of the House of Keys for Peel from 1978 until his retirement in 1986. In 1985, he was appointed the last chairman of the Finance Board.

In 2007 he stood for election to the Legislative Council in the 5th round of voting against Laxey Commissioner David Owens and stood unopposed in the 6th round of voting but failed to be elected by one vote.

== Governmental positions ==
- Chairman of the Finance Board, 1985-1986
- Member of the Executive Council, 1985-1986
