= Noel Cringle =

Manx politician (1937–2021)

President of Tynwald
- In office 2000–2011
- Preceded by: Charles Kerruish
- Succeeded by: Clare Christian

Personal details
- Born: Noel Quayle Cringle; 16 December 1937 Isle of Man
- Died: 28 August 2021 (aged 83)

Noel Quayle Cringle OBE (16 December 1937 – 28 August 2021) was President of Tynwald, the legislature of the Isle of Man, from 2000 to 2011.

Cringle was born and raised in Ballabeg, educated at Castle Rushen High School and became a farmer and later an auctioneer (Central Marts Limited). Married to Mary, with two sons. He was an Arbory Parish Commissioner from 1964 to 1974. He was first elected a Member of the House of Keys in 1974 as a member for Rushen. He lost his seat in 1986, whilst Chairman of the Home Affairs Board, but regained it in 1991, continuing as a Member for Rushen until 2000. From 1996 to 2000 he was Speaker of the House of Keys. From 2000 to 2011 he was President of Tynwald, and thus a member of the Legislative Council.

He was appointed Officer of the Order of the British Empire (OBE) in the 2008 New Year Honours. He died on 28 August 2021 at the age of 83.

== Governmental positions ==
- Member of the Executive Council, 1978–1981
- Chairman of the Board of Social Security, 1976–1982
- Chairman of the Home Affairs Board, 1982–1986
- Member of the Executive Council, 1982–1986
- Chairman of the Telecommunications Commission, 1984–1986
- Chairman of the Civil Service Commission, 1992–1996
- Minister of Education, 1995–1996

== Other positions ==
- Chairman IOM Sports Council 1982–1987
- Chairman Manx Music Festival 1984–
- Treasurer Manx National Farmers Union 1969–2000
- President Manx Harriers Athletic Club
- Trustee Colby AFC
- Life Member Laa Columb Killey
- Life Member Island Games Association

== See also ==
- Tynwald
