= Charles Colton =

Charles Colton may refer to:

- Charles H. Colton (1848–1915), clergyman in New York State, Bishop of Buffalo
- Charles Erastus Colton, American architect
- Charles Caleb Colton (1780–1831), English cleric, writer and collector
- Charles A. Colton, President of New Jersey Institute of Technology, 1881–1918
