= Norman Crowe =

Manx politician

Edgar Norman Crowe OBE (known as Norman) (1905 – 1992) was Chairman of the Executive Council from 1967 until 1971. He was also previously Chairman of the Finance Board.
