= Powel J. Smith =

American businessman and politician (1874–1942)

Powel J. Smith (November 10, 1874 – August 10, 1942) was an American businessman and politician from Glens Falls, New York.

== Life ==
Smith was born on November 10, 1874, in Glens Falls, New York, the son of school teacher John Smith and Lucinda Ross of Bolton Landing.

Smith attended the village schools and graduated from Albany Business College in 1891. He returned to Glens Falls and worked for the Delaware and Hudson Railway as a bookkeeper, later joining the Hudson Valley Railway as a paymaster and auditor. He then became paymaster for the construction of the Elmira, Corning and Waverly Railway. He returned to Glens Falls in 1900 and became a partner with John Lavery Jr. in a grocery store. He became a successful businessman and was associated with, among other businesses the Empire Automobile Company, Comac Sales, Inc., the Hall Ice Cream Company, Glens Falls Pharmacal Company, John Liddle, Inc., and Redwood Stores, Inc.

Smith was a councilman of the third ward for two years. In 1926, he was elected to the New York State Assembly as a Democrat, representing Warren County. He was elected over Republican incumbent Richard J. Bolton. He served in the Assembly in 1927. A dry Democrat, he was the sole Democrat to vote against a resolution that called for Congress to stop the poisoning of industrial alcohol. He was the first Democrat to represent Warren County in the Assembly for thirty years. He lost the 1927 re-election to Republican Paul L. Boyce. He ran again for the Assembly in 1929, but again lost the election to Boyce.

Smith was president of the Board of Education of Union Free School District No. 1. In 1931, Mayor Earle H. Stickney appointed him to the Board of Water Commissioners. He was reappointed to the Board in 1935 by Mayor W. Irving Griffin. He served as a director and president of the Glens Falls Hospital for several years, and at one point was on the City Planning Commission. In 1939, he became City Chamberlain, an office he held until his death.

Smith was a member of the First Baptist Church of Glens Falls and served as chairman of its board of trustees for many years. He was also chairman of the board of trustees of the YMCA and a member of the Freemasons, the Elks, and the Rotary Club.

Smith died from a heart attack while on his way home from City Hall on August 10, 1942. Rev. W. Gordon Poole of the First Baptist Church and retired pastor Rev. Dr. P. H. McDowell officiated his funeral service at his home. The active and honorary pallbearers included city and county officials. He was buried in the family plot in Glens Falls Cemetery.

New York State Assembly
Preceded by Richard J. Bolton	New York State Assembly; Warren County; 1927	Succeeded by Paul L. Boyce
