= Queensland Museum Cobb+Co =

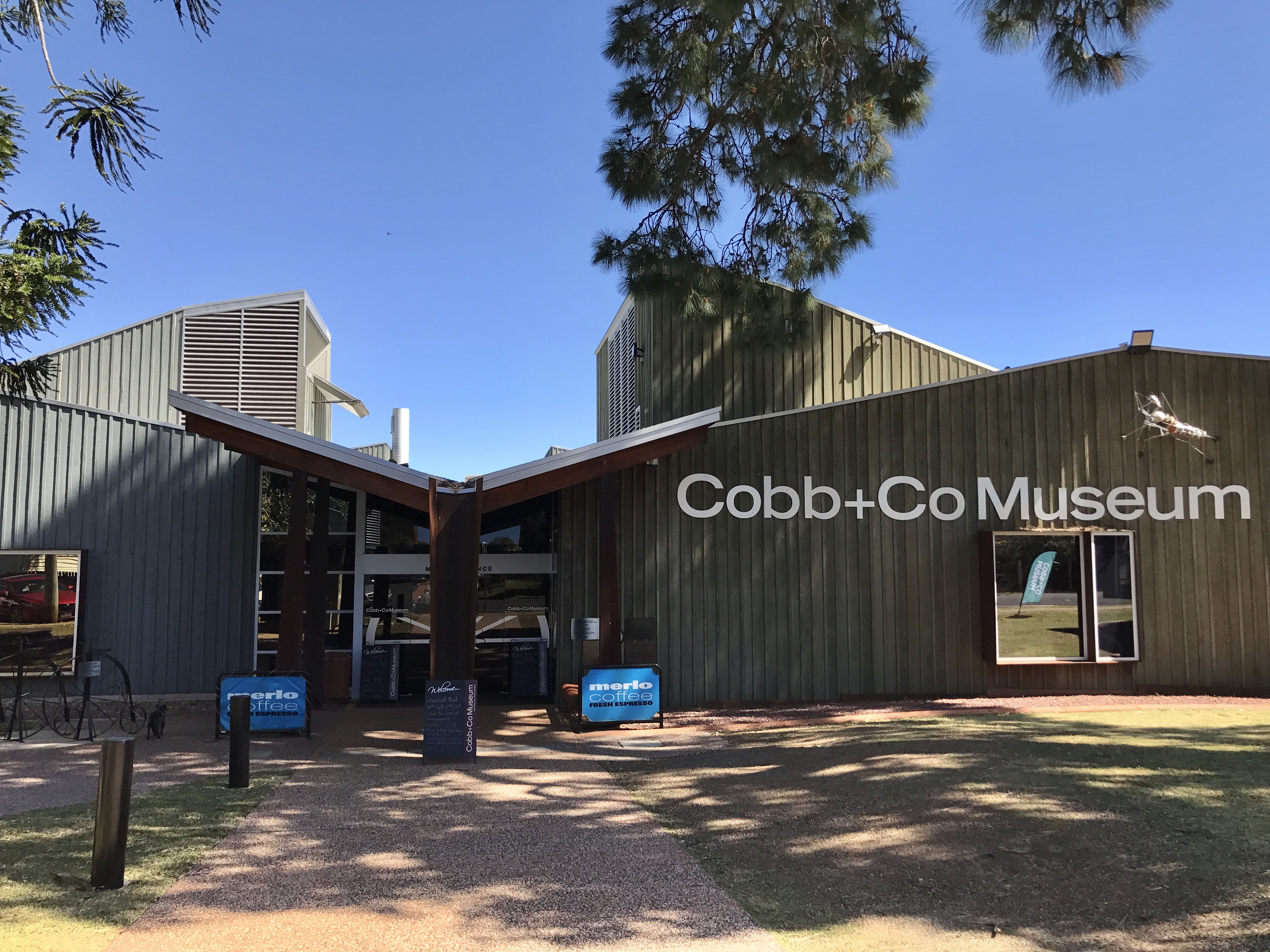
- Cobb & Co Museum, 2017
- Established: 1987
- Location: 27 Lindsay Street, Toowoomba
- Coordinates: 27.5554°S 151.9646°E
- Type: History museum
- Website: Queensland Museum Cobb+Co website

The Queensland Museum Cobb+Co (formerly the Cobb+Co Museum) is at 27 Lindsay Street, Toowoomba, Queensland, Australia. It is part of the Queensland Museum Network.

== History ==
The museum was originally established to house The Cobb & Co. Collection of W. R. F. Bolton consisting of over thirty 19th century horse-drawn vehicles which he collected and had restored over a period of more than thirty years. This Collection also includes over one hundred artifacts, comprising saddles, machinery, tools, and items of domestic and occupational use. The expansion of the museum over time, with the addition and consolidation of other collections, has led to the museum becoming internationally recognised as housing The National Carriage Collection.

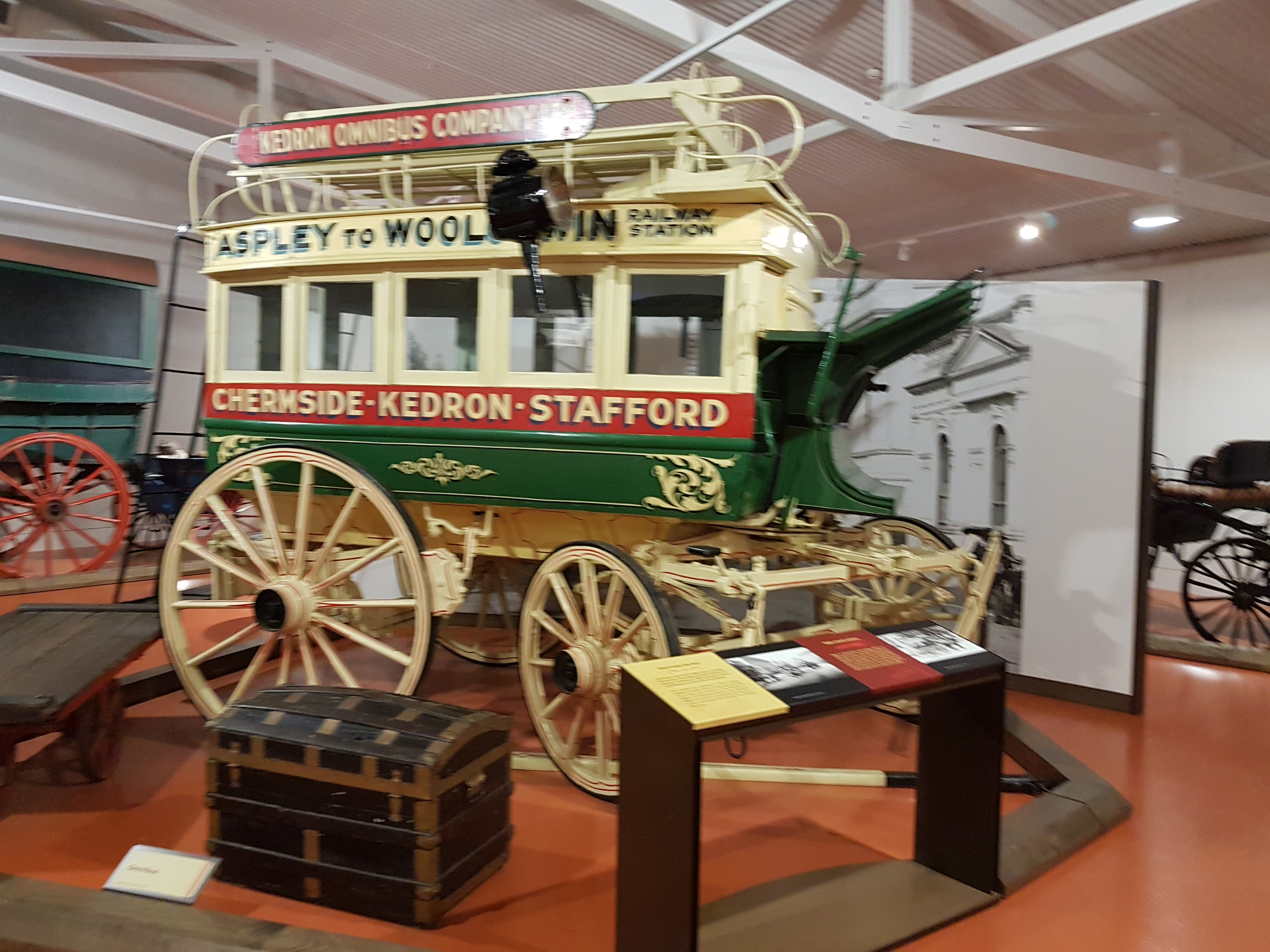
Wagons in the museum, 2018

The Collection was originally on display in Toowoomba at the premises of Cobb & Co. Limited, Mr Bolton's road transport company, from 1965 until 1981. Jenny Cardell, Mr Bolton's daughter, and her husband, Adrian Cardell, purchased the Collection through their company Banks Pty. Ltd. in 1980. They then entered into protracted negotiations with the Queensland Government to donate the Collection to the Queensland Museum on the condition that the Collection would be housed at Toowoomba in a purpose-built building.

A formal Deed of Gift which provided that the museum

would attempt to develop the Museum in the longer term as a specialized branch of the Queensland Museum in the Eastern Darling Downs area for the benefit of the people in the area from which the Collection was largely drawn was finally entered into in 1982. The museum also gave its assurance that the Collection will be regarded as a memorial to Mr. W. R. F. Bolton and the pioneers of transportation in the State of Queensland and that, in the light of that objective, the museum will treat the necessity to preserve the Collection intact as its primary responsibility.

== See also ==
- Cobb & Co
- List of museums in Queensland
