= Harry Bolton (American football) =

American football player (1919–1986)

- Harry Bolton, 1936

Profile
- Position: Tackle

Personal information
- Born: March 24, 1919; Gray Horse, Oklahoma
- Died: July 1, 1986 (aged 67); Fairfax, Oklahoma
- Listed height: 6 ft 3 in (1.91 m)
- Listed weight: 280 lb (127 kg)

Career information
- College: Oklahoma A&M

Career history
- Detroit Lions (1944)

Career statistics
- Games: 1
- Stats at Pro Football Reference

Harry Bolton (March 24, 1919 – July 1, 1986) was an American football player.

Bolton was born in 1919 in Gray Horse, Oklahoma. He was an Osage Indian. As a teenager, he participated in the national skeet shooting tournament in 1935 and 1936. He finished fourth in 1935. He played college football for Oklahoma A&M in 1941. He then worked as a farmer in 1942 and 1943.

In 1944, he played professional football in the National Football League (NFL) as a tackle for the Detroit Lions. When he joined the Lions, he was forced to attend workouts in civilian clothes and shoes as the club did not have a uniform large enough for his 300-pound frame. Because of his mental effort, he was given the nickname "Little Beaver" while with the Lions. He appeared in one NFL game during the 1944 season.
