= George Colton =

George Colton may refer to:

- George Radcliffe Colton (1865–1916), governor of Puerto Rico
- George Colton (Maryland politician) (1817–1898), American politician, printer and newspaperman
- George H. Colton (1818–1847), American newspaper editor

== See also ==
- G. G. Coulton (1858–1947), British historian
