= Benjamin Bolton =

English cricketer

Benjamin Charles Bolton (23 September 1862 – 18 November 1910) was an English first-class cricketer, who made four appearances for Yorkshire County Cricket Club in 1890 and 1891.

Born in Cottingham, near Hull, Bolton played for Hull Town C.C. for many years from 1882, and captained the side in the 1890s and again in 1904. He first played for Hornsea and East Holderness C.C. versus Hessle C.C. in 1877, aged 14, and first played for Yorkshire Colts in 1883. In 1894 he took 9–9 in a match for Hornsea and was highly thought of as a fast bowler.

He was a right arm fast medium bowler, who claimed 13 first-class wickets at just 19.38. He had a fine debut match against Gloucestershire in Dewsbury in 1890, bagging 4 for 63 in an innings and 7 for 105 in the match, although the visitors ran out winners by 84 runs. His first victim in first-class cricket was W. G. Grace. He then played against Kent and, in his last match of the season, claimed a career best of 5 for 40 against Sussex.

He reappeared in 1891 against Surrey, but took only 1 for 73 as Yorkshire lost by an innings, and was not asked to play again. As a right-handed tail end batsman, he scored 25 runs at an average of 4.16, with a best score of 11.

He also played for Yorkshire Second XI in 1900.

He was also a runner, heavyweight boxer, rugby footballer, billiards player and a good shot. A commission agent in business, he was an amateur musician and an exhibitor of roses. He died in Hull Infirmary, after falling from an express train near Brough, aged 48. He is buried in Hornsea Cemetery.
