= Werner von Bolton =

German chemist and materials scientist (1868–1912)

Werner von Bolton (8 April 1868 – 28 October 1912) was a German chemist and materials scientist. In 1902 he devised a technique for producing filaments for incandescent light bulbs made of tantalum.

== Life ==
Werner von Bolton was born in Tiflis, Russian Empire. He went on to study Chemistry at the Technische Hochschule Berlin and in Leipzig. Post-Graduation, von Bolton worked at the company Siemens & Halske in Berlin. In 1895 he achieved his doctorate.

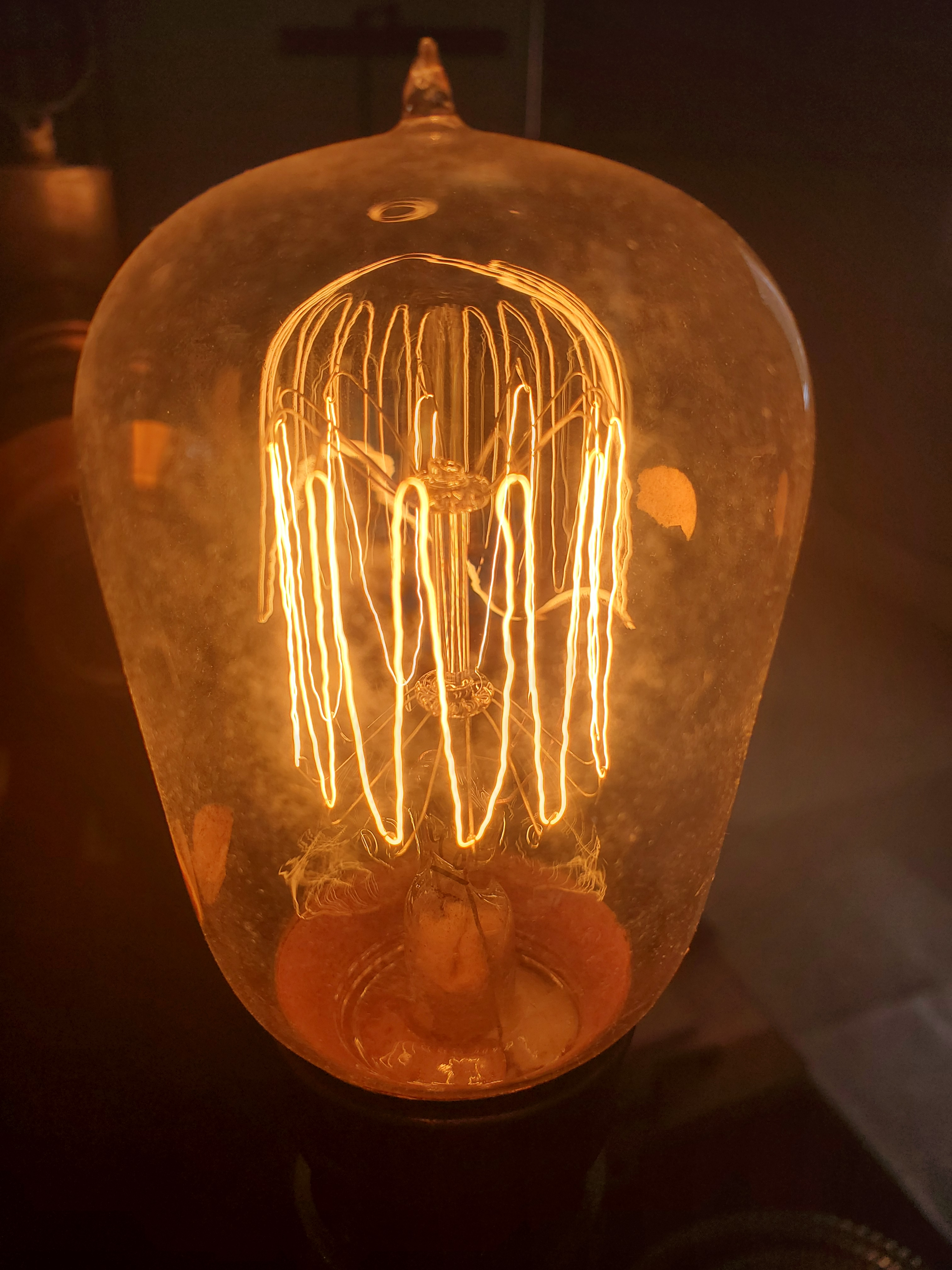
A tantalum lamp with a 1 meter long filament.

In 1902 von Bolton detected the benefits of using Tantalum as a material in the production of filaments. Tantalum allowed for a greater luminosity with lower energy consumption when compared with previous alternatives such as coal.

In 1905, Siemens & Halske awarded von Bolton the position of director of the first central laboratory of the company, later the Physics and Chemistry laboratory.

After 1910, the bulbs with a tantalum filament were replaced by those with a tungsten filament.

Von Bolton died in Berlin on 28 October 1912. He is honoured with the Boltonstraße, a street named after him in Siemensstadt, an area of Berlin's Spandau district.
