= William Colton (disambiguation) =

William Colton is an American politician.

William Colton may also refer to:

- William Paul Colton, Bishop of Cork, Cloyne and Ross
- William Robert Colton (1867–1921), British sculptor
- William F. Colton, namesake of Colton, Utah
- William Colton, a character in The Loner
- Billy Colton, a character in The Coltons
