= Leslie Bolton =

Danish footballer (1909-1986)

Personal information
- Date of birth: 22 November 1909
- Place of birth: Gentofte, Denmark
- Date of death: 4 December 1986 (aged 77)
- Position: Defender

International career
Years	Team	Apps	(Gls)
1938	Denmark	1	(0)

Leslie Bolton (22 November 1909 – 4 December 1986) was a Danish footballer. He played in one match for the Denmark national football team in 1938.
