= Jenny Bolton =

British ice hockey player

Jennifer "Jenny" Bolton (born 22 September 1992 in Sheffield, South Yorkshire, England) is an English ice hockey player. She plays as defence for the Great Britain women's national ice hockey team and for the Chelmsford Cobras.
