= Houlton =

Houlton may refer to:

- Houlton, Maine, American town
  - Houlton (CDP), Maine, census-designated place within the Town of Houlton
- Houlton, Wisconsin, American unincorporated community
- Houlton, Warwickshire, housing development near Rugby, England

== People with the surname ==
- D. J. Houlton, Major League Baseball pitcher
- Gerard Houlton (born 1939), English cricketer
- Sir John Houlton (1892–1973), British-Swazi civil servant and politician
- John Houlton (1922–1996), New Zealand flying ace of the Second World War

== See also ==
- Holton (disambiguation)
