= Frederic Bolton =

Sir Frederic Bolton
- Born: 7 March 1851; Islington, London, England
- Died: 25 January 1920 (aged 68); Hampstead, London, England
- Occupations: Shipowner and underwriter
- Title: Chairman, Lloyd’s of London
- Term: 1906

Sir Frederic Bolton (1851–1920) was an English shipowner and underwriter, he was elected Chairman of Lloyd's of London in 1906.

== Early life and ship owner ==
Frederic Bolton was born in Islington, London, on 7 March 1851. He founded and became chairman of the Bolton Steam Shipping Company.

== Underwriter and war work ==
In 1878 he became an underwriter at Lloyd's of London and was elected chairman in 1906. He was knighted in 1908. At LLoyd's he worked on the question of the food supply from overseas during war and at the outbreak of the First World War he worked at the Admiralty in connection with protecting overseas trade. He was knighted in the 1908 Birthday Honours. At the end of the war he moved to the Ministry of Shipping until his death. Bolton died on 25 January 1920 in the Hampstead area of London, aged 68.
