= Steve Bolton (entrepreneur) =

British businessman and writer

- Born: 18 December 1967 (age 57); Bournemouth, Dorset, England
- Known for: Founder of the Bolt group of companies

Steve Bolton (born 18 December 1967) is a British entrepreneur and the founder of the Bolt group of companies.

== Early life ==
Bolton was born in Bournemouth, Dorset, and lived in Durban, South Africa, between the ages of two and five. Bolton’s father Ronnie Bolton originates from Lancashire and is a former soccer player for AFC Bournemouth, Ipswich Town and Durban City.

== Early career ==
Bolton joined a new company, Ropes Course Developments (RCD), as a director and shareholder aged 27. RCD developed safety standards for the construction and training of ropes courses in the UK. Steve Bolton, Nick Moriarty and Melanie Moriarty set up the first national association for rope course safety, which received backing from government and industry and led to a significant growth in the sector, with RCD becoming the recognised European market leaders by 1997. RCD went on to build adventure ropes courses for Center Parcs, First Choice Holidays, Outward Bound, the Royal Air Force and many others across Europe and in South Africa.

Bolton founded Vision Development Training in 1997, providing outdoor team, management and organisational development programmes. In 2001 RCD went into liquidation. Bolton was forced to sell his family home in Dorset to avoid bankruptcy in 2002. In 2002, Bolton set up a drop shipping business and became the European licensee for Mobile Team Challenge (MTC). Bolton later sold the company to his Managing Director.

=== Property investment ===
Bolton began purchasing houses in Bournemouth and turning them into let Houses in Multiple Occupation (HMOs). Bolton bought more than £6 million worth of residential property between 2004 and 2007, providing shared living homes for more than 80 tenants.

=== Platinum Property Partners ===
Bolton founded his first franchised business, Platinum Property Partners, in 2007, with Franchise Partners following Bolton’s business model and building portfolios of HMOs. More than 7,000 tenants now live in Platinum Franchise Partners’ properties, with more than £400m of property purchased by Partners since 2007. Bolton exited Platinum and his other property interests between 2017 and 2020.

=== Bolt Digital ===
In 2017, Bolton formed a new business with media and marketing entrepreneur and former journalist Natasha Courtenay-Smith, to launch direct-to-consumer (D2C) performance marketing agency Bolt Digital. The agency works predominantly with brands in the e-commerce sector, helping them to scale D2C strategy and sales.

=== Bolt Brands and Buddy & Lola ===
Bolton and Courtenay-Smith, along with colleagues David Bell and Luke Courtenay-Smith, launched Bolt Brands in 2020 with the aim of acquiring and scaling direct-to-consumer (D2C) brands. The first acquisition was made in January 2020 with a dog supplement brand called Buddy & Lola.

== Axe the Tenant Tax ==
In 2016 Bolton co-founded and continues to lead a grassroots not-for-profit campaign called Axe the Tenant Tax.

Bolton united the private rented sector of the United Kingdom by forming a coalition of major organisations who are opposed to new government legislation that restricts landlords’ ability to deduct mortgage finance costs as a business expense. Coalition stakeholders represent more than 100,000 landlords who provide housing to more than 1 million tenants in the UK.

Bolton and fellow landlord Chris Cooper were co-claimants in a Judicial Review against the UK government in relation to the legality of Section 24 of the Finance (No. 2) Act 2015. Their legal team was led by Cherie Blair CBE QC and their legal challenge campaign broke two legal crowdfunding records in 2016 by raising over £200,000 within the fastest recorded timeframe.

The ‘Axe the Tenant Tax’ campaign achieved wide-spread national media coverage, and Bolton met with the housing Minister, the Chancellor of the Exchequer and MPs. Bolton believes the tax is a disaster for the UK housing market and is championing the cause for the small landlords and tenants who will suffer badly if this tax comes into force.

The High Court ruled against the movement in 2016 and the decision was made not to appeal. Bolton and Cooper have since focused their campaign efforts on lobbying the UK government and working with MPs and Tenant Tax coalition members to persuade the government to revisit the tax.

== Mentoring ==
For six years Bolton was a mentor for the Key Person of Influence programme, mentoring several thousand entrepreneurs and business owners during that time in a group setting.

== Philanthropy ==
Bolton is a patron of not-for-profit organisation Peace One Day, having worked with them for more than a decade and provides pro-bono mentoring and training to aspiring social-impact entrepreneurs through the Bolt group of companies. Ratified by the United Nations, Peace One Day has led to more than 13 million people living more peacefully through its quest to achieve a global ceasefire and day of non-violence every September 21. Bolton has also provided funding to the King’s Kid Orphanage in Mitiana, Uganda, with his donations leading to new housing, classrooms, water provision and the acquisition of farming land.

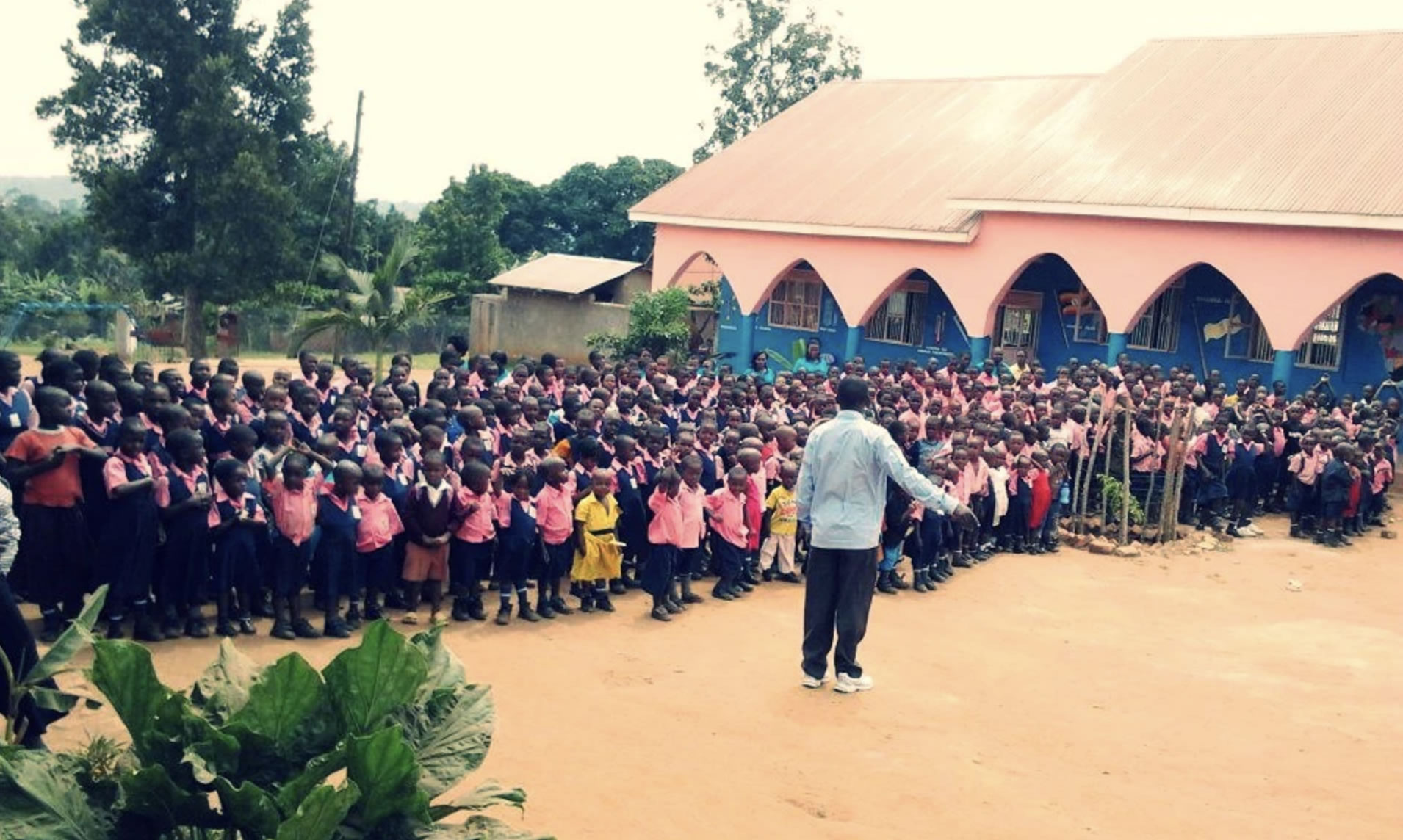
The new buildings at the King's Kid orphanage

== Published work and speaking ==
Bolton is the author of the Amazon book ‘Profitable Property Secrets’. Bolton has appeared on stage in his talk ‘Standing on the Shoulders of Giants’ with speakers such as Simon Woodroffe, James Caan, and Kriss Akabusi.

== Media appearances ==
Bolton and his businesses have appeared on BBC, Channel Four, Sky News, Financial Times, Sunday Times, The Telegraph, Guardian, Express and the Mail.

== Personal life ==
Bolton spends his time between his three homes in Poole in Dorset, White City in London, and Ibiza. He has four children and a dog called Yogi, with his interests away from business including travel, boating, football, and fishing. He has taken three months’ holiday every year since 2004 (aside from Covid when international travel was not possible.)
