= Gambier Bolton =

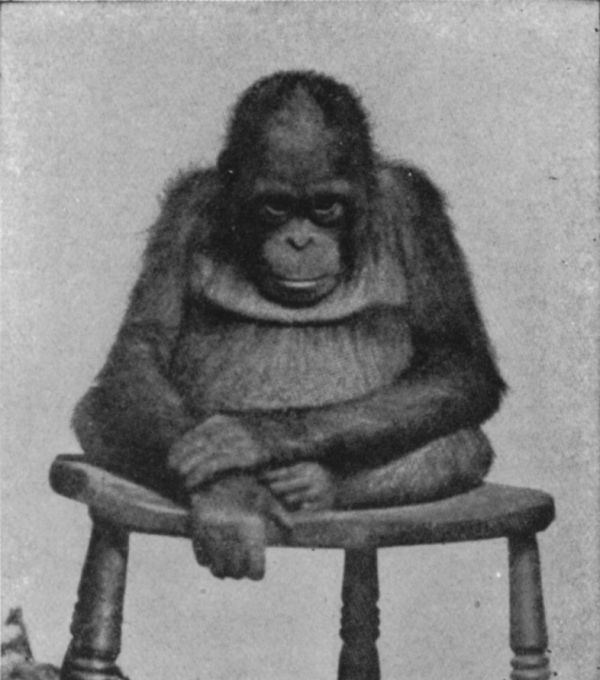
Orangutan by Gambier Bolton, from Thomson's Outline of Science

Robert Gambier Bolton (24 August 1854 – 29 July 1928) was an English author and photographer of subjects on natural history and psychical phenomena. Bolton made numerous photographs of animals during his travels to many countries, including one with the party accompanying the Duke of Newcastle on his tour. His interest in animal photography was professional, amongst the first intending to profit from this pursuit. His works are sometimes preserved as scientific records for societies, though their value was not widely recognised, and appeared in journals and books of zoology. Bolton was a Fellow of the Zoological Society of London.

He was a founding member of the club devoted to Siamese cats, founded in England in 1901.

In 1901, in conjunction with W. Watson & Sons, he designed the 'Gambier Bolton' Camera specifically for photographing animals.

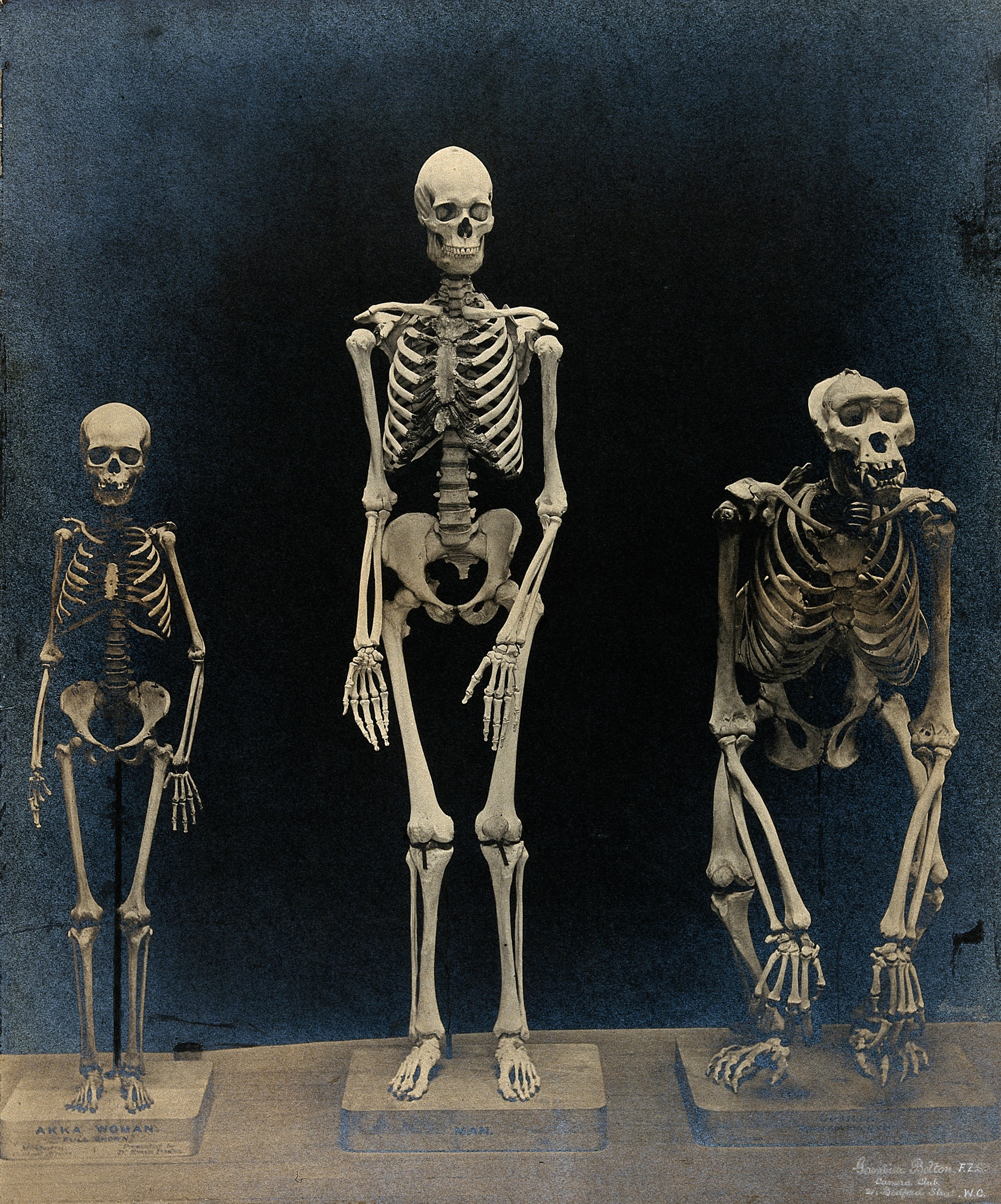
Skeleton of a man, a woman (pygmy) and a gorilla

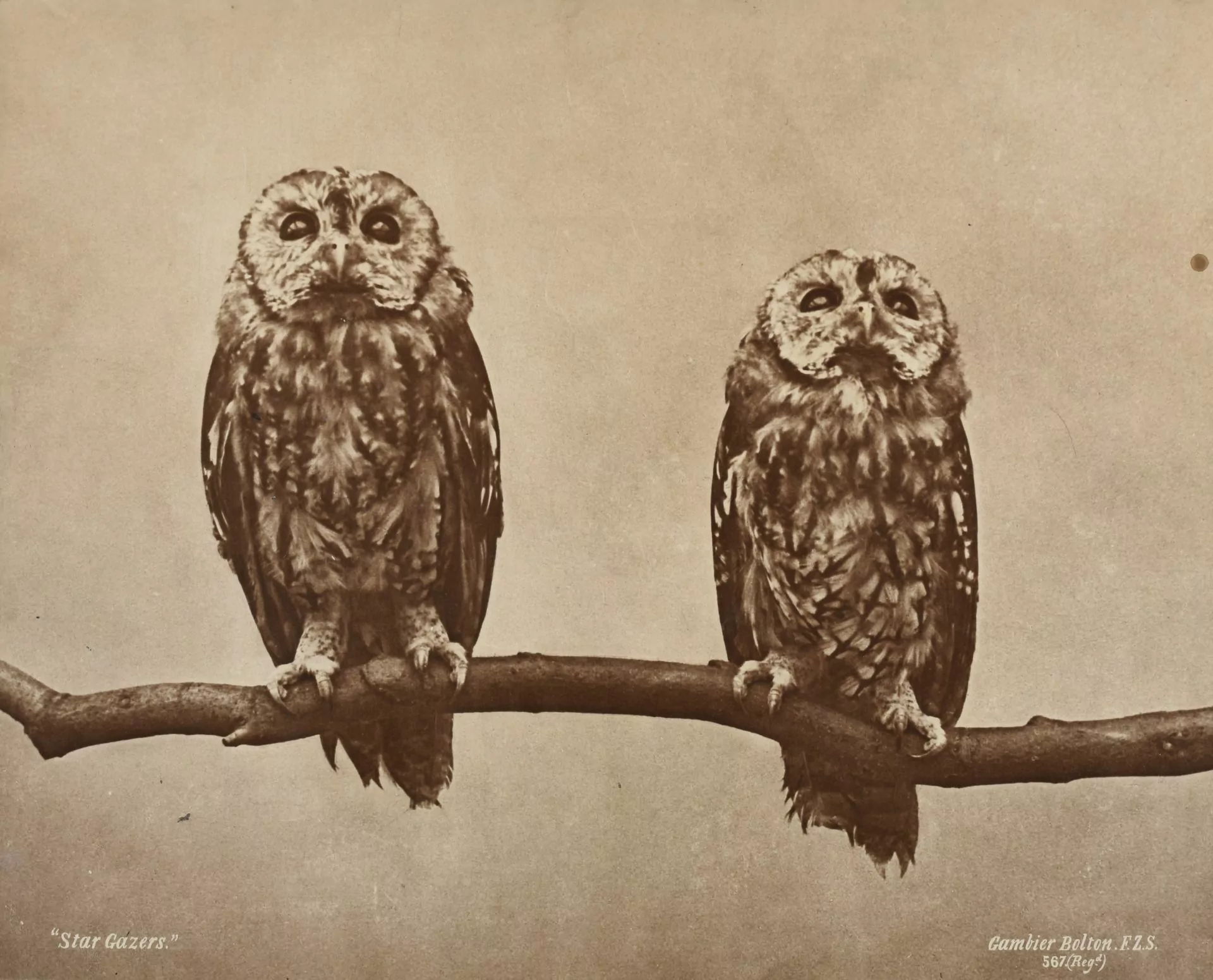
Star Gazers

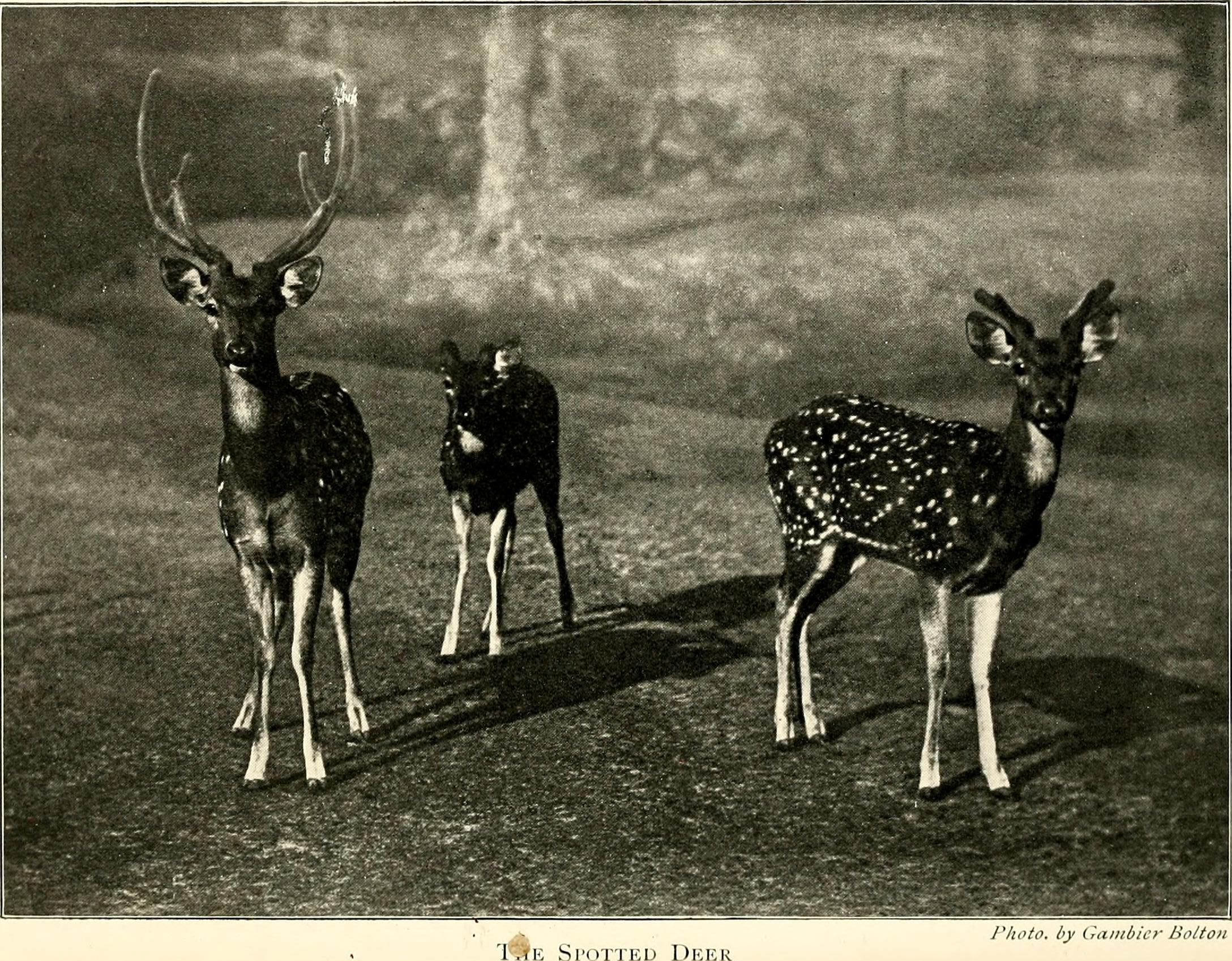
The spotted deer

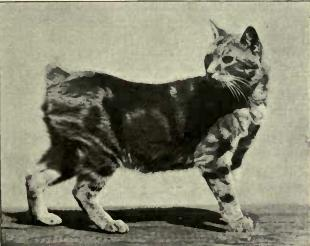
Manx cat
