= Nigel Bolton =

English footballer (born 1975)

Personal information
- Full name: Nigel Alan Bolton
- Date of birth: 14 January 1975 (age 51)
- Place of birth: Bishop Auckland, England
- Positions: Forward; midfielder

Senior career*
Years	Team	Apps	(Gls)
–1994	Shildon		
1994–1995	Darlington	2	(0)
- West Auckland Town
–2001	Tow Law Town		
2001–2004	Shildon		
2004–2006	Darlington RA		
2006	Esh Winning		
- * Club domestic league appearances and goals

Nigel Alan Bolton (born 14 January 1975) is an English former footballer who played as a forward in the Football League for Darlington.

Bolton was born in Bishop Auckland, County Durham. He began his football career with Northern League club Shildon, where he was top scorer. He then moved to Football League Third Division club Darlington, for whom he made two league appearances, of which one was as a substitute, in the 1994–95 season. He then returned to non-league football, playing for West Auckland Town and Tow Law Town before rejoining Shildon in June 2001. Bolton, by then working as a postman and playing in midfield, helped Shildon reach the first round proper of the FA Cup for the first time in more than 40 years. They were drawn to play Division Two club Notts County; Bolton played the first half and Shildon lost 7–2. He left Shildon in 2004 for Darlington Railway Athletic, and also played for Esh Winning, for whom he scored twice in his first two games.
