= John Colton =

John Colton may refer to:

- John Colton (politician) (1823–1902), Australian politician, Premier of South Australia and philanthropist
- John Colton (bishop) (c. 1320–1404), statesman and cleric in Ireland
- John Colton (screenwriter) (1887–1946), American playwright and screenwriter
