= Puddin Colton =

Australian rugby player (1874 – 1857)

- Born: Thomas Joseph Colton; 30 August 1874 Brisbane, Queensland
- Died: 13 June 1958
- Notable relative: Alfred Colton

Rugby union career
- Position: flanker
International career
Years	Team	Apps	(Points)
1904	Australia	2	(0)

Thomas Joseph "Puddin" Colton (30 August 1874 – 13 June 1958) was a rugby union player who represented Australia.

Colton, a flanker, was born in Brisbane, Queensland and claimed a total of 2 international rugby caps for Australia. His debut game was against Great Britain, at Sydney, on 2 July 1904. He was the younger brother of inaugural Australian representative player Alfred Colton.

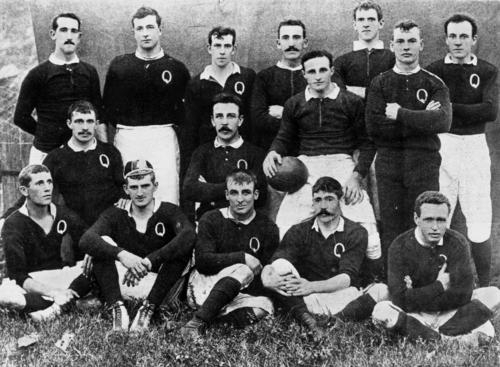
Colton appears middle row standing right, after 1 July Queensland match against the 1899 British Lions.
