= Linda Burnes Bolton =

American nurse and administrator (1948–2025)

Linda Burnes Bolton (1948 – January 11, 2025) was an American nurse and healthcare administrator. She was the vice president and chief nursing officer at Cedars-Sinai Medical Center and served as president of the American Academy of Nursing, the American Organization of Nurse Executives and the National Black Nurses Association. She was a member of the National Academy of Medicine.

== Life and career ==
Born in 1948, Burnes Bolton grew up in Tucson and became interested in nursing at the age of seven, having suffered from severe asthma and requiring frequent hospitalizations. She earned an undergraduate nursing degree from Arizona State University. She completed three graduate degrees at UCLA - master's degrees in nursing and public health and a doctorate in public health. She was the vice president for nursing, chief nursing officer, and director of nursing research at Cedars-Sinai Medical Center.

Burnes Bolton was president of the American Academy of Nursing, the American Organization of Nurse Executives (AONE) and the National Black Nurses Association. She served as vice-chair of the Institute of Medicine Committee on the Future of Nursing. She was named to the board of trustees at Case Western Reserve University in 2007. In 2012, she was elected a trustee of the Robert Wood Johnson Foundation. Burnes Bolton was on the editorial board of the American Journal of Nursing.

Before she was elected president of the AONE, the organization presented her with its Lifetime Achievement Award. In 2011, Modern Healthcare named her to its Top 25 Women in Healthcare. She received an honorary doctorate from the SUNY Upstate Medical University in 2015. That year, she was elected to the National Academy of Medicine. She won the 2016 Professional Achievement Award from the UCLA Alumni Association and was the 2016 recipient of the TRUST Award from the American Hospital Association. She died in Los Angeles on January 11, 2025, at the age of 76.
