= Walter Booton =

English cricketer (born 1941)

Personal information
- Full name: Walter Thomas Booton
- Born: 13 January 1941 (age 85); Kidderminster, Worcestershire, England
- Batting: Right-handed
- Bowling: Right-arm fast-medium

Domestic team information
- Years: Team
- 1970: Ireland

Career statistics
Competition	First-class
Matches	1
Runs scored	12
Batting average	12.00
100s/50s	–/–
Top score	12
Balls bowled	96
Wickets	2
Bowling average	36.00
5 wickets in innings	–
10 wickets in match	–
Best bowling	2/72
Catches/stumpings	–/–
- Source: Cricinfo, 10 January 2022

Walter Thomas Booton (born 13 January 1941 in Worcestershire, England) is a former English cricketer. A left-handed batsman and right-arm fast-medium bowler, he played just once for Ireland, a first-class match against Scotland in June 1970.
