= Richard J. Bolton =

American politician from New York

Member of the New York State Assembly for Warren County
- In office 1925–1926
- Preceded by: Milton N. Eldridge
- Succeeded by: Powel J. Smith

Personal details
- Born: April 16, 1875 Horicon, New York, U.S.
- Died: May 8, 1954 (aged 79) Moses-Ludington Hospital in Ticonderoga, New York
- Cause of death: Pulmonary embolism
- Resting place: Valley View Cemetery

Richard J. Bolton (April 16, 1875 – May 8, 1954) was an American hotel owner and politician from New York.

== Life ==
Bolton was born on April 16, 1875, in Horicon, New York, the son of Richard Bolton and Lura Waters. His father was an immigrant from Yorkshire, England who worked in the lumber business.

After Bolton finished school, he spent eight years working as a lumberman in the woods, followed by two years as a miner in graphite mines. In 1901, he became involved in the hotel business in Hague, becoming the owner and manager of the Trout House on Lake George. He was also a director of the Bolton National Bank, president of the Hague Chamber of Commerce and the Lake George Resort Association, and a member of the American Hotelmen's Association, the New York State Hotelmen's Association, and the Lake George Association.

Bolton served as town supervisor from 1908 to 1912 and 1917 to 1924, serving as chairman of the board from 1922 to 1924. He served as sheriff from 1913 to 1915 and from 1919 to 1921. In 1924, he was elected to the New York State Assembly as a Republican, representing Warren County. He served in the Assembly in 1925 and 1926. He continued serving as supervisor in the Assembly, serving until 1931 and then from 1936 until his death. He was also a member of the Warren County Republican Committee for many years.

Bolton was a member of the Warren County farm bureau, the Elks, the Freemasons, the Royal Arch Masonry, the Knights Templar, the Scottish Rite, the Shriners, the York Rite, the Fraternal Order of Eagles, and the Hague Grange. He attended the Episcopal Church. In 1898, he married Mame Brown. Their children were Earl Richard and Pauline E.

Bolton died at the Moses-Ludington Hospital in Ticonderoga from a pulmonary embolism on May 8, 1954. He was buried in Valley View Cemetery.

New York State Assembly
Preceded by Milton N. Eldridge	New York State Assembly; Warren County; 1925–1926	Succeeded by Powel J. Smith
