= Ginger Colton =

Australia international rugby union player (1875–1946)

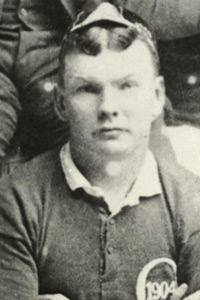
- Born: Alfred John Colton; 25 March 1875 Brisbane, Queensland
- Died: 2 June 1946 (aged 71)
- Notable relative: Tom Colton

Rugby union career
- Position: number 8
International career
Years	Team	Apps	(Points)
1899	Australia	2	(3)

Alfred John "Ginger" Colton (25 March 1875 – 2 June 1946) was a rugby union player who represented Australia.

Colton, a number 8, was born in Brisbane Queensland and claimed two international rugby caps for Australia. His debut game was against Great Britain at Sydney on 24 June 1899, the inaugural rugby Test match played by an Australian national representative side. His younger brother Tom Colton also represented for Australia in 1904.

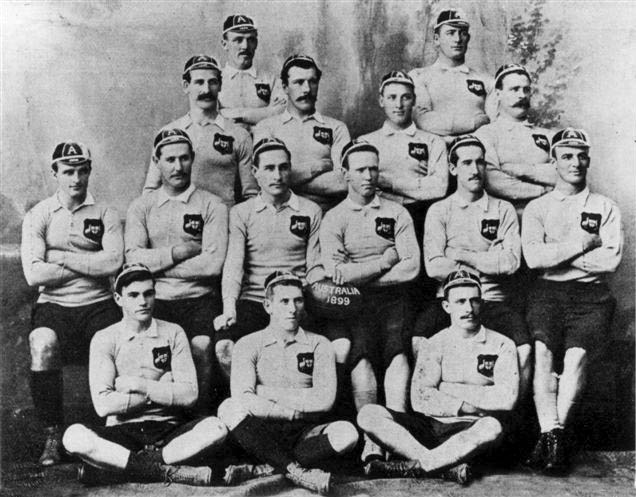
Colton (2nd row, 3rd from right) in the Australian rugby union team 1899

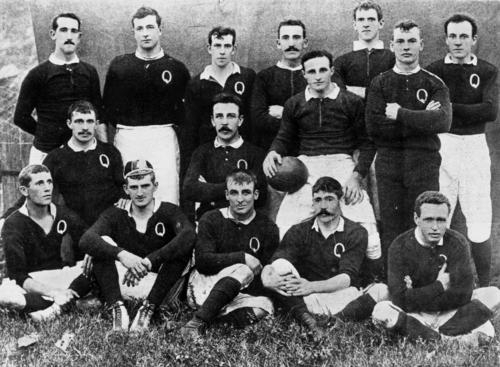
Colton appears front row far right, after 1 July Queensland match against the 1899 British Lions.

== Published references ==
- Collection (1995) Gordon Bray presents The Spirit of Rugby, Harper Collins Publishers Sydney
- Howell, Max (2005) Born to Lead - Wallaby Test Captains, Celebrity Books, Auckland NZ
