= John Bolton (weightlifter) =

New Zealand weightlifter (born 1945)

Personal information
- Born: 22 June 1945 (age 81) Auckland, New Zealand
- Height: 1.75 m (5 ft 9 in)
- Weight: 90 kg (200 lb)

Sport
- Country: New Zealand
- Sport: Weightlifting
Medal record
British Commonwealth Games
Silver medal – second place	1970 Edinburgh	Light heavyweight
Silver medal – second place	1974 Christchurch	Heavyweight

John Arthur Bolton (born 22 June 1945) is a former New Zealand weightlifter. He won two silver medals representing New Zealand at British Commonwealth Games.

He won the silver medal at the 1970 British Commonwealth Games in the men's under 82.5 kg. Four years later at the 1974 British Commonwealth Games he won the silver medal in the men's 110 kg grade.

He represented New Zealand at two Olympic Games, at the 1968 Mexico Olympics and at the 1972 Munich Olympics. His best result was 16th place in the light-heavyweight grade at the 1968 Olympics.

He currently works as a real estate agent in Manukau, Auckland.
