= James C. Bolton =

James Calderwood Bolton
- Born: April 18, 1899; Alexandria, Louisiana, US
- Died: September 10, 1974 (aged 75); Alexandria, Louisiana, US
- Resting place: Greenwood Memorial Park in Pineville, Louisiana
- Education: Culver Military Academy; Wharton School of University of Pennsylvania
- Occupation: Banker
- Political party: Democratic
- Spouse: Frances Sample Bolton (m. 1924)
- Children: 2
- Parent: James W. Bolton

Notes
- The James C. Bolton Library at Louisiana State University in Alexandria is named in his honor.

James Calderwood Bolton (April 18, 1899 – September 10, 1974), like his father and younger brother was a banker in his native Alexandria, Louisiana, educated in public schools and the college preparatory Culver Military Academy in Culver, Indiana. He served in the United States Army during World War I.

== Biography ==
In 1920, Bolton received the Bachelor of Science degree from the Wharton School of the University of Pennsylvania in Philadelphia, Pennsylvania. From 1921 to 1922, he was a member of the credit department of the National Bank of Commerce in New York City. Bolton joined his father's Rapides Bank in Alexandria. He was assistant cashier from 1922 to 1925, vice president from 1925 to 1936, president from 1936 to 1955, and the chairman of the Rapides Bank board from 1956 until his death.

Bolton was the director of the Delta Cotton Oil and Fertilizer Company in Jackson, Mississippi, and the Louisiana Board of Public Welfare in Baton Rouge during the administrations of Governors Robert F. Kennon (1952–1956) and Jimmie Davis (1960–1964). From 1944 to 1970, he was the chairman of the Alexandria Civil Service Commission. He was the president from 1964 to 1965 of the LSU Foundation and was instrumental in the founding of Louisiana State University at Alexandria, originally a two-year institution. The LSU-A library is named in his honor. Bolton was active in Alexandria Chamber of Commerce, as president, 1930–1931; chairman of the industrial development division, 1965–1974. From 1933–1934, he was the president of the Louisiana Bankers Association. He was also president in 1935 of the state banking division of the American Bankers Association. Like his parents, he was a member of the Emmanuel Baptist Church. From 1928 to 1953, he served on the executive board of the Louisiana Baptist Convention. He was president of the Louisiana Baptist Foundation from 1948 to 1959. He was affiliated with Kiwanis International.

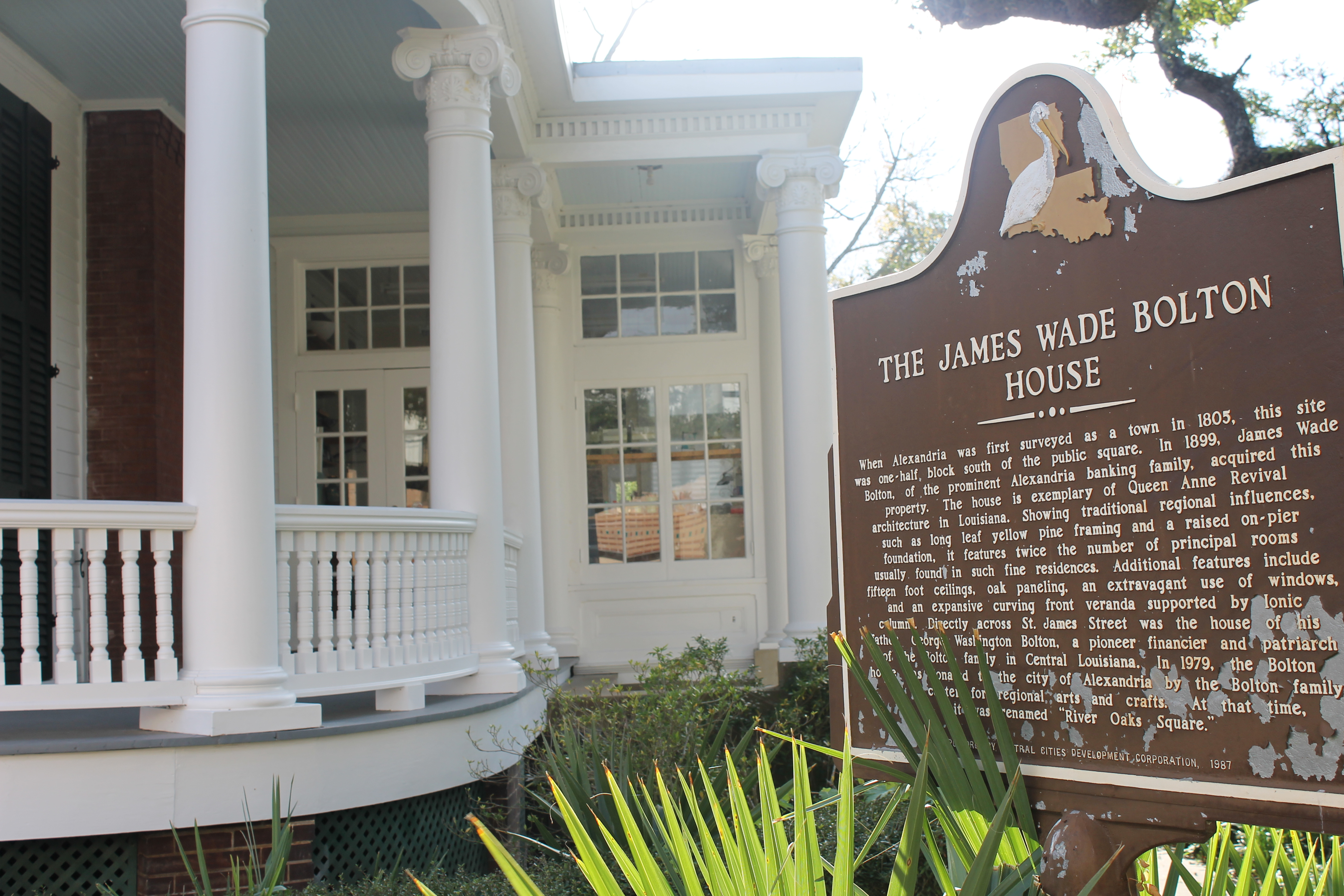
River Oaks, the restored James Wade Bolton House, is located at 1330 Main Street in downtown Alexandria, Louisiana.

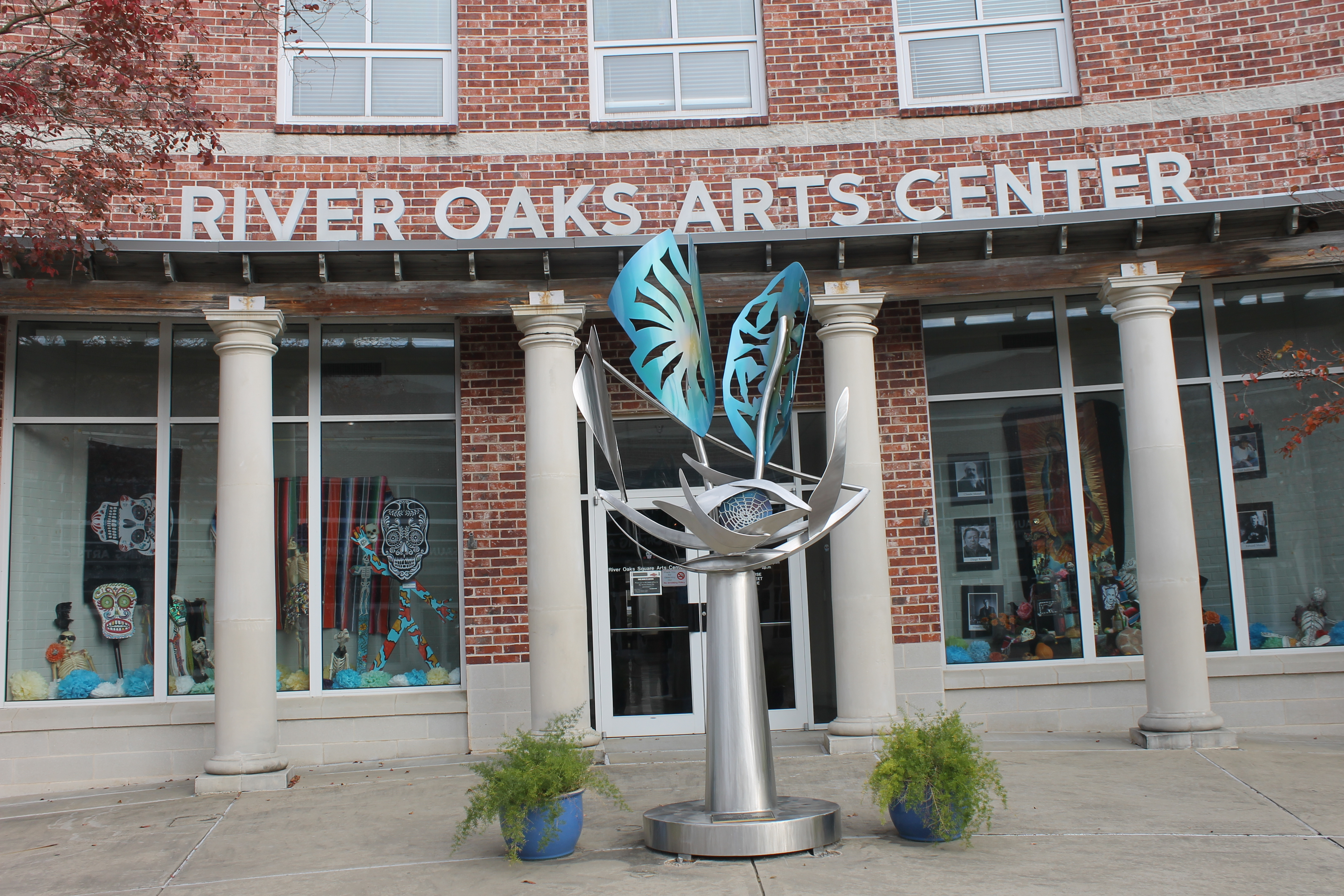
The Bolton House has been converted into the River Oaks Art Center in Alexandria.

In 1924, Bolton wed the former Frances Sample, the daughter of Samuel Guy and Sarah Emma McCrory Sample of Shreveport. The couple had two daughters, Mary Eleanor (born 1927) and Frances (born 1928).

== Legacy ==
In 1979, the surviving Bolton family members donated their grandparents' former downtown residence to the City of Alexandria. Built in Queen Anne style architecture, the house dates to the late 1890s. The property was converted into the River Oaks Square Arts Center and is listed on the National Register of Historic Places.
