= John Bolton (Manx politician) =

Manx politician

Sir John Brown Bolton OBE (born 1902 - died 11 September 1980) was an English accountant and Manx politician. He served in the Manx parliament for 33 years from 1946 to 1979 and was chairman of the Government Finance Board for over a decade.

== Early life and education ==
Bolton was born in 1902 in Norfolk, the son of the Rev. Richard and Elizabeth Bolton. He was educated at Hull Grammar School and Keighley Trade and Grammar School in West Yorkshire and later trained as a chartered accountant.

== Career ==
Bolton played a prominent role in the politics of Tynwald, serving both as a member of the Legislative Council and the House of Keys.

From 1967 to 1976, he was also the Island's Chairman of the Finance Board, effectively acting as the Chancellor of the Exchequer on the island. He qualified as a chartered accountant and ran a large accounting firm, and applied his accounting skills in his capacity on the Finance Board. Under his stewardship, the Isle of Man underwent significant economic development in the 1970s.

In total, he served in some role on the Executive Council of the Isle of Man for a record tenure of 23 years, thereby marking him as one of the most crucial Manx political figures of recent memory.

Bolton retired as chairman of the Government Finance Board in 1976 and retired from parliament in 1979. In 1978, he became the chair of the Manx subsidiary of S. G. Warburg & Co.

== Personal life and death ==
In 1930, Bolton married Mary Smith and the couple had two children. He died on 11 September 1980, aged 79.

== Awards and honours ==
Bolton was appointed a member of the Order of the British Empire in the Queen's New Years Honours of 1973. In 1977, he was also knighted for his contributions to public service.

== Governmental positions ==
- Chairman of the Finance Board, 1967-1976
- Member of the Executive Council, 1954-1977
