= John Bolton (priest) =

Dean of Derry from 1700 to 1724

John Bolton (1655–1724) was a Dean of the Church of Ireland.

Bolton educated at Trinity College, Dublin. He received the degree of Doctor of Divinity (DD). He was Dean of Derry from 1700 until his death.
