= William Robert Fossey Bolton =

Bill Bolton
- Born: 24 May 1905; Taringa, Queensland, Australia
- Died: 3 August 1973 (aged 68); Toowoomba, Queensland, Australia
- Occupations: Businessman, art collector, benefactor
- Organization(s): Cobb & Co Transport, Toowoomba
- Spouse: Marion Isabel Salisbury (m. 1935)
- Children: Three sons, two daughters

William Robert Fossey Bolton MBE (24 May 1905 – 1973) was a transport businessman and philanthropist, who lived in the Toowoomba area of South East Queensland, Australia. His efforts saw the creation of a library and art gallery focused on Australian heritage of European settlement, and his interest in preserving the memory of horse-drawn transport contributed to a museum collection.

== Personal life ==
Born to Henry Fossey Bolton and Flora Grace Mackay, Bolton was one of five children – Agnes (b. 1904), Heather (b. 1907), Henry (b. 1908), and Grant (b. 1913). A young Bill Bolton was raised in Brisbane, before some primary school education at the town of Charleville in western Queensland. In sheep-farming country, the area was serviced by the horse-drawn Cobb & Co transport company, which was to make an impression on Bolton. In April 1918 the family, now living in the large provincial town of Toowoomba, started to experience financial hardship when the twelve-year-old Bill found the body of his father who had committed suicide. A scholarship allowed Bolton to attend the Toowoomba Grammar School, and in 1920, he became a junior clerk with the Queensland Government's Lands Department in Brisbane.

In 1935, Bolton married Marion Isabel Salisbury at the Sandgate Presbyterian Church and moved back to Toowoomba.

Additional to his philanthropic endeavours as a benefactor, Bolton celebrated his Mackay clan heritage and was an inaugural member of the Society of Saint Andrew of Scotland (Queensland branch).

The strain of the legal proceedings in his business life affected his health, and Bolton died in 1973. His Australian heritage collections were donated to various public institutions.

== Business interests ==
Studying accountancy, he established this business when returning to Toowoomba in 1935. In 1943 in partnership with Percy Morgan Redman, Redmans Transport was formed at the same time as the military in World War II required the large-scale movement of supplies. Contracts with Paul's Dairy Company also ensured success. The business was renamed Cobb & Co. Redman Transport in 1948. This resulted in legal action being initiated by George Studdert, the last company secretary of Cobb & Co stage coaches and transport, with a settlement made by Bolton in 1954. The heavy road haulage firm traded on the name association with the former Cobb & Co.

In 1957 a dispute with the Queensland Government commenced over newly introduced transport licensing fees. The dispute ran until 1966 when the Privy Council ruled against Bolton.

Bolton's keen interest in cricket saw the business in 1963 bring fast bowler Ray Lindwall to Queensland as an employee so he could play cricket for the State.

In 1966 Bolton was awarded a Order of the British Empire (MBE) in recognition of his charitable endeavours in the Toowoomba region. Whilst the nomination was endorsed by the Queensland premier Frank Nicklin, the same government had earlier sought to question Bolton's integrity.

Bolton continued owning the Cobb & Co transport bus and trucking company in Toowoomba until his death in 1973.

== Legacy ==
Not forgetting the charity provided to his family when his father died, Bolton provided many bursaries to youth in country areas, and funded several other community-minded facilities and services. He was made a life member of the Royal Flying Doctor Service (RFDS) for his visible and financial support. In 1962 to fund-raise for the RFDS, 25 horses trained by Bolton's son undertook to draw a Cobb & Co coach from Cairns to Melbourne.

Throughout his life, Bolton collected twenty-eight horse and carriage vehicles for his own private museum which was opened to the public in Toowoomba in 1965. Today that collection forms part of the Cobb & Co Museum in Toowoomba. Over the years archival material was assembled, including interviews with past Cobb & Co. employees. His interest in the Australian pioneer lifestyle led Bolton to form a friendship with Australia's bush balladist of the Outback, William Ogilvie (1869–1963).

With the intention of giving 'regional Queenslanders access to the European history of Australia', the Lionel Lindsay Gallery and Library, Toowoomba Regional Art Gallery was established through the funding by Bolton, being opened on 4 April 1959 by the Australian prime minister Robert Menzies. The Bolton Reading Room is named in Bill's memory. There are over 500 artworks and 3,000 books, manuscripts and maps in the library. Part of the 'Bolton Collection' of Australian history and art formed the book Celebrating Bill Bolton's vision of Australia : Toowoomba Regional Art Gallery 22 September - 25 November 2001.
