= John Bolton (cricketer) =

Australian cricketer

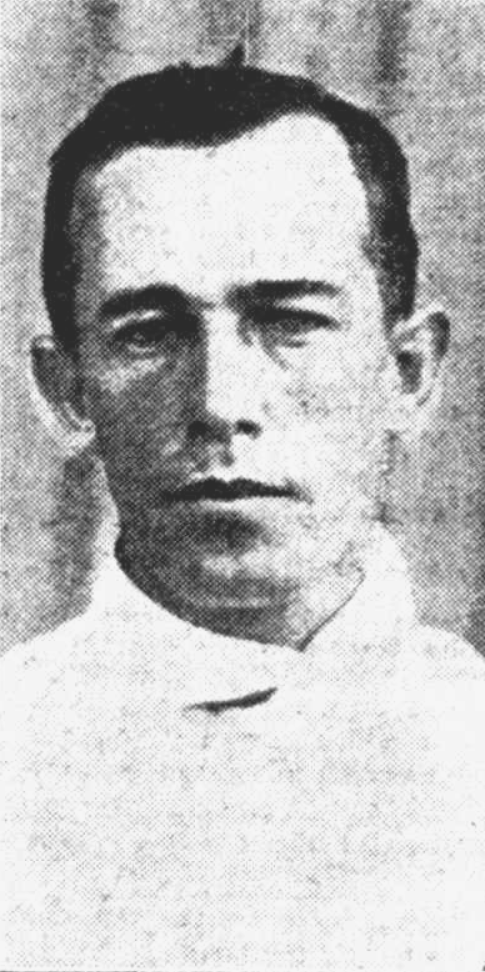

Personal information
- Born: 3 October 1881; Riverstone, New South Wales, Australia
- Died: 23 September 1935 (aged 53); Brisbane, Queensland, Australia
- Source: Cricinfo, 1 October 2020

John Bolton (3 October 1881 – 23 September 1935) was an Australian cricketer. He played in five first-class matches for Queensland between 1911 and 1915.

== See also ==
- List of Queensland first-class cricketers
