= Charles Anselm Bolton =

Charles Anselm Bolton (born c. 1905, obituary published 2 December 1970) was for many years a priest of the Roman Catholic Church, being the Priest of Salford Diocese in 1950, as well as author of numerous books and articles, mostly relating to the history of the Roman Catholic Church.

He was born at Longridge, a small town and civil parish in the borough of Ribble Valley in Lancashire, England. His education was continental, beginning with a Bachelor's Degree from Belgium's Louvain, and with theological diplomas from the Institut Catholique de Paris and from Rome's Collegio S. Anselmo. He was ordained as a priest in 1930.

He was a professor of history and of the English, French, Russian and German languages at St Bede's College, Manchester, where he taught for over 20 years. He left after the first year to attend Oxford University, obtaining a master's degree in history and a diploma in education in 1932, and returning to St Bede's.

In 1950, he wrote a history of the diocese of Salford. He was then appointed to the parish at Clayton-le-Moors, a small industrial town two miles north of Accrington in the borough of Hyndburn, his first appointment as a parish priest. He was later made parish priest of the Heaton Norris parish in the Metropolitan Borough of Stockport, Greater Manchester. He then moved to St. Louis, Missouri to teach at a Benedictine school. Finally, he went to Belmont Abbey, Herefordshire, from which he retired from the priesthood.

He later followed Friedrich Heiler and others in preaching Reformation doctrines, and became a professor of modern languages at Houghton College, New York. By 1963, Bolton was described in a Delaware County Daily Times article as a "former Catholic priest." A 1963 advertisement in the Mansfield, Ohio News-Journal promoted a series of sermons by Bolton, described as "a Modern Martin Luther" who had been ordained to Roman Catholic priesthood in 1930 and converted to evangelical faith in 1962, and the next year an advertisement in The Boston Globe promoted a sermon by Bolton as "the amazing story of a religious leader whose life was changed by reading the Jansenist Reformers."

He died in Pontypridd, Glamorgan at the age of 66.

== Writings ==
- A Catholic memorial of Lord Halifax and Cardinal Mercier. 1935.
- Salford Diocese and its Catholic past: a survey. 1950.
- "Beyond the Ecumenical: Pan-deism?" in Christianity Today, 1963, page 21.
- Church reform in 18th century Italy: (The synod of Pistoia, 1786). 1969.
