= John Bolton (Haverfordwest MP) =

English politician

John Bolton or Button (by 1524 – 1556 or later) was an English politician. He was a member (MP) of the parliament of England for Haverfordwest in 1555.
