= John M. Bolton =

American businessman and politician

Member of the Illinois House of Representatives for the Second District
- In office 1931 – July 9, 1936

Personal details
- Born: October 5, 1901 Chicago, Illinois, U.S.
- Died: July 9, 1936 (aged 34) Chicago, Illinois, U.S.
- Cause of death: Shooting
- Resting place: All Saints Cemetery
- Party: Democratic
- Education: Chicago Public Schools

John M. Bolton (October 5, 1901 – July 9, 1936) was an American businessman who served as a Democratic member of the Illinois House of Representatives. He was assassinated in Chicago at the age of 34 by a person or persons who remain unknown.

== Biography ==
Bolton was born in Chicago and attended Chicago public schools. He was in the floral business and insurance business. A Democrat, he was first elected to the Illinois House of Representatives, representing the Second District, in the fall of 1930, taking office in early 1931. He was re-elected in 1932, and in 1934 (unopposed).

Bolton was shot to death following a car chase in Chicago shortly after midnight on July 9, 1936. The Associated Press reported that he may have been assassinated by organized crime figures due to his efforts to legalize some forms of betting, and the Chicago Tribune attributed his death to "gangsters" in a page-one story. The Tribune also published photos of Bolton's car, which had crashed at Washtenaw Avenue and Harrison Street, and noted that Bolton had a brother who had been a prohibition gangster. A follow-up story by the United Press reported that Bolton may have been killed because he was unsuccessful in helping some prisoners in the Joliet Penitentiary get parole. Bolton was buried at All Saints Cemetery in Des Plaines. His assailants were not caught and remain unknown.

Chicago Outfit racketeer Fred Smith later informed the FBI that Sam Giancana personally killed Bolton.

Bolton was married and had two foster children at the time of his death.
