= Charles Bolton (footballer) =

Australian rules footballer

Personal information
- Full name: Charles Theophilus Bolton
- Born: 1 July 1876; Serpentine, Victoria
- Died: 15 September 1954 (aged 78); Brighton, Victoria
- Original team: Euroa

Playing career^{1}
Years	Club	Games (Goals)
1907	Essendon	1 (0)
- ^{1} Playing statistics correct to the end of 1907.

Charles Theophilus Bolton (1 July 1876 – 15 September 1954) was an Australian rules footballer who played a single game with Essendon in the Victorian Football League (VFL).

== Military service ==
Eight years after his brief senior football career, Bolton served in World War I. He enlisted in the Royal Australian Navy on 12 August 1914, giving his occupation as a carpenter and lying about his age. He spent six months in New Guinea before enlisting in the Army with the 7th Light Horse in June 1915. He fought at Gallipoli before being discharged with heart problems in August 1916.
