= William Bolton (footballer) =

English footballer

Personal information
- Full name: William Bolton
- Place of birth: England
- Position: Winger

Senior career*
Years	Team	Apps	(Gls)
1915–1916	Burnley	1	(0)
- * Club domestic league appearances and goals

William Bolton was an English footballer who played as a winger. He played one match in the Football League for Burnley. He made his debut for Burnley in the 2–1 win over Newcastle United on 14 April 1915.
