= Joseph Shaw Bolton =

British physician

- Born: 1867; Whitby
- Died: 12 November 1946; Beaconsfield
- Occupations: physician and professor of mental diseases
- Notable work: The Brain in Health and Disease (1914)

Joseph Shaw Bolton FRCP (1867–1946) was a British physician, pathologist, psychiatrist and neurologist who was Professor of Mental Diseases at the University of Leeds.

== Early life and education ==
After education at Spring Hill School in Whitby, Bolton worked as an assistant without formal qualification at an asylum and as an assistant to a general practitioner in Manchester. He graduated BSc (London) in 1888. He then studied at University College London Medical School where he graduated MB ChB in 1894 and became a demonstrator of anatomy. By 1896 he graduated MD.

Charles Bolton, FRS was Bolton's younger brother.

== Career ==
From 1896 to 1899, Bolton was lecturer in physiology at Mason Science College, Birmingham (now the University of Birmingham). He was pathologist at Claybury Lunatic Asylum from 1899 to 1903. He was a senior assistant at Hellingly's East Sussex County Asylum from 1903 to 1905 and then at the County Mental Hospital, Rainhill from 1905 to 1910.

From 1910 to 1933 Bolton was director of the West Riding Mental Hospital, Wakefield. He was appointed Professor of Mental Diseases at the University of Leeds in 1911, holding the chair until his retirement as Emeritus Professor.

He was a determined opponent of the new psychiatry and expressed his views on the Freudian school in an article entitled Myth of the Unconscious Mind (1926). ... He emerged from his retirement to act as medical superintendent of Buckingham Mental Hospital and remained its consulting physician.

== Marriage and children ==
Bolton married Ellen Rogers in Whitby in 1906. They had two sons and one daughter.

== Awards and honours ==
- 1909 — FRCP
- 1910 — Goulstonian Lecturer
- 1925 — Maudsley Lecturer
- 1928 — President of the Royal Medico-Psychological Association
- 1933 — Henderson Trust Lecturer
- 1935 — Lumleian Lecturer
