= William Bolton (Royal Navy officer, died 1817) =

Captain William Bolton (died 1817) was a captain in the Royal Navy who served during the French Revolutionary Wars.

== Biography ==
His first known service was when he passed the Lieutenant's exam in 1789, becoming a Lieutenant in October of the following year. He commanded the Aurore from December 1795 to September 1796 and Wolverine from February 1799, before his promotion to captain and commander of Arrow in early 1800. He took command of Aimable in September 1803, and Fisgard from August 1805 to mid-1809, serving in Jamaica and the North Sea and taking part in the Walcheren Campaign in 1809.

He was appointed a Companion of the Order of the Bath on 16 September 1815. (Note: It is assumed that this does not refer to the other Captain Sir William Bolton, as he had been knighted some years earlier. This honour does seem to have been conferred somewhat belatedly, as there is no record of Bolton's command of any ships beyond 1809; however, as the class of CB only came into being in 1815, it is conceivable that a large group of captains were thus belatedly honoured for their service.)
