= William Compton Bolton =

William Compton Bolton (died 22 February 1849), born William Bolton Finch in England, was an officer in the United States Navy during the mid-19th century.

As William Bolton Finch, he was a midshipman from 20 June 1806, lieutenant from 4 January 1813 and captain from 21 Feb 1831. He served with distinction in the War of 1812, serving on the Essex from 1812 to 1814, and in 1829-30 commanded Vincennes in her first around-the-world voyage by a US Navy vessel.

He changed his name to William Compton Bolton on 14 January 1833; his sister Elizabeth changed her surname from Finch to Bolton at the same time.

Bolton commanded the Pensacola Navy Yard from 1836 to 1837.

From 2 August 1839 to 1841 he commanded the Brandywine. In 1848, he was the commander of the Mediterranean Squadron and later the Africa Squadron in the sloop-of-war USS Jamestown in manoeuvres off the Cape Verde islands, Madeira and the Mediterranean.

He died on 22 February 1849 at Genoa.

His widow, Mary H. Lynch Bolton, married Charles Wilkes on October 3, 1854. Commodore Bolton had sat on Wilkes' court-martial board in 1842.
