= Joe Bolton (footballer) =

English footballer

Personal information
- Full name: Joseph Bolton
- Date of birth: 2 February 1955 (age 71)
- Place of birth: Birtley, England
- Height: 5 ft 11 1/2 in (1.82 m)
- Position: Full back

Youth career
- Sunderland

Senior career*
| Years | Team | Apps | (Gls) |
| 1972–1981 | Sunderland | 273 | (11) |
| 1981–1983 | Middlesbrough | 59 | (1) |
| 1983–1986 | Sheffield United | 109 | (3) |
| 1986–1988 | Matlock Town | | |
- * Club domestic league appearances and goals

Joseph Bolton (born 2 February 1955) is an English former footballer who played primarily as a left back. Born in Birtley in Tyne and Wear he started his career at nearby Sunderland as a trainee and spent nine years at the club before moving to Middlesbrough and then Sheffield United, following which he was forced to retire through injury.

== Playing career ==
=== Sunderland ===
Having joined the club as a trainee Bolton made his debut for Sunderland on 17 April 1972 against Watford in a 5–0 win at Roker Park. He soon established himself in the first team and remained a stalwart of the side for the next nine seasons. A cult hero with the fans at Roker Park he was a key member of the side that clinched the Division Two title in 1976. When he finally left Sunderland he had made 273 league appearances and scored 11 goals.

=== Middlesbrough ===
In 1981 Bolton was signed by Sunderland's North East rivals Middlesbrough for £200,000. In two seasons, he made 59 appearances, scoring a solitary goal.

=== Sheffield United ===
Bolton signed for Sheffield United on a free transfer in August 1983, brought to the club by his former Sunderland teammate Ian Porterfield who was now manager at Bramall Lane. Viewed as a solid, no-nonsense defender during his time at the club, he helped United to promotion as they finished third in Division Three in his first season. After making 130 appearances for the club in three years injuries began to take their toll and he was released in May 1986.

== Post professional career ==
After an unsuccessful trial with Rotherham United Bolton dropped into non-league and spent a season and a half playing for Matlock Town before finally retiring and taking a job as a lorry driver.

== In popular culture ==
Bolton was mentioned on the back of The Housemartins' single, 'Happy Hour', which described the band as having "more striking power than Lineker, Platini and Joe Bolton all rolled together into a great big cuddly ball."

== Honours ==
Sunderland

- Division Two: Champions 1976

Sheffield United

- Division Three: Third (promoted) 1984
