= William Bolton (rugby union) =

Scotland international rugby union player

- Born: William Henry Bolton; 15 March 1851 Stirling, Scotland
- Died: 5 December 1896 (aged 45) Kensington, London, England

Rugby union career
- Position: Forward
Amateur team(s)
Years	Team	Apps	(Points)
-	West of Scotland		
International career
Years	Team	Apps	(Points)
1876	Scotland	1	(0)

William Bolton (1851-1896) was a Scotland international rugby football player.

== Rugby Union career ==
=== Amateur career ===
Bolton played for West of Scotland.

=== International career ===
He was capped once for Scotland on 6 March 1876.
