= William Bolton (Lord Mayor) =

English merchant and Lord Mayor of London

Lord Mayor of London
- In office 1666–1667
- Preceded by: Thomas Bloodworth
- Succeeded by: William Peake

Personal details
- Died: 1680
- Spouse: Elizabeth Hampton

Sir William Bolton (died 1680) was an English merchant who was Lord Mayor of London in 1666.

== Biography ==
Bolton was a city of London merchant and a member of the Worshipful Company of Merchant Taylors. In 1659 he was elected an alderman of the City of London for Castle Baynard ward and became Master of the Merchant Taylors Company. Also in 1659, he was colonel of the Blue Regiment. He was one of the Sheriffs of London from 1660 to 1661 and was knighted on 11 October 1663. In 1666, he was elected 331st Lord Mayor of London. However he was unable to account for £1,800 of the collections made for those who suffered in the Great Fire of London and was accused of cheating the poor of the City. As a result, he was barred from attending the Court of Aldermen while an inquiry took place and eventually had to resign his seat. He became very poor and on 19 March 1677 the Court of Common Council voted him a pension of £3 per week.

Civic offices
Preceded by Thomas Bloodworth	Lord Mayor of London; 1666-1667	Succeeded by William Peake
