= Charles Bolton (pathologist) =

British physician and pathologist

Charles Bolton CBE FRS FRCP (24 September 1870 – 6 December 1947) was a British physician and pathologist.

Bolton was born in Whitby, Yorkshire, the younger brother of psychiatrist Joseph Shaw Bolton (1867–1946). He trained as a doctor at University College Hospital in London and worked there in later life, holding the positions of resident medical officer, consulting physician, director of pathological studies and research, and lecturer in clinical medicine and general pathology at the medical school. He was also physician to the Queen's Hospital for Children. He held the degrees of Doctor of Medicine (MD) and Doctor of Science (DSc) and was elected Fellow of the Royal Society in 1918.

Bolton was appointed Commander of the Order of the British Empire (CBE) in January 1920 for services in the First World War. In 1928 he gave the Croonian Lecture of the Royal College of Physicians.
