= William Bolton (Royal Navy officer, died 1830) =

English naval captain (1777–1830)

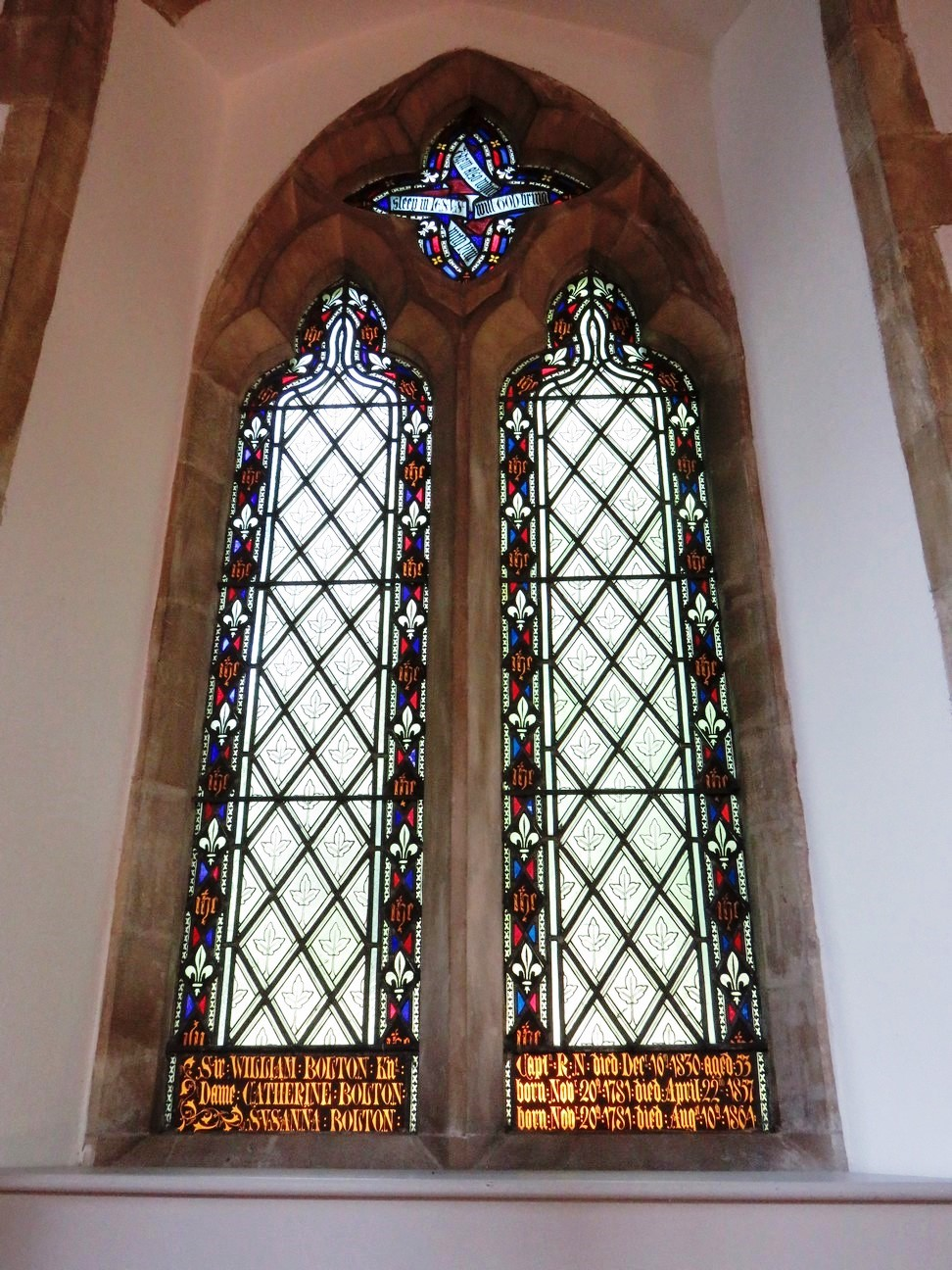
Memorial window at St Mary Burnham Westgate.

Captain Sir William Bolton (1777 – 16 December 1830) was a post-captain in the Royal Navy who served under Nelson during the French Revolutionary Wars and was married to Dame Catherine Bolton, Nelson's niece. He also served in the Napoleonic Wars and the War of 1812.

== Early life and family ==
Bolton was born at Ipswich, Suffolk, sometime in 1777 before 16 December, (Note: DOB based on age at date of death.) baptised 26 December, at St Matthew's Church, the son of Mary Woodthorpe and Rev. William Bolton, Rector of Brancaster and Hollesley, whose brother Thomas was married to Nelson's sister Susannah. His father passed on his taste for the classics and literature, and the family spent 1786–1787 in France, where Sir William became fluent in French.

On 18 May 1803, he married his first cousin Catherine Bolton (also known as Kitty), one of twin eldest daughters of Susannah Nelson and Thomas Bolton, at the home of Emma Hamilton at 23 Piccadilly. His father performed the ceremony; Nelson's sister Charlotte (later Duchess of Bronté) and Emma's daughter Emma Carew were witnesses. Catherine was sister of Thomas Bolton of Brickworth and Landford, in Wiltshire, later 2nd Earl Nelson.

== Naval service and honours ==
Bolton began his naval career during the French Revolutionary Wars in early 1793 as midshipman aboard Agamemnon at Chatham, soon after Nelson had assumed command, and continued to serve on this ship until August 1795, (Note: Contrary to some sources, Bolton does not appear to have served on Blanche; contemporary sources show that he was on Agamemnon at this time, so it might have been the other Captain William Bolton (see William Bolton), or even a third William Bolton (one source reports that a midshipman William Bolton was killed in Blanche vs Pique battle).) when Nelson placed him with Captain Ralph Willett Miller on Captain. He continued to serve under Nelson in most of the most memorable missions of this period, including on Theseus and Ville de Paris.

On 20 June 1797, after having been recommended by Nelson to Earl St Vincent, he was appointed acting Lieutenant of Colossus under Captain George Murray, an appointment confirmed on 11 August. He continued to serve with the fleet in the Mediterranean until October 1798, when he rejoined Nelson in Vanguard at Naples, then followed him into Foudroyant, until August 1800. After a short interval on Malta (previously the French brig Guillaume Tell), Bolton served with Nelson successively on San Josef and St George, both under Captain Thomas Hardy.

After the Battle of Copenhagen, on 2 April 1801, he was promoted to Commander and appointed as Commanding Officer of Dart, where he remained until it was paid off in October 1802.

On 24 March 1803, Nelson recommended Bolton to the First Lord of the Admiralty, Lord St Vincent, to be sent to the Mediterranean, and in a letter to his sister Susannah a few days later expressed his interest in the welfare of this "excellent young man"; he repeated his request on July 4. On the day after Bolton's wedding, 19 May 1803, he was knighted and stood proxy for Nelson on the occasion of his being invested with the insignia of his last additional orders (as Nelson had already set off for Toulon). In July–August 1803 he was appointed to Childers and followed Nelson into the Mediterranean, where he served until 5 April 1805.

He was posted as Captain (known as Post-captain in those days to distinguish from other officers in command of a ship) on 10 April 1805, whereupon he successively commanded Amfitrite (later Basque) until May 1805, and then the Guerriere. He had been nominated by Nelson to join him at the Battle of Trafalgar aboard the Melpomene, but this was cancelled after Nelson's death at that battle.

He then successively commanded Eurydice (Jan 1806 – Jan 1808, mostly in the Channel), Druid (1808–1810) on the Irish station and then Endymion (1810–1812) In these ships he served in the West Indies, Bay of Biscay, Ireland, around Madeira and the Azores. On 19 March 1809 Druid captured the schooner Belle Hortense; on 25 June the French private ship of war Jenny and her cargo; on 13 November 1809 Basque, French national brig (later Foxhound). On Endymion in November 1810, he captured the French privateer Milan of St. Malo, with 14 guns and 80 men.

After Endymion had been paid off at Plymouth in May 1812, Bolton retired to Burnham, Norfolk, and enjoyed a year's domestic respite.

In June 1813 he was appointed to Forth, which served first in the Baltic and then North America in the War of 1812. On 19 September 1814 he captured American privateer brig Regent in Little Egg Harbor.

Soon after the Battle of Waterloo in June 1815, he was selected to convey the Duchess of Angoulême, Marie Thérèse of France to France, whose party included Mathieu de Montmorency, later French representative at the Congress of Verona in 1822.

== Life after the navy ==
Sir William and Dame Catherine had 5 children, of whom only 3 daughters survived to adulthood.

After retirement, Sir William resumed his passion for the classics, completely mastering Greek and finding amusement and pleasure in reading Greek and Roman writers, historians, satirists and poets. He also learnt German, Spanish and Italian.

He died at the age of 53 on 16 Dec 1830 at Costessey. Some time later, after the death of Catherine and later her twin sister Jemima (a.k.a. Susanna), a memorial window was created in the church of St Mary's at Burnham Westgate, honouring them all.
