= Henry Dwight Holton =

American physician (1838–1917)

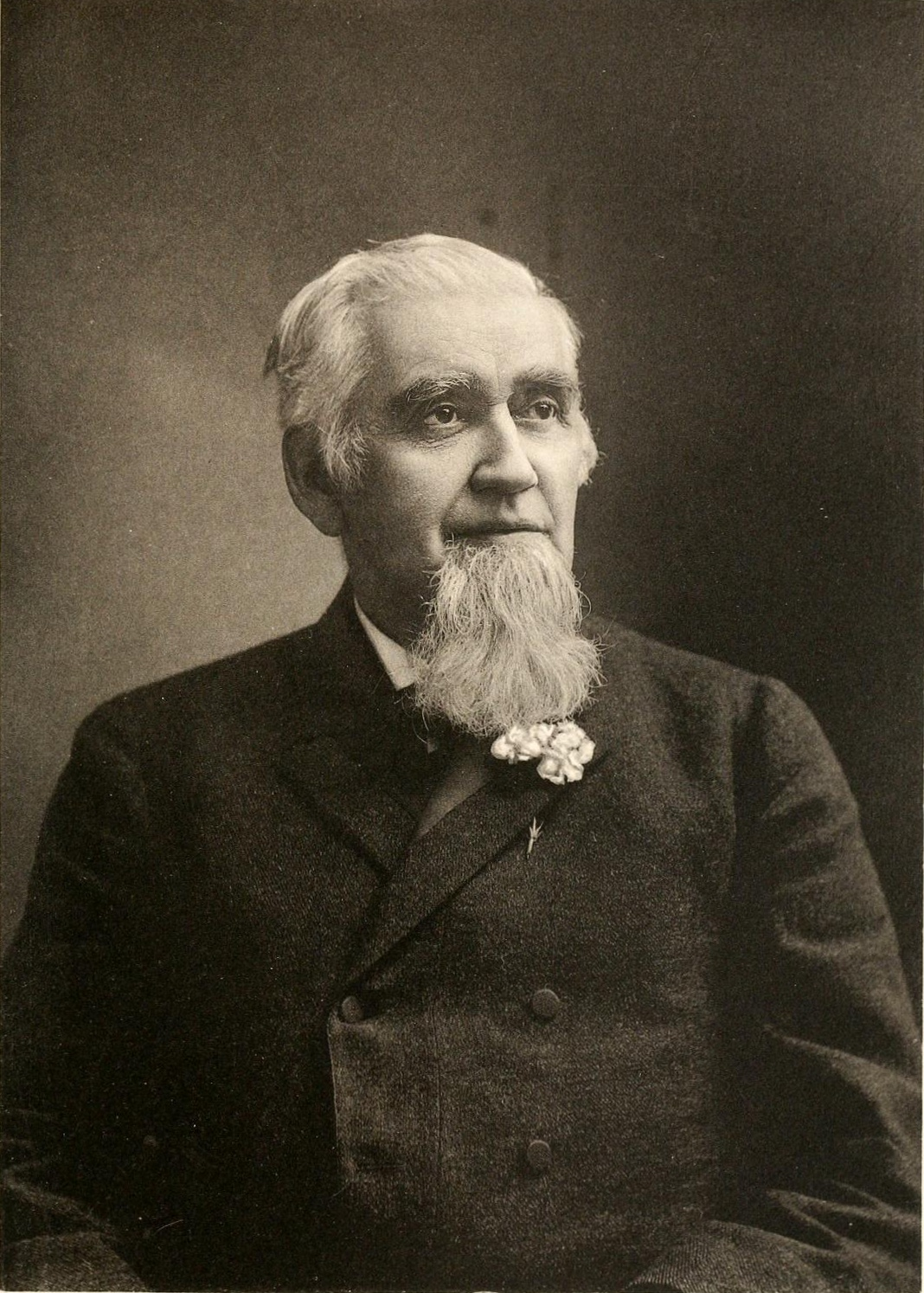
- Born: July 24, 1838; Saxtons River, Vermont
- Died: February 17, 1917 (aged 78); Brattleboro, Vermont
- Education: New York University
- Years active: 1860–1917
- Medical career
- Profession: Physician
- Field: General practitioner
- Institutions: University of Vermont

Signature
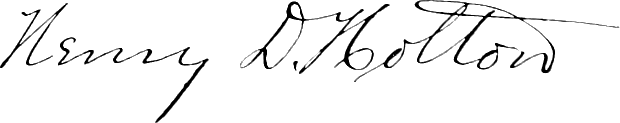

Henry Dwight Holton (1838–1917) was an American physician from Vermont, known for his efforts to improve public health through better sanitation and disease monitoring. He was professor of therapeutics and general pathology in the medical department of the University of Vermont from 1873 to 1886, treasurer for nine years of the American Public Health Association and president of that body in 1901–2, president of the Vermont Medical Society and vice president of the American Medical Association, one of the founders and president of the board of trustees of the Pan-American Medical Congress, and secretary of the Vermont Board of Health. He was elected to the Vermont Senate in 1884 and General Assembly in 1888.

Holton was born July 24, 1838, in the village of Saxtons River in the town of Rockingham, Vermont, to parents Elihu Dwight Holton and Nancy (Grout) Holton. Holton attended public schools and the academy of Rockingham, and afterwards pursued medicine. He studied with doctor J. H. Warren of Boston and later Valentine Mott of New York, graduating at the New York University School of Medicine in 1860 with the degree of Doctor of Medicine. After six months of dispensary work in Williamsburg, Brooklyn, he established a practice in Putney, Vermont. His practice there was that of a general practitioner, In 1867 he removed to Brattleboro, Vermont, where he spent the rest of his life. His practice extended into Massachusetts and New Hampshire.

Holton married Ellen Hoit of Saxtons River on 1862. His wife died in 1909, and Holton died at his home in Brattleboro on February 12, 1917, as a result of pancreatic disease.
