= List of newspapers in Vermont =

This is a list of newspapers in Vermont.

== Dailies ==
- Barre Montpelier Times Argus - Barre, Vermont
- Bennington Banner - Bennington, Vermont
- Brattleboro Reformer - Brattleboro, Vermont
- Burlington Free Press - Burlington, Vermont
- Caledonian-Record - St. Johnsbury, Vermont
- Newport Daily Express - Newport, Vermont
- Rutland Herald - Rutland, Vermont

== Weeklies ==
- Addison County Independent - Addison County, Vermont
- The Chronicle - Barton, Vermont
- Bradford Journal Opinion - Bradford, Vermont
- The Citizen - Charlotte and Hinesburg, Vermont
- The Commons - Brattleboro, Vermont
- Deerfield Valley News - Wilmington, Vermont
- Franklin County Courier- Enosburg Falls, Vermont
- Hardwick Gazette - Hardwick, Vermont
- Lake Champlain Islander - North Hero, Vermont
- Manchester Journal - Manchester, Vermont
- News & Citizen - Morrisville, Vermont
- The Mountain Times - Killington, Vermont
- Northfield News - Northfield, Vermont
- The Other Paper - South Burlington, Vermont
- White River Valley Herald - Randolph, Vermont
- Seven Days - Burlington, Vermont
- Shelburne News - Shelburne, Vermont
- St. Albans Messenger - St. Albans, Vermont (twice a week)
- Stowe Reporter - Stowe, Vermont
- The Vermont Standard - Woodstock, Vermont
- Washington World - Barre, Vermont
- Williston Observer - Williston, Vermont

== Monthlies ==
- Cabot Chronicle - Cabot, Vermont
- North Avenue News - Burlington, Vermont
- North Star Monthly —Danville, Vermont
- The Bridge - Montpelier, Vermont - publishes twice a month

== Online only ==
- VT Digger (Website)
- Springfield Reporter - Springfield, Vermont - publishes weekly
- Stowe Today - Stowe, Vermont
- The Chester Telegraph (Website)
- The Newport Dispatch (Website)
- The Waterbury Roundabout (Website)
- Vermont Daily Chronicle (Website)
- Winooski News - Winooski, Vermont
- The Rake (Website)

Newspapers that have ended their print editions and moved to only publishing online include:

- Colchester Sun - Colchester, Vermont
- Essex Reporter - Essex, Vermont
- Milton Independent - Milton, Vermont

== Defunct newspapers ==
- Bennington Evening Banner (?-1961)
- Cronaca sovversiva (Barre) (1903–1920)
- Middlebury Free Press – Middlebury, Vermont
- Middlebury Register – Middlebury, Vermont
- Le Patriote Canadien - Burlington (1839–1840)
- Vermont Record – Brandon, Vermont
- Waterbury Record - Waterbury, Vermont (2007-2020)
