= Burlington metropolitan area, Vermont =

- Combined Statistical Area
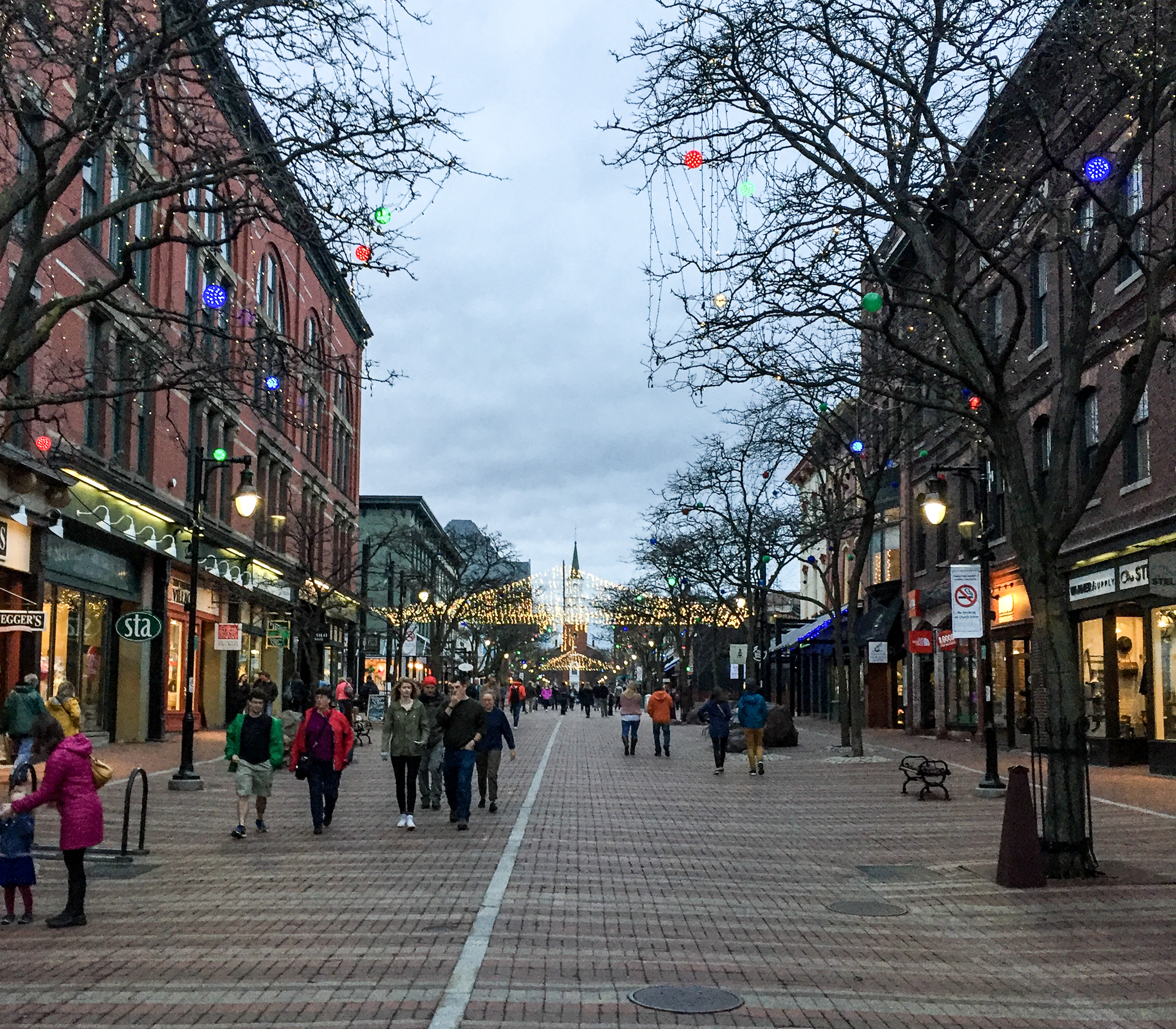
- Church Street Marketplace
Map of Burlington–South Burlington–Barre, VT CSA
City of Burlington
Burlington–South Burlington, VT MSA
Barre, VT µSA
- Country: United States
- State: Vermont
- Principal cities: Burlington; South Burlington; Barre
- Other cities: Colchester; Essex; Montpelier
- Time zone: UTC−5 (EST)
  - Summer (DST): UTC−4 (EDT)

The Burlington metropolitan area is a metropolitan area consisting of the three Vermont counties of Chittenden, Franklin, and Grand Isle. The metro area is anchored by the principal cities of Burlington, South Burlington, St. Albans, Winooski, and Essex Junction; and the towns of Colchester, Essex and Milton. According to the 2020 U.S. census, the metro area had a population of 225,562, approximately one third of Vermont's total population; in 2023, the estimated population was 227,942.

The Office of Management and Budget defines the area as one of its metropolitan statistical areas (the Burlington–South Burlington metropolitan statistical area), a designation used for statistical purposes by the U.S. Census Bureau and other agencies. The MSA designation represents the counties containing the contiguous urbanized area centered on the city of Burlington, plus adjacent counties that are socially and economically linked to the urban core (as measured by commuting). An alternative definition using towns instead of counties as basic units was the Burlington–South Burlington New England City and Town Area (NECTA). Tabulating census data by NECTA definitions was discontinued when the OMB updated the statistical area definitions effective July 2023. The Burlington–South Burlington–Barre, VT combined statistical area adds Washington County (defined as the Barre, VT micropolitan statistical area) and the MSA, with a 2023 estimated population of 288,084.

== Counties ==
List of counties making up the MSA:

- Chittenden
- Franklin
- Grand Isle

== Towns and cities ==
List of towns/cities making up the NECTA:

- Bakersfield
- Bolton
- Bristol
- Burlington (Principal city)
- Cambridge
- Charlotte
- Colchester
- Duxbury
- Essex
- Essex Junction
- Hinesburg
- Huntington
- Fairfax
- Fairfield
- Ferrisburgh
- Fletcher
- Georgia
- Grand Isle
- Jericho
- Milton
- Monkton
- North Hero
- Richmond
- St. Albans (city)
- St. Albans (town)
- St. George
- Shelburne
- South Burlington (Principal city)
- South Hero
- Starksboro
- Swanton
- Underhill
- Vergennes
- Westford
- Williston
- Winooski

== Demographics ==
Historical population
Census	Pop.	Note	%±
1960	106,826		—
1970	133,987		25.4%
1980	154,935		15.6%
1990	177,059		14.3%
2000	198,889		12.3%
2010	211,261		6.2%
2020	225,562		6.8%
U.S. Decennial Census

As of the census of 2000, there were 198,889 people, 75,978 households, and 49,311 families residing within the MSA. The racial makeup of the MSA was 95.43% White, 0.74% African American, 0.58% Native American, 1.53% Asian, 0.02% Pacific Islander, 0.30% from other races, and 1.40% from two or more races. Hispanic or Latino of any race were 0.94% of the population.

== Economy ==
The metro had a gross metropolitan product of $8.38 billion in 2004, 38.2% of the total for the state. Personal income was $7 billion.

=== Personal income ===
The median income for a household in the MSA was $44,122, and the median income for a family was $51,690. Males had a median income of $35,363 versus $26,070 for females. The per capita income for the MSA was $21,175.

The median wage in the area in 2008 was $16.47 hourly or $34,258 annually. This was 7.6% higher than in the rest of the state.

=== Industry ===
The largest industrial facility in Vermont is GlobalFoundries's semiconductor plant in Essex Junction. GlobalFoundries took over the plant in June 2015, after IBM ceased operations at the plant. As of 2008, GE Healthcare employed 780 people in Burlington.

Companies headquartered in the metro area include:

- Dealer.com, headquartered in Burlington
- Burton Snowboards, headquartered in Burlington
- Lake Champlain Chocolates, headquartered in Burlington
- Seventh Generation, Inc., headquartered in Burlington
- Ben & Jerry's Homemade, Inc., headquartered in South Burlington
- Vermont Student Assistance Corporation, headquartered in Winooski
- MyWebGrocer, headquartered in Winooski
- Hack Club, headquartered in Shelburne, Vermont
- Pet Food Warehouse Vermont, headquartered in South Burlington

Hospitals include University of Vermont Medical Center in Burlington and Colchester and Northwestern Medical Center in St. Albans.

=== Volunteers ===
The metropolitan area ranked ten points higher than the US average, helping to propel the state to ninth in the country for volunteerism for the period 2005–8. 37.4% of the population volunteered during this period. The national average was 26.4%. The local average annual number of hours was 40.8.

== Public health and safety ==
One study ranked the area fourth highest in gun safety, out of 100.

== Media ==
There are four network-affiliated television stations in the city. They include WFFF channel 44 (Fox), its sister station, WVNY channel 22 (ABC), WPTZ channel 5 NBC, and WCAX channel 3 (CBS). WCAX, WFFF, and WPTZ operate news departments. WCAX is the only Burlington-based news department, while WPTZ is licensed in Plattsburgh, New York yet operates out of South Burlington. WFFF and WVNY are also based in Colchester.

Vermont PBS is based in Colchester.

The CW affiliate WNNE channel 31 is based out of Montpelier but serves the Burlington market.

Comcast Communications is the city's major cable television service provider. Residents within the city limits are also served by municipally owned Burlington Telecom.

These public access channels are Burlington based: Public-access television VCAM-Channel 15, RETN-Channel 16, and Channel 17.

Newspapers published in the Burlington metropolitan area include:

- Burlington Free Press - Burlington, Vermont
- St. Albans Messenger - St. Albans, Vermont
- Franklin County Courier - Enosburg Falls, Vermont
- The Islander - North Hero, Vermont
- Milton Independent - Milton, Vermont
- The Other Paper - South Burlington, Vermont
- Seven Days - Burlington, Vermont
- Shelburne News - Shelburne, Vermont
- Williston Observer - Williston, Vermont

== See also ==
- Vermont statistical areas
- New England City and Town Area
