= WXXX =

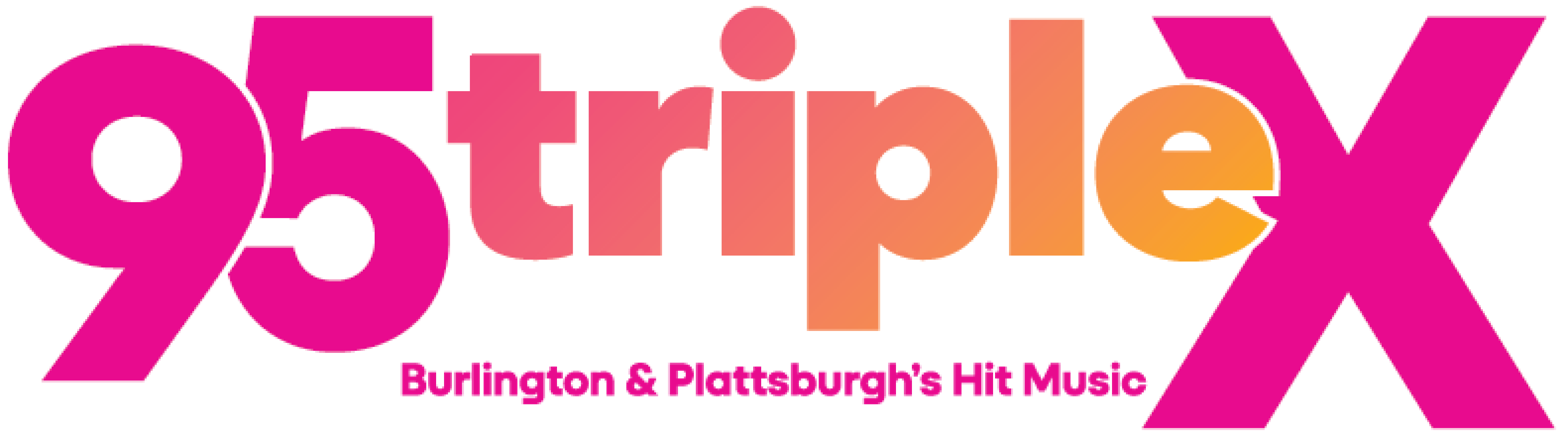
- South Burlington, Vermont; United States
- Broadcast area: Burlington metropolitan area
- Frequency: 95.5 MHz
- Branding: 95 Triple X

Programming
- Language: English
- Format: Contemporary hit radio
- Affiliations: Premiere Networks; United Stations Radio Networks

Ownership
- Owner: Sison Broadcasting, Inc.
- Operator: Vox AM/FM, LLC
- Sister stations: WVMT; WCPV; WEAV; WEZF; WVTK; WXZO

History
- First air date: November 16, 1984
- Call sign meaning: "Triple X"

Technical information
- Licensing authority: FCC
- Facility ID: 29920
- Class: C3
- ERP: 25,000 watts
- HAAT: 72 meters (236 ft)
- Transmitter coordinates: 44°30′34″N 73°10′57″W

Links
- Public license information: Public file; LMS
- Webcast: Listen live
- Website: www.95triplex.com

WXXX (95.5 FM, 95 Triple X) is a commercial radio station licensed to South Burlington, Vermont, and serving the Champlain Valley. The station is owned by Sison Broadcasting, and airs a top 40–contemporary hit radio format. WXXX's studios and offices are on Mallets Bay Avenue in Colchester, Vermont.

== History ==
WXXX (95 Triple-X) first signed on the air on November 16, 1984. The first song was "Start Me Up" by The Rolling Stones. WXXX was at first authorized by the Federal Communications Commission to operate at 3,000 watts on 95.3 MHz. At that time it was owned by several Vermont broadcasters including Howard Ginsberg, John Hughes and John Nichols. They sold the station in 1986, to a Boston-based company. It was subsequently sold again to Atlantic Ventures, another Boston-based firm. After that it was purchased by the owners of 620 WVMT in Burlington, Vermont. In November 1995, WXXX upgraded its signal, increasing power to 25,000 watts and moving to 95.5 MHz.

In October 2018, WXXX and WVMT were sold to Vox AM/FM LLC pending FCC approval; Vox began operating the stations under a local marketing agreement on January 1, 2019. The next day, as part of some major lineup changes, 95 Triple X began carrying Elvis Duran and the Morning Show.
