= WFFF-TV =

Television station in Burlington, Vermont

- Burlington, Vermont; Plattsburgh, New York; United States
- City: Burlington, Vermont
- Channels: Digital: 16 (UHF); Virtual: 44
- Branding: Fox 44

Programming
- Affiliations: 44.1: Fox; for others, see § Subchannels

Ownership
- Owner: Nexstar Media Group; (Nexstar Media Inc.)
- Sister stations: WVNY

History
- Founded: May 6, 1994
- First air date: August 31, 1997
- Former channel numbers: Analog: 44 (UHF, 1997–2009); Digital: 43 (UHF, 2006–2020)
- Former affiliations: The WB (secondary, 1999–2006); The CW (secondary 2006–2007, DT2 2007–2013)
- Call sign meaning: "Fox Forty Four"

Technical information
- Licensing authority: FCC
- Facility ID: 10132
- ERP: 40 kW
- HAAT: 839 m (2,753 ft)
- Transmitter coordinates: 44°31′33.19″N 72°48′55.44″W

Links
- Public license information: Public file; LMS
- Website: www.mychamplainvalley.com

WFFF-TV (channel 44) is a television station licensed to Burlington, Vermont, United States, serving as the Fox affiliate for the Burlington, Vermont–Plattsburgh, New York market. It is owned by Nexstar Media Group and operated alongside ABC affiliate WVNY (channel 22). The two stations share studios on Mountain View Drive in Colchester, Vermont; WFFF-TV's transmitter is located on Vermont's highest peak, Mount Mansfield.

Like other network stations serving Burlington and Plattsburgh, WFFF-TV has a large audience in southern Quebec, Canada. This includes Montreal, a city that is 10 times more populous than the station's entire U.S. viewing area, as well as the Montérégie region. Most Vidéotron systems in southern Quebec carry WFFF-TV as their Fox affiliate.

== History ==
=== Early years ===
WFFF-TV signed on August 31, 1997. Prior to the station's launch, Burlington/Plattsburgh was the last top-100 television market without a primary Fox affiliate; CBS affiliate WCAX-TV aired Fox Sports and Fox Kids programming, while the network's full schedule was available on cable systems in most of Vermont via Foxnet; the extreme southern portion of the Champlain Valley (corresponding to the Glens Falls metropolitan area) was well served by Albany Fox affiliate WXXA-TV, which was not receivable in northern New York or southern Quebec. Cable systems in northeastern New York had imported network flagship WNYW from New York City, while Canadian cable systems carried WUTV from Buffalo or WUHF from Rochester. Between 1995 and 2001, Fox programming was available over-the-air in northern New Hampshire via WMUR-LP, a repeater of ABC affiliate WMUR-TV. WFFF-TV was originally owned by Champlain Valley Telecasting, but was operated by Heritage Media, owner of NBC affiliate WPTZ, through a local marketing agreement (LMA).

WFFF-TV originally planned to broadcast its analog channel 44 signal from Mount Mansfield; however, while the Federal Communications Commission (FCC) granted a construction permit, the station was unable to secure approval from the Mount Mansfield Collocation Association. As a result, after three years of attempts, it was forced to transmit from WPTZ's tower on Terry Mountain in Peru, New York under special temporary authority, resulting in less over-the-air coverage of the eastern portion of the market than anticipated. WFFF-TV, along with the other Burlington–Plattsburgh stations, were able to sign their digital signals on the air from Mount Mansfield in 2006, but its analog signal remained on Terry Mountain until 2009.

Shortly before WFFF-TV began broadcasting, Heritage Media announced the sale of its broadcasting properties, including WPTZ and the LMA with WFFF-TV, to Sinclair Broadcast Group; soon after taking over in early 1998, Sinclair sold WPTZ and the WFFF-TV LMA to Sunrise Television. Sunrise promptly swapped WPTZ to Hearst-Argyle Television but transferred WFFF-TV's non-license assets to Smith Broadcasting (which, like Sunrise, was controlled by Robert Smith); soon afterward, the station began to operate independently of WPTZ. Smith bought WFFF-TV outright a year later.

In February 1999, WFFF-TV began airing thirty-second daily vignettes called Vermont's Most Wanted along with sister program Citizen's Patrol. The efforts were produced in cooperation with local law enforcement and the Champlain Valley branch of the national Crimestoppers non-profit organization.

=== The WB era ===
The station added a secondary affiliation with The WB in 1999, after WBVT-LP (later WGMU-LP) dropped that network in favor of UPN. For a time, the two hours of prime time programming from The WB aired in separate two hour-long blocks weeknights at 5 and 10. In 2002, WFFF-TV moved the entire two hours of programming to a delayed basis at 10 p.m. after Fox prime time in continuous block named "The WB Time". WFFF-TV also cleared the Kids' WB blocks (as well as the Daytime WB block that replaced the weekday block in early 2006), in addition to Fox's own children's programming. Despite the secondary affiliation, area cable systems continued to carry WPIX, New York City's WB affiliate.

The death of Bob Smith (head of family-owned Smith Broadcasting) in 2003 led to the family's decision in 2004 to sell its group of stations to an investment group called Smith Media, LLC. After researching markets where the company now had ownership in, it was discovered WVNY was up for sale. Finding a way to satisfy FCC ownership rules, Smith Media partnered with Lambert Broadcasting and became the senior partner in a local marketing agreement with WVNY. Smith Media shut down that station's longtime facilities in South Burlington (which housed a news department between August 1999 and September 2003), reduced redundant staff, and relocated its operations into WFFF-TV's Colchester facilities. This arrangement placed WFFF-TV in the unusual position of being the senior partner as a Fox-affiliated station in a virtual duopoly with an ABC affiliate (most virtual or legal duopolies involving a Fox affiliate and a Big Three-affiliated station result in the Fox affiliate serving as the junior partner).

=== The change ===
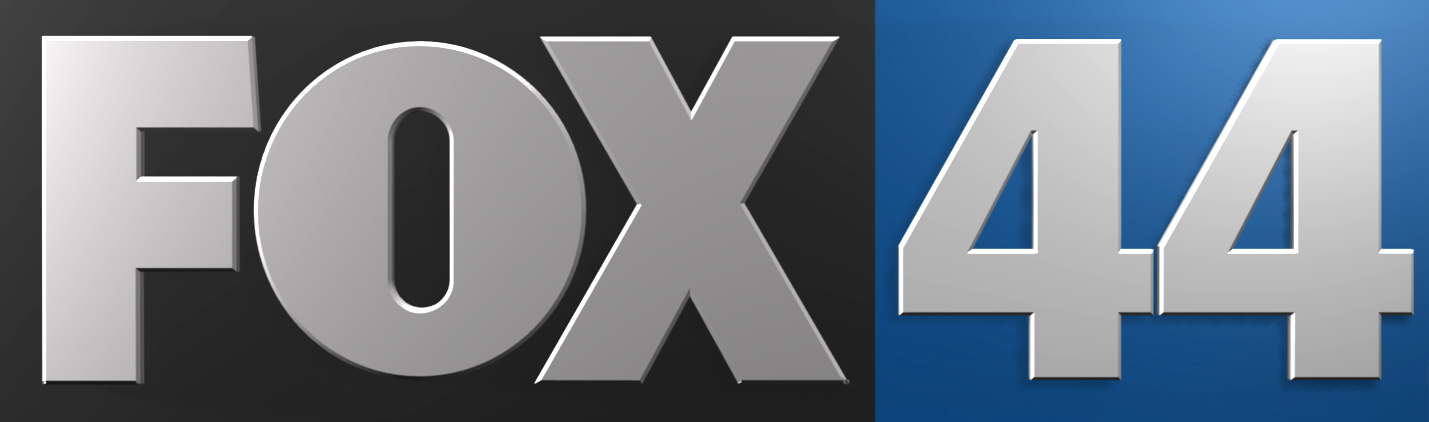
Logo of the television channel used between 2007 and 2013

When The WB and UPN were shut down to create The CW in September 2006, WFFF-TV became a secondary affiliate of the new network, airing its prime time programming in the same block that formerly housed WB programming. CW programming moved to a new digital subchannel of WFFF-TV on September 27, 2007; the subchannel immediately replaced WPIX on Comcast's Vermont systems, with Charter Communications in New York State following suit on New Year's Eve. The subchannel continued to carry CW programming until March 4, 2013, when WPTZ's subchannel assumed the CW affiliation for the Burlington–Plattsburgh market, leaving WFFF-TV's subchannel with only syndicated programming until October 1, 2013, when it shut down and was replaced over the air with a standard definition feed of the main channel.

The station became digital-only effective February 17, 2009. As a result, some parts of the viewing area were left without a full-powered Fox affiliate including Enosburg in Franklin County, Vermont as well as parts of Franklin and Essex Counties in New York State.

Due to an ongoing retransmission dispute, Time Warner Cable replaced WFFF-TV with WNYF-CD from Watertown and Massena, New York, on December 16, 2010. Its CW subchannel was also dropped, though the network remained available through WPIX. Sister station WVNY was simultaneously replaced with future sister station WUTR from Utica, New York. On the same date, sister station WKTV, the NBC affiliate in Utica, was replaced by another of WFFF-TV's future sister stations, WBRE-TV from Wilkes-Barre, Pennsylvania, and its CW-affiliated subchannel with HBO Family for the same reason. WFFF-TV was restored on January 8, 2011, after a new deal (the terms of which both sides refused to reveal) was reached with Time Warner.

=== Nexstar era ===
Smith Media agreed to sell WFFF-TV to Nexstar Broadcasting Group on November 5, 2012. Concurrently, Lambert Broadcasting sold WVNY to Mission Broadcasting, whose stations are all operated by Nexstar through shared services agreements. On February 5, 2013, The FCC approved the sale of WFFF-TV. The transaction was completed on March 1, leaving Utica NBC affiliate WKTV as Smith Media's only remaining television station property.

On January 27, 2016, it was announced that Nexstar would buy Media General for $4.6 billion. WFFF and WVNY became part of "Nexstar Media Group", joining a cluster of television stations Nexstar owns in New England, including ABC affiliate WTNH in New Haven, Connecticut, CBS affiliate WPRI-TV in Providence, Rhode Island, and NBC affiliate WWLP in Springfield, Massachusetts. In addition, WFFF and WVNY also became sisters with fellow Fox and ABC affiliates WXXA-TV and WTEN, respectively, in Albany, New York. These stations also serve Bennington County, Vermont, making Nexstar responsible for Fox and ABC programming throughout the entire state of Vermont since 2022, when Windham County was moved into the Burlington–Plattsburgh market from the Boston television market.

On June 15, 2016, Nexstar announced that it has entered into an affiliation agreement with Katz Broadcasting for the Escape, Laff, Grit, and Bounce TV networks (the last one of which is owned by Bounce Media LLC, whose COO Jonathan Katz is president/CEO of Katz Broadcasting), bringing one or more of the four networks to 81 stations owned and/or operated by Nexstar, including WFFF-TV and WVNY.

=== Simultaneous substitution problems ===
WFFF-TV has significant viewership in the much larger Montreal market because it is available over the air alongside other Vermont stations and used as the Fox station on Vidéotron's cable systems. As the youngest full-power station covering the entire market, it still relies heavily on Montreal for advertising revenue while the area's other stations have somewhat lessened their dependence on advertising. In 2003 and 2004, WFFF-TV was involved in a "commercial war" with Montreal's CJNT-TV. For some time, its commercials on non-network programs such as That '70s Show were blocked by simultaneous substitution, also known as "simsubbing" or "signal substitution", on Montreal cable systems. Under Canadian Radio-television and Telecommunications Commission (CRTC) regulations, simultaneous substitution demanded the cable companies in Canada replace WFFF-TV's signal with CJNT-TV's signal when the same program and episode was running at the same time. This is the same practice as the FCC's syndication exclusivity rule in the United States.

In response, WFFF-TV frequently shifted its schedule to keep its commercials from being blocked in Montreal. In response to this station's schedule shuffling, CJNT moved its schedule accordingly to retain simsub rights. This resulted in a cat-and-mouse game of changing programming schedules every few weeks leaving viewers confused. The changes usually occurred with little to no advance warning, sometimes making local schedules in TV Guide (both U.S. and Canadian versions) outdated by the time they were published. WFFF-TV eventually solved the problem by adding a second daily airing of That '70s Show, giving it access to a second strip of programming from the distributor which was available only to stations carrying a full hour of the program. It would then flip the two airings so the exclusive strip was shown in the shared time slot, meaning CJNT could no longer simsub the program since WFFF-TV was not airing the same episode.

== WFFF-DT2 ==
WFFF-DT2 is the Ion Mystery–affiliated second digital subchannel of WFFF-TV, broadcasting in standard definition on channel 44.2. The subchannel was formerly a CW-affiliated and later independent station.

During its time as a CW affiliate, WFFF-DT2 carried the branding "The CW Burlington", it changed it to "44.2 EFFF" when it became independent. There was no website for the station besides a link to program listings on its parent station's website. It temporarily ceased programming after September 30, 2013, and was replaced over the air by a standard definition feed of its parent station a few days later. It resumed operations on August 23, 2016, as an affiliate of Escape (later rebranded as Court TV Mystery, now Ion Mystery).

=== History ===
On January 24, 2006, The WB and UPN announced the two networks would cease broadcasting and merge. The new combined service would be called The CW. The letters would represent the first initials of corporate parents CBS (the parent company of UPN) and the Warner Bros. unit of Time Warner. Until The CW's launch on September 18, it was unknown if there would be an affiliate in Burlington and Plattsburgh. Just before the launch date, it was announced The CW would air on WFFF-TV on a delayed basis at 10 p.m. as did programming from The WB. Before it was officially confirmed it would be a secondary CW affiliate, there was a possibility new television station WCWF (now WYCI) in Saranac Lake, New York would become affiliated with the network.

As was the case with the previous network, The CW would also be available on cable in the area through affiliate WPIX from New York City. It was unlikely Class A UPN affiliate WGMU-CA would have been affiliated with The CW, since network officials were on record as preferring the "stronger" WB and UPN affiliates and, despite secondary status, WFFF-TV was by far the stronger station with its full-powered signal. WGMU-CA would subsequently join MyNetworkTV, a programming service owned by Fox.

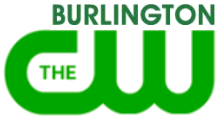
Logo as a CW affiliate, 2007–2013.

On September 27, 2007, WFFF-TV moved The CW to its second digital subchannel. For Comcast viewers in Vermont, WFFF-DT2 immediately replaced WPIX. The subchannel was initially going to carry the branding "The CW 20" after its channel location on Comcast in Burlington. At its launch, the station branded itself as "The CW Burlington".

It was not until December 31, 2008, when Charter systems in New York State added the channel. It was not available on cable in Canada or some providers' basic tiers within its home market such as Saranac Lake where Time Warner Cable offered WPIX instead. Smith Media agreed to sell WFFF-TV (and thus WFFF-DT2) to the Nexstar Broadcasting Group on November 5, 2012. The sale was finalized on March 1, 2013.

Despite having a similar logo to CW Plus affiliates and being on a digital subchannel, WFFF-DT2 was not part of that service during its tenure with the network.

On March 4, 2013, WPTZ-DT 5.2 assumed the CW affiliation for the Plattsburgh–Burlington market from WFFF-DT2. As a result, WFFF-DT2 replaced CW prime time programming with Extra, omg! Insider, Access Hollywood, and TMZ. The Bill Cunningham Show, which was aired weekday afternoons via The CW, was replaced with a second episode of The Wendy Williams Show, and the Saturday morning Vortexx block was replaced with Litton's Weekend Adventure. (WFFF-DT2 was the only non-ABC affiliate to carry Litton's Weekend Adventure; the block was shared with sister station and ABC affiliate WVNY.) The station dropped the brand name "The CW Burlington" and began referring to itself on-air as "44.2 EFFF".

The station temporarily ceased programming as of October 1, 2013, and was replaced over the air with a standard definition feed of its parent station a few days later. Some of its programs were moved to WFFF-TV or WVNY.

Due to the Nexstar affiliation agreement with Katz Broadcasting on June 15, 2016, for the Escape, Laff, Grit, and Bounce TV networks, WFFF-DT2 resumed operations two months after that carrying programs from Escape (which is now known as Ion Mystery).

== News operation ==
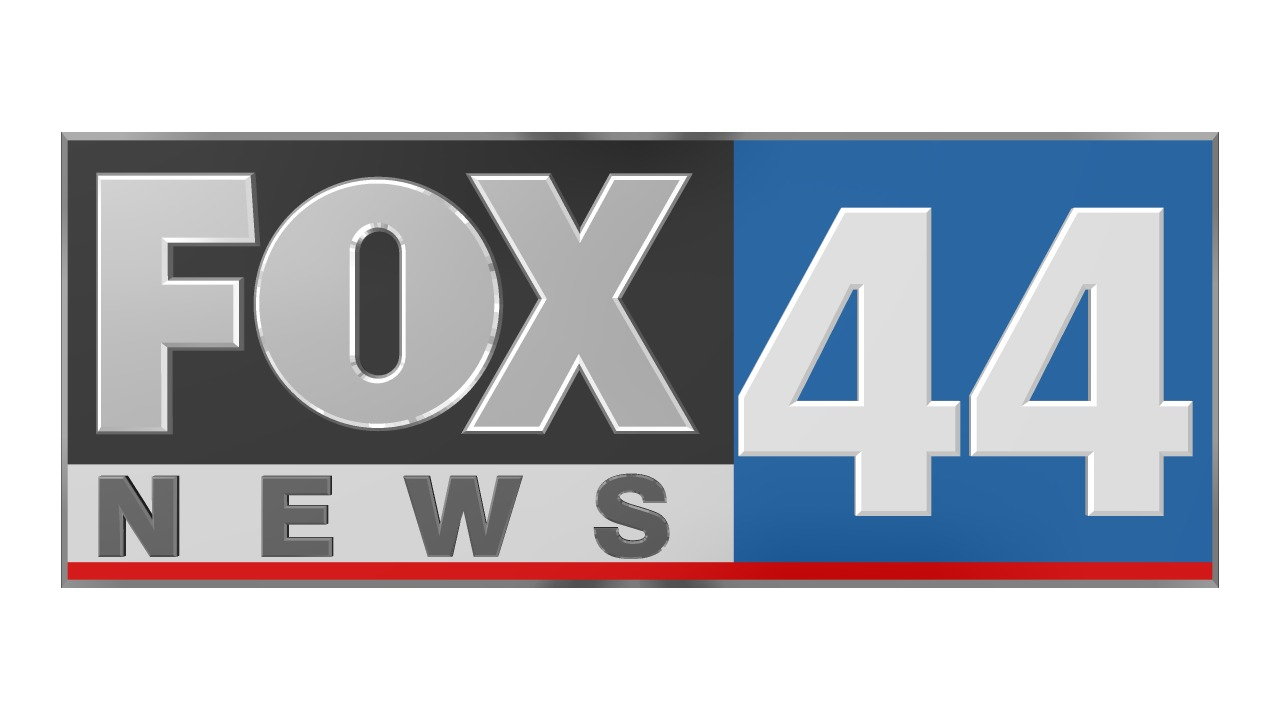
Former Fox 44 News logo

After WVNY moved into WFFF-TV's studios in 2005, Smith Media made an announcement the company was planning to establish a news department for the two stations. However, after the 2006 creation of The CW and WFFF-TV initially airing the network's programming in prime time at 10, there was some doubt as to the status of the local news operation launch. In May 2007, News Director Kathleen Harrington was hired to begin the creation of the news department. Construction of the newsroom and studio were underway by late summer and rehearsals began in August. On November 26, advertisements began appearing on WFFF-TV and WVNY for the launch of the 10 p.m. newscast which occurred December 3.

The broadcast, known as Fox 44 News at 10, originally ran every night for a half-hour but the weeknight show eventually expanded to 45 minutes on September 7, 2009. This is followed by a fifteen-minute sports highlight show known as Sports Wrap. The first ten minutes of the news portion of the program airs in a format called "10 Minute Advantage" where the top stories of the day and a complete weather forecast are shown before a commercial break. WFFF-TV is the area's first local news operation presented in high definition.

On March 3, 2008, WFFF-TV added a weeknight and Saturday broadcast at 7 on WVNY known as Fox 44 Local News on ABC. As a result, that station became first in the area to offer local news in the time slot. The move to launch the show was due in part to tough competition of newscasts at 6 seen on WCAX-TV and WPTZ. As is the case on WFFF-TV, the WVNY broadcasts are aired in high definition. The Saturday edition eventually moved to 6:30 which has been the case on Sundays from the start in order to accommodate ABC programming. The WVNY broadcasts mark the return of local news on that station since it shut down its own news department on September 12, 2003. Initially, the only "ABC 22" identification seen during the show was in the intro package and the "bug" in the bottom right hand corner of the screen.

On August 18, 2008, WFFF-TV began airing a two-hour weekday morning show called Fox 44 Local News This Morning. Included in the launch were local news and weather cut-ins on WVNY during its airing of Good Morning America. This occurs at 25 and 55 minutes past the hour, in which at those times the two stations simulcast each other. Eventually, an additional hour of the broadcast starting at 6 was added to WVNY and is known as ABC 22 This Morning. That station has since expanded it to a traditional two-hour newscast. At some point in time, WVNY added nightly broadcasts at 6 and 11 becoming more of a big three affiliate offering local news competing with WCAX-TV and WPTZ even though WFFF-TV produces the broadcasts, since WFFF-TV is legally the senior partner in the duopoly. All newscasts seen on that station were formerly known as ABC 22 News, but are now known as Local 22 News, as has been the theme on many Nexstar stations as of late.

Due to the relatively new status of the news department, there is a Vermont focus in coverage. During weather forecast segments, WFFF-TV uses live NOAA National Weather Service radar data from three regional sites. It is presented on-screen in a system known as "Sky Tracker HD Triple Doppler". Weather forecasts from WFFF-TV can be heard on WSNO (1450 AM), WMOO (92.1 FM), WDOT (95.7 FM), WWFY (100.9 FM), WCPV (101.3 FM), WMUD (101.5 FM), WTHK (100.7 FM), WRFK (107.1 FM), WCFR (1480 AM / 106.5 FM), WEZF (92.9 FM), and WVTK (92.1 FM).

== Technical information ==
=== Subchannels ===
The station's signal is multiplexed:

Subchannels of WFFF-TV
Subchannel	Res.	Short name	Programming
44.1	720p	WFFF-DT	Fox
44.2	480i	IonMyst	Ion Mystery
44.3	480i	Bounce	Bounce TV
44.4	480i	Antenna	Antenna TV

=== Analog-to-digital conversion ===
WFFF-TV shut down its analog signal, over UHF channel 44, on February 17, 2009, the original target date on which full-power television stations in the United States were to transition from analog to digital broadcasts under federal mandate (which was later pushed back to June 12, 2009). The station's digital signal remained on its pre-transition UHF channel 43, using virtual channel 44.

As a part of the repacking process following the 2016–2017 FCC incentive auction, WFFF-TV relocated to UHF channel 16 on July 3, 2020.
