= WEAV =

- Plattsburgh, New York; United States
- Broadcast area: Champlain Valley
- Frequency: 960 kHz
- Branding: The Game FM

Programming
- Format: Sports
- Affiliations: Fox Sports Radio; Boston Bruins Radio Network; Boston Celtics Radio Network; Boston Red Sox Radio Network; New England Patriots Radio Network

Ownership
- Owner: Vox AM/FM, LLC
- Sister stations: WEZF; WCPV; WXZO; WVTK; WVMT; WXXX

History
- First air date: February 3, 1935 (as WMFF at 1310)
- Former call signs: WMFF (1935–1948)
- Former frequencies: 1310 kHz (1935–1941); 1340 kHz (1941–1948)

Technical information
- Licensing authority: FCC
- Facility ID: 52806
- Class: B
- Power: 5,000 watts
- Transmitter coordinates: 44°34′27.17″N 73°26′52.48″W
- Translators: 97.1 W246DT (Colchester, Vermont); 105.9 W290AT (Plattsburgh)

Links
- Public license information: Public file; LMS
- Webcast: Listen live
- Website: www.thegamefm.com

WEAV (960 AM) is an English-language American radio station in Plattsburgh, New York, with studios in Colchester, Vermont. The station broadcasts a sports format.

Owned and operated by Vox AM/FM, the station broadcasts on 960 kHz with a power of 5,000 watts as a class B station, using a directional antenna with slightly different daytime and nighttime directional patterns in order to protect various other stations on that frequency. Both daytime and the tighter nighttime patterns of WEAV are directed mostly to the north and west of Plattsburgh, with not a lot of signal strength reaching deep into Vermont. It also broadcasts in Burlington on FM translator 97.1 and in Plattsburgh on FM translator 105.9.

== History ==
The station signed on February 3, 1935, as WMFF, owned by Plattsburgh Broadcasting Corporation (in turn controlled by the Bissell family), and operating on 1310 kHz. The North American Regional Broadcasting Agreement in 1941 moved the station to 1340 kHz. On October 23, 1948, the station changed its call letters to WEAV; two months later, on December 29, the station relocated again, this time to the current 960 kHz. At one time an affiliate of ABC Radio and its predecessor, the Blue Network, WEAV switched to CBS Radio in the late 1950s. The station inaugurated FM service on February 3, 1960, with the launch of WEAV-FM (99.9) as a simulcast of the AM station.

By 1972, WEAV had a contemporary format, with only some of its programming simulcast on the FM (which had largely switched to another format). Within a year, the station was mixing in some country and rock music, and by 1974 WEAV-FM had ended the remaining simulcast periods and become WGFB. Soon afterward, WEAV became a top 40 station.

WEAV had again begun simulcasting with WGFB, this time relaying its soft adult contemporary format, by 1994; WEAV-exclusive programming consisted entirely of Montreal Expos games. However, by 1995, ownership was expressing concern that the high costs of running the station could not be justified given the economic conditions in the market; after WGFB was leased out and became WBTZ in 1996, WEAV went dark and was put up for sale.

WEAV returned to the air in February 1997; after briefly relaying the talk format from WZBZ (1070 AM; now WJMP), the station was leased to WXPS (96.7 FM) that July to serve as a relay, first with sports talk, and later with country. Because of WEAV's patterns, the station's signal was the perfect complement to WXPS, as WEAV reaches well into the much larger metro area of Montréal, Québec.

Separate programming returned to WEAV in April 1999, when the station flipped to a talk format. This began to be simulcast on 96.7, renamed WXZO, two years later, at which point the current "Zone" branding was adopted. A few months later, Plattsburgh Broadcasting Corporation finally sold the station, to Clear Channel Communications (which had already been operating the station via the local marketing agreement).

Clear Channel announced on November 16, 2006, that it would sell its Champlain Valley stations after being bought by private equity firms, resulting first in the addition of a third station, WTSJ (1320 AM) in Randolph, Vermont, to the simulcast in 2007 (following the sale of its previous parent station, WTSL, for the same reason), and then in a sale to Vox Communications in 2008. Vox largely removed WXZO from the simulcast on September 17 by converting it to an oldies station; both stations continued to simulcast First Light and Imus in the Morning for two years afterward. WTSJ also left the simulcast for a time in 2008 and 2009 when Vox attempted to sell the station; the simulcast ended for good in March 2010 after another deal to sell WTSJ, soon renamed WCVR, was reached.

WEAV shifted to sports talk on January 2, 2013, when CBS Sports Radio launched (though it carried some NBC Sports Radio programming as well). On October 1, 2021, WEAV rebranded as "The Game FM" and switched affiliations to Fox Sports Radio; the move marked a consolidation of Vox's sports radio stations in the Champlain Valley, as the "Game" branding and Fox Sports Radio affiliation were transferred from WCPV.

== Translators ==
Broadcast translators for WEAV
Call sign	Frequency	City of license	FID	ERP (W)	HAAT	Class	Transmitter coordinates	FCC info
W246DT	97.1 FM	Colchester, Vermont	202406	90	0 m (0 ft)	D	44°30′22.9″N 73°8′59.6″W	LMS
W290AT	105.9 FM	Plattsburgh, New York	148182	73	3.1 m (10 ft)	D	44°42′34.1″N 73°28′0.4″W	LMS
