= WXZO =

Radio station in Willsboro, New York

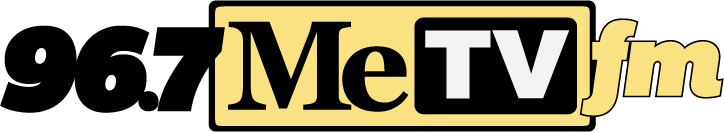
- Willsboro, New York; United States
- Broadcast area: Burlington; Plattsburgh; Champlain Valley
- Frequency: 96.7 MHz
- Branding: 96.7 MeTV FM

Programming
- Format: Soft oldies
- Network: ABC News Radio
- Affiliations: MeTV FM

Ownership
- Owner: Vox AM/FM, LLC
- Sister stations: WCPV; WEAV; WEZF; WVMT; WVTK; WXXX

History
- First air date: July 1996
- Former call signs: WWGT (1992–1996); WXPS (1996–2001)
- Call sign meaning: "Zone" (previous format)

Technical information
- Licensing authority: FCC
- Facility ID: 36422
- Class: A
- ERP: 1,000 watts
- HAAT: 243 meters (797 ft)
- Transmitter coordinates: 44.403°N 73.433°W

Links
- Public license information: Public file; LMS
- Webcast: Listen live
- Website: 967me.com

WXZO (96.7 MHz "MeTV FM") is a commercial FM radio station licensed to Willsboro, New York. Owned by Vox AM/FM, it primarily serves the Champlain Valley, including Burlington, Vermont, and Plattsburgh, New York. Its studios are located in Colchester, Vermont. The station broadcasts a soft oldies radio format using the syndicated music service known as "MeTV FM". In morning drive time, the station carries Intelligence for Your Life with John Tesh. ABC News Radio provides news updates.

WXZO is a Class A station with an effective radiated power (ERP) of 1,000 watts. The transmitter is off Empire State Trail (New York State Route 22) in Willisboro.

== History ==
=== Early years ===
The station signed on the air in July 1996. As a construction permit, its call sign was WWGT. Once it began broadcasting, the station changed its call letters to WXPS. The city of license was originally Vergennes, Vermont. WXPS aired an alternative rock format and called itself "The Pulse". Subsequently, it aired a sports radio format along with sister station WEAV (960 AM) in Plattsburgh, New York.

Capstar Broadcasting purchased WXPS in 1998. On December 14, the sports talk format, which by then also incorporated some hot talk programs, was abandoned. The new format was country music and the new moniker was "Kix 96.7".

Around the same time, WXPS moved its city of license and transmitter from Vermont to Willsboro, New York. This move improved the station's signal in Burlington, the largest city in the region. Plans for an FM translator at 97.3 MHz were abandoned and the construction permit canceled two months earlier. The following April, WEAV left the sports talk simulcast and implemented a separate talk format.

=== Smooth jazz and talk ===
In 1999, WXPS changed formats again, this time to smooth jazz. It played mostly instrumental jazz-flavored tracks with some soft R&B vocals.

In April 2001, Clear Channel Communications, which acquired the station after a series of mergers, migrated the smooth jazz format to sister station WLCQ (92.1 FM; now WVTK). Upon the completion of this move, WXPS resumed simulcasting with WEAV, this time airing its talk format under the "Zone" branding. It switched its call letters to WXZO.

=== Oldies and Top 40 ===
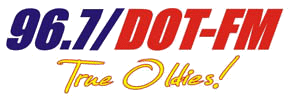
Logo as "96.7 DOT-FM", used from September 17, 2008, until September 17, 2010.

Clear Channel announced on November 16, 2006, that it would sell its Champlain Valley stations after the company was bought by several private equity firms. This prompted a sale to Vox Communications in 2008.

On September 17, Vox again ended the simulcast with WEAV (except for First Light and Imus in the Morning). WXZO adopted an oldies format, branding itself "96.7 DOT-FM" in reference to former local Top 40 station WDOT (1390 AM; later WCAT); the call sign was not changed. Much of the station's on-air staff under this format had once worked for WDOT. The oldies format was previously heard on WVTK.

On September 17, 2010, the oldies format was replaced with a contemporary hit radio format, branded "Planet 96.7". At that time, the remaining simulcasts with WEAV ceased. WXZO competed against WXXX (95.5 FM) and Adult Top 40 rival WYZY (106.3 FM, now WNBZ-FM). On August 25, 2017, WXZO flipped to rhythmic contemporary as "The New Hot 96.7".

=== MeTV FM ===
In early January 2019, following Vox's acquisition of rival Top 40 station WXXX, WXZO began stunting with a promotional loop of oldies music. It also aired liners, read in the first person, that emphasized the word "Me". The last song on WXZO as Hot 96.7 was "Love Lies" by Khalid.

On January 11, 2019, WXZO ended stunting and launched a Soft Oldies format, branded as "96.7 MeTV FM." The station said it would play a "variety of classic hits, deep tracks and softer sounds from the '60s, 70s, '80s, and beyond". The name "MeTV FM" refers to the popular MeTV television service that runs classic TV shows. Its music service also plays softer songs from the same era.
