= WVMT =

- Burlington, Vermont; United States
- Broadcast area: Champlain Valley
- Frequency: 620 kHz
- Branding: News/Talk 101.3 & 620 WVMT

Programming
- Format: News/talk
- Affiliations: ABC News Radio; Fox News Radio

Ownership
- Owner: Paul S. Goldman; (Sison Broadcasting, Inc.)
- Operator: Vox AM/FM, LLC
- Sister stations: WXXX; WCPV; WEAV; WEZF; WVTK; WXZO

History
- Founded: May 22, 1922
- First air date: October 10, 1924
- Former call signs: WCAX (1922–1963)
- Former frequencies: 360 meters (1922–1925); 1190 kHz (1926–1927); 1180 kHz (1927–1928); 1200 kHz (1928–1941); 1230 kHz (1941–1942)
- Call sign meaning: Vermont

Technical information
- Licensing authority: FCC
- Facility ID: 29923
- Class: B
- Power: 5,000 watts
- Transmitter coordinates: 44°32′4.17″N 73°13′13.46″W
- Translator: 96.3 W242BK (Colchester)
- Repeater: 101.3 WCPV (Essex, New York)

Links
- Public license information: Public file; LMS
- Webcast: Listen live
- Website: www.wvmtradio.com

WVMT (620 AM) is a commercial radio station licensed to Burlington, Vermont, United States, and serving the Champlain Valley of Vermont and New York. Owned by Paul S. Goldman and operated by Vox AM/FM, LLC, it carries a conservative talk format; WVMT is relayed on WCPV (101.3 FM) in Essex, New York, and FM translator station W242BK at 96.3 MHz, which are both owned by Vox outright. WVMT's studios are within Fort Ethan Allen in Colchester, with Vox's other stations, while the transmitter is also sited in Colchester, near Malletts Bay, and is shown on Lake Champlain navigation charts.

WVMT’s daytime signal covers most of Northern Vermont, Northeastern New York and part of Quebec, Canada. At night, the station adjusts its coverage to concentrate the signal around the Burlington and Plattsburgh, New York, areas.

== Programming ==
WVMT personalities Kurt Wright and Anthony Neary host the station's morning show, while the remainder of weekday schedule is made up of nationally syndicated conservative talk shows; WVMT is also an affiliate of The Howie Carr Show.

WVMT carries UVM Men's Hockey and Women's Basketball.

== History ==
=== University of Vermont ===
WVMT is the oldest radio station in Vermont. It began test transmissions on May 20, 1922, as WCAX, and it was owned by the University of Vermont (UVM).

In its early years, WCAX largely operated on an experimental basis, and it was not until October 10, 1924, that the station formally signed on. WCAX was run by UVM students and faculty. Most of its programming consisting of farming information from the University's Extension Service. Some reports say the call letters stood for "College of Agriculture Extension" in recognition of this service.

The station's license was granted, and the call letters assigned, on May 13, 1922. That assignment was around the same time as WCAU (now WPHT) in Philadelphia and WCAY (now WTMJ) in Milwaukee, an indication that the call letters were randomly assigned from a sequential list of available call signs. Initially operating at 833 kHz (as most stations did at that time). It moved to 1200 kHz by 1925, to 1190 kHz in 1926, to 1180 kHz in 1927, and then back to 1200 in November 1928.

=== Burlington Daily News ===
By 1931, the University of Vermont did not have the funds to continue its operation of WCAX, largely due to the need to purchase newer equipment required by the Federal Radio Commission. On June 17, it sold the station to the Burlington Daily News. At that time, the newspaper was controlled by Dr. Horatio Nelson Jackson, the first person to drive across the country in a motor car. The Daily News relaunched WCAX as a commercial station on November 4, 1931. However, under the terms of the sale, UVM continued to broadcast its programming on the station. On August 19, 1937, the station's tower was struck by lightning during a severe storm. Charles Hasbrook bought WCAX and the Burlington Daily News in 1939. The following year, the station joined the CBS Radio Network. WCAX carried CBS dramas, comedies, news, sports, game shows, soap operas and big band broadcasts during the "Golden Age of Radio".

The North American Regional Broadcasting Agreement (NARBA) required the station to move to 1230 kilocycles in 1941. The following year, WCAX moved to its current frequency, 620 kHz. Also in 1941, the Daily News was sold off. But Hasbrook retained the station through the WCAX Broadcasting Corporation. (The 1230 frequency is now occupied by WJOY).

=== Television station ===
A television station, Channel 3 WMVT, was launched on September 26, 1954. It was renamed WCAX-TV two years later. By 1960, WCAX Radio had switched from CBS to NBC Radio, even though WCAX-TV 3 remains a CBS TV network affiliate. The two stations maintained one of Vermont's largest broadcast news departments.

=== WVMT ===
In 1963, Hasbrook sold WCAX to James Broadcasting, a company controlled by Simon Goldman, that also owned WJTN in Jamestown, New York. The call letters for 620 AM were changed to WVMT. (The previous call letters remain on WCAX-TV, which, until 2017; was owned by the family of Hasbrook's stepson, Stuart T. Martin Jr.) From the 1960s through the 1980s, WVMT had a middle-of-the-road music format. The station had placed more of an emphasis on oldies by 1980, but largely remained middle-of-the-road. By 1984, the station had shifted to an adult contemporary format. A few years later, in 1986, it also incorporated some oldies titles. WVMT gained an FM sister station in 1990, when James Broadcasting purchased top 40 outlet 95.5 WXXX from Atlantic Ventures.

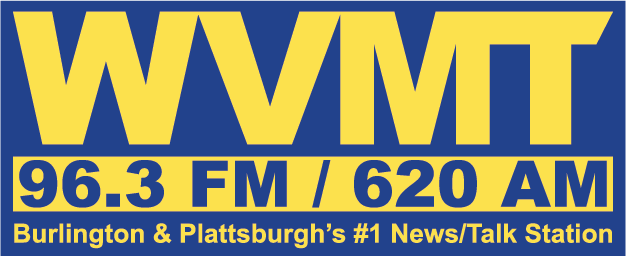
Logo before simulcasting with WCPV

By 1994, WVMT had shifted its music programming entirely to oldies, and had also incorporated some talk shows. By 1999, the station had formally moved to an all-talk format. Paul Goldman's company, Sison Broadcasting, purchased WVMT and WXXX in 1997. In October 2018, the sale of WVMT and WXXX to Vox AM/FM LLC was announced, pending FCC approval. Vox took over the stations under a local marketing agreement (LMA) on January 1, 2019. No FCC application was filed, and the stations remain in the hands of Sison Broadcasting.

On March 9, 2026, WVMT began simulcasting on WCPV (101.3 FM) in Essex, New York.

== Translator ==
Broadcast translator for WVMT
Call sign	Frequency	City of license	FID	ERP (W)	HAAT	Class	Transmitter coordinates	FCC info
W242BK	96.3 FM	Colchester, Vermont	140407	25	32.8 m (108 ft)	D	44°30′22.2″N 73°8′58.5″W	LMS

== See also ==
- List of initial AM-band station grants in the United States
