= ABC 22 =

ABC 22 may refer to one of the following television stations in the US affiliated with the American Broadcasting Company:

- WJCL (TV) in Savannah, Georgia
- WKEF in Dayton, Ohio
- WVNY in Burlington, Vermont
