= WCPV =

Simulcasting WVMT Burlington
- Essex, New York; United States
- Broadcast area: Burlington–Plattsburgh
- Frequency: 101.3 MHz
- Branding: News/Talk 101.3 & 620 WVMT

Programming
- Format: News/Talk
- Affiliations: Premiere Networks; Westwood One; New England Patriots Radio Network

Ownership
- Owner: Vox AM/FM, LLC
- Sister stations: WEZF; WXZO; WEAV; WVTK; WVMT; WXXX

History
- First air date: 1994
- Former call signs: WVZM (1992–1993); WDOT (1993–1994)
- Call sign meaning: Champlain Valley

Technical information
- Licensing authority: FCC
- Facility ID: 36269
- Class: A
- ERP: 1,000 watts
- HAAT: 241 meters (791 ft)
- Transmitter coordinates: 44°24′19.1″N 73°25′54.5″W

Links
- Public license information: Public file; LMS
- Webcast: Listen live
- Website: www.wvmtradio.com

WCPV (101.3 FM) is a commercial radio station broadcasting a news/talk radio format. Licensed to Essex, New York, United States, the station serves the Champlain Valley of New York and Vermont. Although licensed to Essex, New York, many listeners mistakenly believe that WCPV is licensed to Essex, Vermont, given that its offices and studios are located at Fort Ethan Allen in neighboring Colchester, Vermont. The station is owned by Vox AM/FM, and is a simulcast of WVMT (620 AM).

WCPV serves as the flagship station for University of Vermont men's basketball, along with sister station WEAV (960 AM). Rob Ryan previously provided the play by play, with various co-commentators.

== History ==
The station was randomly assigned the call sign of WVZM on September 2, 1992; after changing the call letters to WDOT on July 22, 1993, the station signed on in 1994 as WCPV, offering a classic rock format branded as "Champ 101.3". Initially owned by Northstar Broadcasting, the station was acquired by Capstar Broadcasting in 1998, ultimately ending up with Clear Channel Communications following several mergers. Clear Channel announced on November 16, 2006, that it would sell its Champlain Valley stations after being bought by private equity firms, resulting in a sale to Vox Communications in 2008. By 2008, after 14 years, the station moved to a mainstream rock format to go up against Hall Communications' WBTZ, leaving WIZN (a sister station to WBTZ) as the only classic rock station.

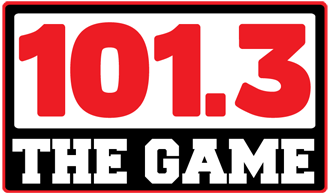
Logo as "The Game"

WCPV adopted a sports format and ESPN Radio affiliation, replacing WCAT, WFAD, and WRSA, on January 1, 2011, citing heavy competition in the rock format; almost immediately, WCAT responded by joining ESPN Radio's arch-rival, Fox Sports Radio. WCPV also replaced WEAV as the flagship station of the Vermont Lake Monsters and the Champlain Valley affiliate of the New England Patriots Radio Network.

Beginning with the 2011-2012 season, WCPV joined the Boston Bruins Radio Network, carrying all 82 regular-season Bruins games. On January 10, 2013, it was announced the station had picked up rights to Boston Red Sox games, which had run for decades on Burlington's WJOY (1230 AM).

On September 4, 2018, the station switched to Fox Sports Radio and re-branded as 101.3 The Game.

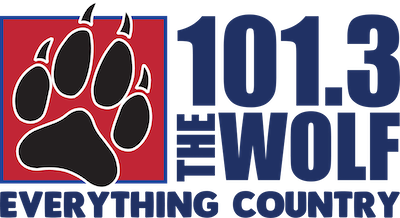
Logo as "The Wolf"

Vox AM/FM merged its two sports stations on October 1, 2021, moving the "Game" brand and programming to WEAV, which had previously carried CBS Sports Radio as "The Zone". Following a week simulcasting WEAV and a weekend of airing nature sounds as a stunt, WCPV switched to country music as "101.3 The Wolf" on October 11, 2021.

On March 9, 2026, WCPV changed its format from country to a simulcast of news/talk-formatted WVMT (620 AM).
