= WHRC-FM =

WHRC-FM refers to:

- WHRC-LP, a radio station (97.3 FM) licensed to Chippewa Falls, Wisconsin, United States
- WVTK, a radio station (92.1 FM) licensed to Port Henry, New York, United States, which held the call sign WHRC-FM from 1982 to 1985
