= Vermont Standard =

Newspaper published in Vermont, US

- Type: Weekly newspaper
- Format: Broadsheet
- Owner: Phillip Camp
- Publisher: Dan Cotter
- Editor: Tess Hunter
- Founded: 1853
- Language: English
- Headquarters: Woodstock, Vermont
- Circulation: 5,200
- OCLC number: 11509837
- Website: thevermontstandard.com

The Vermont Standard is the oldest continuously-published weekly newspaper in the U.S State of Vermont. It is based in Woodstock, Vermont. The newspaper was founded in 1853 and covers local sports, business and community events serving the town of Woodstock and the surrounding communities of Windsor County. The Vermont Standard began as an anti-alcohol publication known as the Vermont Temperance Standard. It is now owned by Phillip Camp Sr. who began working for the Standard in 1952 while still in high school. The Vermont Standard has a weekly paid circulation of 5,200 copies.

== History ==
The Vermont Standard was formed in 1853. It was owned by O. Denton Dryden from July 1941 until his death in 1975. Dryden served as editor until he retired in 1971. He was also a member of the Vermont Free Press Association and the New England Press Association, of which he was the director at the time of his death. After graduating from the Hoisington High School in 1921 and then Kansas State School of Journalism, he worked for several Kansas newspapers. He was employed by several extension offices in Montana State College, Bozeman, Montana; the University of Massachusetts, Amherst, Massachusetts; Kansas State University and University of Illinois. Dryden spent five years in Indianapolis as the director of public relations for the Farm Security Administration. On July 1, 1941, he moved to Vermont and purchased the Vermont Standard.

In 1973, a flood destroyed the entire pre-press and press operations.

The newspaper has been owned by Phillip Camp since 1980.

In 2011, the Standard's office was displaced by flooding from Tropical Storm Irene. The Vermont Standard was the worst hit among four community newspapers seriously impacted by Irene. Camp, who lost 42 years of personal items, including awards and other memorabilia in the flood, did not let the setback stop a streak of producing a local newspaper for more than 8,200 consecutive weeks. After the storm, Camp received $3,000 from a local businessman who said Camp could eventually pay him in advertising space. That week's 52-page edition, which was filled with flood-related news and pictures, was printed one day late at the Valley News in West Lebanon, New Hampshire.

In 2017 Gareth Henderson joined the Vermont Standard as its new editor. Henderson had previously been a reporter and assistant editor for the Standard before working three years as a business editor at the Rutland Herald.

In May 2018, the Vermont Standard appointed its first new publisher in 38 years, Dan Cotter.

On, Monday July 16, 2018, a fire engulfed the building that housed the Vermont Standard. Without a space to work, the newspaper's staff worked out of the Norman Williams Public Library in Woodstock so as to not break their streak of consecutive weekly publications. The Woodstock community continued to support the newspaper until it was stable again.

In June 2021, Tess Hunter was named Managing Editor.
