= Colchester School District (Vermont) =

School district in Vermont, United States

Coordinates: 44.537°N 73.169°W

Location
- Colchester, Vermont United States

District information
- Superintendent: Amy Minor
- Schools: 5

Students and staff
- Students: 2,175

Other information
- Website: www.csdvt.org

Colchester School District is a school district in Colchester, Vermont, United States.

== Schools ==
It operates the following schools:

- Colchester High School
- Colchester Middle School
- Malletts Bay School
- Porters Point School
- Union Memorial School
