= Lake Champlain Islander =

Newspaper published in Vermont, US

- Type: Weekly newspaper
- Format: Tabloid, Digital
- Owner: Tonya Poutry
- Publisher: Tonya Poutry
- Editor: Tonya Poutry
- Founded: 1974
- Headquarters: 3537 US Route 2, North Hero, VT 05474, United States
- Circulation: 4,500
- Website: theislandernewspaper.com

The Islander is an American newspaper serving Grand Isle County, Vermont with an average circulation of 4,500 copies. A free weekly paper, it is published each Tuesday. The paper's circulation fluctuates throughout the year, peaking during the summer tourism season on the islands. The editor and owner is Tonya Poutry.

In its current iteration, the paper primarily offers readers a look into the minutiae of small-town life in the Champlain Valley. Stories promote local events, such as giant pumpkin contests and spaghetti dinners, honors acts of local philanthropy, raise awareness for community fundraisers and report on town hearings.

== History ==
The paper was founded in 1974 by Phil Gimli-Mead as the first newspaper of the Champlain Islands. Gimli-Mead, a 22-year old college dropout at the time, said that he wished to fill a gap, as there was a "lack of recognition" of Grand Isle as a county. While Gimli-Mead had run for office unsuccessfully as a Democrat, he billed the new paper as strictly non-partisan: "[W]e're not a liberal, radical, or conservative paper. Those who read it can either do something about it or nothing about it."

George D. Fowler and his wife Elaine Sinclair-Fowler bought the paper in 1982.

The paper was sold in 2016 by owner George D. Fowler to Tonya Poutry, who had worked for the paper for 15 years. As part of that change in ownership, the paper's headquarters moved to the second floor of a historic North Hero building, a general store called Hero's Welcome.

== National coverage ==
The Islander made national news when it was the first to report Bernie Sanders's purchase of a third home, a lakeside weekend home in North Hero, which he purchased for $575K. The story, which was lifted to national prominence by Vermont daily Seven Days, was picked up widely in the national media.

The Islander again made national news in 2018 when it reported on a Vermont farmer who sprayed manure on a U.S. Customs and Border Protection cruiser during the summer of 2017. The farmer told the Islander that he was unhappy with immigration enforcement efforts to curb illegal immigration, saying that the agency had not done enough to prevent undocumented immigrants from working on Vermont farms.
