= WCAX-TV =

Television station in Burlington, Vermont

- Burlington, Vermont; Plattsburgh, New York; United States
- City: Burlington, Vermont (Note: Originally licensed to Montpelier, Vermont; moved to Burlington in 1955.)
- Channels: Digital: 20 (UHF); Virtual: 3
- Branding: WCAX Channel 3

Programming
- Affiliations: 3.1: CBS; for others, see § Subchannels

Ownership
- Owner: Gray Media; (Gray Television Licensee, LLC)
- Sister stations: WYCI

History
- First air date: September 26, 1954
- Former call signs: WMVT (1954–1955)
- Former channel numbers: Analog: 3 (VHF, 1954–2009); Digital: 53 (UHF, 2006–2009), 22 (UHF, 2009–2019)
- Former affiliations: Fox (secondary, 1994–1997)
- Call sign meaning: derived from former sister station WCAX radio (now WVMT)

Technical information
- Licensing authority: FCC
- Facility ID: 46728
- ERP: 423 kW
- HAAT: 845 m (2,772 ft)
- Transmitter coordinates: 44°31′32.6″N 72°48′56.1″W
- Translator(s): W23EU-D Rutland

Links
- Public license information: Public file; LMS
- Website: www.wcax.com

WCAX-TV (channel 3) is a television station licensed to Burlington, Vermont, United States, serving as the CBS affiliate for the Burlington, Vermont–Plattsburgh, New York market. It is owned by Gray Media alongside Saranac Lake, New York–licensed WYCI (channel 40), an independent station with MyNetworkTV. The two stations share studios on Joy Drive in South Burlington, Vermont; WCAX-TV's transmitter is located on Vermont's highest peak, Mount Mansfield. WCAX was the first television station in Vermont.

Like other network stations serving Burlington and Plattsburgh, WCAX-TV has a large audience in southern Quebec, Canada. This includes the Montreal area, which is five times more populous than the station's entire U.S. viewing area. Vidéotron's television services in southern Quebec carry WCAX-TV as their CBS affiliate. The station is also available on every cable system in Vermont, and statewide on DirecTV and Dish Network.

== History ==
=== Burlington Daily News ownership ===
Channel 3 traces its roots to WCAX radio, Vermont's oldest radio station, which signed on as an experimental station run by students at the University of Vermont (UVM) on May 20, 1922, and began full-time operations on October 10, 1924.

By 1931, UVM realized it was in over its head operating a radio station, so it sold WCAX to the Burlington Daily News, which relaunched it that November as a commercial radio station. Charles P. Hasbrook bought the Daily News in 1939. He sold the Daily News in 1941 (the paper is now defunct), but kept WCAX.

On September 26, 1954, Hasbrook signed on Vermont's first television station, WMVT, originally licensed to the state's capital city of Montpelier. In December 1954, the stations' parent company, WCAX Broadcasting Corporation, was renamed Mount Mansfield Television, after the location of channel 3's transmitter and tower.

=== Move to Burlington ===
In May 1955, WMVT moved its community of license from Montpelier to Burlington, the state's largest city. Burlington is just a few miles from Mount Mansfield. One month later, the station's call letters were changed to WCAX-TV to match its radio sister station. In 1958, Hasbrook turned over the station's ownership to his stepson, Dr. Stuart T. "Red" Martin Jr. Martin was an engineer by trade who assisted his stepfather in building the station from the ground up. He had already been serving as general manager since the station signed on.

Red Martin sold off WCAX radio in 1963; it is now WVMT. Martin continued to own channel 3 until his death in 2005, and was succeeded by his oldest son, Peter R. Martin.

In September 1965, WCAX-TV became the third station in its market (after WPTZ-TV and WMTW-TV), and the first in Vermont, to broadcast in color.

=== CBS and Fox affiliation ===
WCAX radio had been a CBS Radio affiliate since 1940, so channel 3 became a CBS television affiliate. It has been with the network ever since. As such, until 2017, WCAX-TV was one of the few stations in the United States (not counting network owned-and-operated stations) that has had the same owner, channel number, and primary network affiliation throughout its history. The station did hold a secondary Fox affiliation from 1994 through 1997, carrying that network's sports and children's programming.

Through this arrangement, WCAX-TV was able to carry Fox's NFL coverage, which consisted of the rights to NFC games that had been held by CBS (and thus aired on WCAX-TV) until 1994. The secondary Fox affiliation ended when WFFF-TV (channel 44) signed on in 1997. On October 25, 2006, WCAX-TV upgraded its digital signal to broadcast CBS programming in high definition.

=== Gray Television ===
On May 4, 2017, Atlanta-based Gray Television announced its intent to acquire WCAX-TV for $29 million–a handsome return on Charles Hasbrook's purchase of WCAX radio in 1939. Gray assumed operational control of the station on June 1, 2017, under a local marketing agreement (LMA).

The sale was completed on August 1. That ended the Hasbrook/Martin family's 62-year-long stewardship of the station.

=== 2019 antenna fire ===
On November 19, 2019, WCAX-TV, NBC affiliate WPTZ (channel 5) and CW+ affiliate WNNE (channel 31) were knocked off the air by a fire at their shared antenna on Mount Mansfield. The cause of the fire was unknown. The outage affected over-the-air and satellite viewers.

Cable subscribers in Vermont and New York continued to receive the three stations via direct fiber feeds. Vidéotron. a cable company in Quebec, temporarily replaced WCAX with Detroit CBS owned-and-operated station WWJ-TV.

=== WCAX-DT2 ===
Logo used as WCAXtra

In 2007, WCAX-TV began to operate a 24-hour local weather and news channel on a new digital subchannel. Originally called "Weather 3.2", and later "WCAXtra", it featured news updates and live local weather along with the FCC-required three hours of E/I-compliant children programming per week.

On weekends, if sports events ran long, the news could be found on the secondary channel, though that practice ended a few years later. A 10 p.m. newscast was seen for a while exclusively on 3.2. After it was canceled, the 5:30 program The :30 was run as a repeat in that timeslot. On April 30, 2015, the channel was replaced with the Movies! network.

== Programming ==
WCAX-TV clears the entire CBS network schedule, albeit with some network programs airing out of pattern. The CBS Dream Team block airs an hour later than on most CBS affiliates in the Eastern Time Zone, and also airs over two days (the first two hours of the block air on Saturdays and the remaining hour airs on Sunday mornings, one program airing each at different times, respectively). The station airs an alternate live feed of the CBS Evening News at 7 p.m. because of the longtime hour-long 6 p.m. newscast (which has been aired in this format on WCAX since September 9, 1968); most CBS stations in the Eastern Time Zone air the network's newscast at 6:30 p.m.

=== Local programming ===
WCAX's longest-running local programs (both dating to the founding of the station) are a daily twenty-minute agricultural information program entitled Across the Fence, produced in association with the University of Vermont Extension Service. It also airs a thirty-minute weekly public affairs show called You Can Quote Me.

In September 2006, WCAX-TV introduced its third local program called Late Night Saturday. It was produced in conjunction with Champlain College for its Media Arts Department. The program was hosted by Tim Kavanagh and aired weekly on Saturday nights. It offered local musicians and artists a chance to perform in front of a live studio audience and showcase their work. It also featured local celebrities such as Rusty DeWees and national celebrities such as Luis Guzman. It ended after three seasons.

=== Local sports coverage ===
Co-owned WYCI broadcasts New York Mets games syndicated by WPIX, as well as selected Vermont Lake Monsters and Vermont Green FC games. As WYCI's over-the-air reach is limited, all sports broadcasts are simulcast on WCAX's "3 News Now" subchannel (virtual channel 3.6) to allow coverage of the entire market. WCAX simulcast the 2025 USL League Two Championship Game, which was hosted and won by Vermont Green FC, on its main channel. It also broadcast the 2026 championship which saw Vermont Green FC defend its title.

=== News operation ===
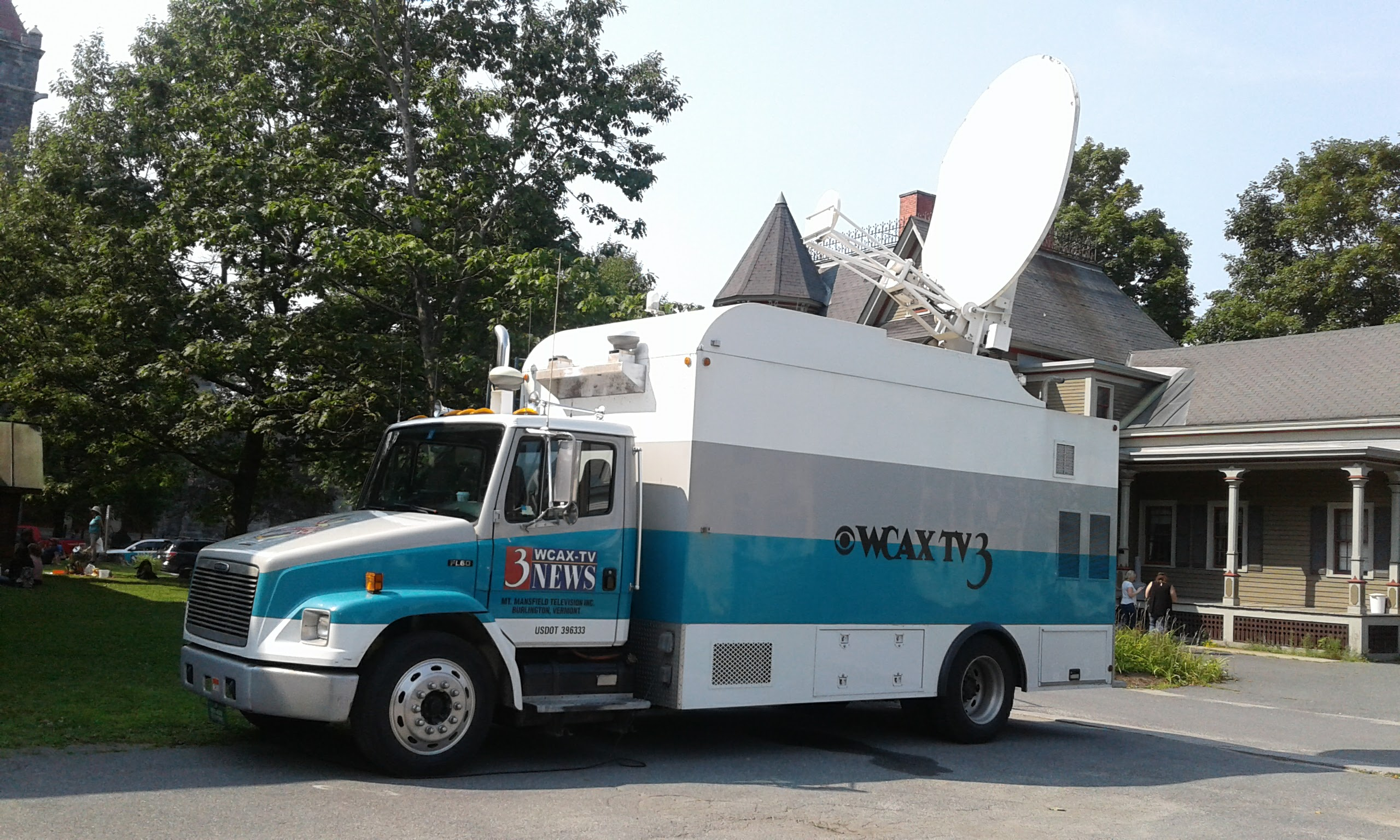
Satellite remote truck at Fairbanks Museum in Saint Johnsbury, Vermont for solar eclipse August 21, 2017.

WCAX-TV grew out of a newspaper and has long been committed to local coverage. It has more of a Vermont focus compared with WPTZ which is based across Lake Champlain in Plattsburgh, New York. In 1997, WCAX-TV launched its weekday morning show that originally ran for one hour. It later expanded to a full two-hour broadcast. Overnight, it has been carrying CBS News' Up to the Minute since October 2005 following thirteen years of not airing it. In August 2006, it launched the first website designed for mobile phone browsers.

Starting July 16, 2007, WCAX-TV began to produce a weeknight 10 o'clock broadcast on "WCAXtra" known as Channel 3 News at 10. Although it was the first prime time show in the area, Fox affiliate WFFF-TV started a 10 p.m. newscast in 2008. In 2010, WCAX-TV put the 10 p.m. newscast on hiatus, due to the majority of viewers not receiving WCAXtra via cable. On November 14, 2008, WCAX-TV relaunched its newscasts with a new look and became the first broadcaster in the area to air local news in 16:9 widescreen enhanced standard definition. However, this was not true high definition unlike WFFF-TV which has been airing its broadcasts in full 1080i resolution. In addition to its main studios, the station operates four news bureaus. An outpost in Montpelier was established in 1964 and is located on State Street (US 2) in Vermont's state capital. That was followed by bureaus located in Rutland, Vermont (on North Main Street opened in 1967), Plattsburgh (opened in 1973) and West Lebanon, New Hampshire (launched in 2002).

On December 2, 2008, the station laid off three of its employees and cut two vacant jobs. Although it declined to identify the laid-off employees, station officials stated that they were both on-air and off-air personnel. Shawna Lidsky (weekday morning sports anchor and sports reporter) and Rachael Morrow (weekday morning news producer and reporter) were two on-air personnel that were laid off. Videographer Steve Longchamp, who had worked for WCAX since 1983, was also let go. Owner Peter Martin said that declining advertising revenues due to the economic crisis caused the layoffs. Those were the first job cuts seen in the station's history.

On January 19, 2009, WCAX-TV announced that it had laid off several more employees. It specifically mentioned declining automotive commercial revenue, which is a major source of advertising for the station, as the cause of the second round of layoffs.

On May 12, 2009, at the end of the weeknight 6 p.m. broadcast, Marselis Parsons announced that he would be retiring as weeknight anchor and News Director. He stepped down as News Director at the end of May but continued anchoring the 6 p.m. newscast throughout the summer. Parsons was with WCAX-TV since 1967 and was News Director and weeknight anchor from 1984 until 2009. The station had won dozens of awards under his direction including the Radio-Television News Directors Association's "Best Television Newscast in the United States" in 2003. Parsons continued with the station as a part-time features reporter until his death in 2015. Former WCAX-TV news reporter Anson Tebbetts took over as News Director at the end of May 2009 and Senior Reporter Darren Perron began anchoring the broadcast when Parsons vacated the position.

On June 23, 2009, WCAX-TV upgraded its local news to high definition. The station switched its studio cameras to high definition (field cameras made the transition to HD later in the Fall). New graphics, flags, and intros were also put in place. The previous graphics had been used in all of its newscasts since 2000. On September 16, 2009, WCAX-TV announced that it would be hiring a full-time news reporter for the re-opening of its bureau in Rutland. During Summer 2010, WCAX-TV announced that it will be starting a weeknight 5 p.m. newscast beginning September 13. Weeknights at 5:30, a talk show was introduced, called The :30 (it has since been converted into a traditional newscast, Channel 3 News at 5:30). WCAX-TV also reopened its Plattsburgh bureau full-time. Although it had previously not aired newscasts in the weeknight 5 p.m. hour, WCAX-TV delays the CBS Evening News until 7 because it still airs an hour-long show weeknights at 6.

On September 7, 2013, WCAX-TV launched the area's second weekend morning newscast. The newscast airs on Saturday from 6 to 8 a.m. and Sunday from 8 to 9 a.m.

== In popular culture ==
Longtime WCAX meteorologist and on-air personality Stuart Hall (1921–2011) was mentioned in the acknowledgements of the 1984 Rush album Grace Under Pressure.

== Technical information ==
=== Subchannels ===
The station's signal is multiplexed:

Subchannels of WCAX-TV
Channel	Res.	Short name	Programming
3.1	1080i	WCAX-HD	CBS
3.2	480i	Movies!	Movies!
3.3	480i	H&I	Heroes & Icons
3.4	480i	StartTV	Start TV
3.5	480i	ION TV	Ion
3.6	720p	3NN	3 News Now
3.7	480i	ShopLC	Shop LC

=== Translator ===
- W23EU-D Rutland

=== Analog-to-digital conversion ===
WCAX-TV shut down its analog signal, over VHF channel 3, on February 17, 2009, the original date on which full-power television stations in the United States were to transition from analog to digital broadcasts under federal mandate (which was later pushed back to June 12, 2009). The station moved its digital signal from its pre-transition UHF channel 53, which was among the high band UHF channels (52-69) that were removed from broadcasting use as a result of the transition, to UHF channel 22 (formerly the analog channel position for ABC affiliate WVNY which now broadcasts on channel 13). Digital television receivers display WCAX-TV's virtual channel as its former VHF analog channel 3.

As a part of the repacking process following the 2016 United States wireless spectrum auction, WCAX-TV was relocated to UHF channel 20 on October 24, 2019.

== Viewership in Canada ==
The station has long had significant viewership in Montreal, which is more than ten times as large as its American coverage area. In the past, it has identified itself as serving "Burlington–Plattsburgh–Montreal" to acknowledge its Canadian viewership, though this practice largely ended in the 1990s.

Like other Champlain Valley stations, WCAX-TV once made a significant portion of its advertising sales across the border. However, Canadian advertising business has nearly dried up mostly due to the arrival of English-language station CKMI-DT-1, coupled with the Canadian simultaneous substitution regulations and the carriage of network affiliates from other United States markets (such as Boston and Detroit) on Canadian satellite and cable systems. Canada also discourages Canadian-based businesses from advertising on U.S.-based stations by not allowing tax deductions for commercials placed on stations outside of Canada.
