= The Mountain Times (Vermont newspaper) =

Newspaper in Killington, Vermont, US

- Type: Free weekly newspaper
- Owner: Polly Lynn Mikula
- Publisher: Polly Lynn Mikula and Jason Mikula
- Editor: Polly Lynn Mikula
- Founded: 1971
- Language: English
- Headquarters: Killington, VT
- Circulation: 10,000
- OCLC number: 44437619
- Website: mountaintimes.info

The Mountain Times is an American free weekly newspaper serving Killington, Vermont.

The Times It is published each Wednesday and has a circulation of over 10,000. The paper is owned by Polly and Jason Mikula. The newspaper covers Killington and surrounding towns in Rutland and Windsor Counties. The current editor is Polly Lynn Mikula.

== History ==
The paper was founded in 1971 by Ed Pickett as Killington Pico-Paper. Pickett, an advertising manager for the Mount Snow Ski Resort, also published Ski Racer and Snow Valley News. In 1976, Pickett sold the paper to Andrew Neisner, who changed the name to The Mountain Times.

In 1986, Royal and Zip Barnard bought The Mountain Times. They operated it for twenty-five years before selling it in 2011, to the Lynn/Mikula family. The sale of the paper in 2011 was delayed by significant flooding in Vermont from Tropical Storm Irene. The basement of the paper's printing office was damaged in the flood, but then-publisher Royal Barnard managed to publish an issue from his home that week.

Under the new management, the paper increased revenue by 15% by 2013.

== National coverage ==
The Mountain Times was the first to report about a proposal for Killington to secede from Vermont and join New Hampshire in 2004.

The New York Times did a story on Polly Lynn Mikula and her family Aug. 15, 2013, titled "Vermont Sisters With Roots in News Embrace Small-Town Papers"
