= Deerfield Valley News =

Newspaper published in Vermont, US

- Type: Weekly newspaper
- Format: Broadsheet
- Owner: Vermont Independent Media
- Publisher: Randy Capitani
- News editor: Mike Eldred
- Founded: 1966
- Headquarters: Wilmington, Vermont
- Circulation: 3,500
- Website: deerfieldvalleynews.org

The Deerfield Valley News is a weekly newspaper based in Wilmington in the US state of Vermont. This paper covers the Mount Snow region including the Deerfield Valley towns of Dover, Wilmington, Halifax, Wardsboro, Whitingham, Searsburg, Marlboro, Readsboro, and Jacksonville. Deerfield Valley News has a weekly paid circulation of 3,500 copies.

== History ==
The newspaper was established in 1966. As of 1980, Nancy Leach was the former editor of the Deerfield Valley News.

In 2010, the Deerfield Valley News was mentioned in the Burlington Free Press in an article entitled "Attorney general investigates Halifax Selectboard meeting". In this article about the alleged violation of Vermont's open meeting law by the Halifax Selectboard, it was said that according to the Deerfield Valley News, "former town auditor Mary Brewster filed a complaint about practices by the three-member board".

In 2011, the Wilmington area was among the worst hit by Tropical Storm Irene. The Deerfield Valley News was able to continue production and published the weekly that contained many images and news of destruction caused by the flooding. Consequently, a photograph taken by Mike Eldred of North Main Street in Wilmington engulfed in flood water was included in the Burlington Free Press.

Randy and Vicki Capitani owned The Deerfield Valley News for nearly 35 years until selling it in 2025 to Vermont Independent Media, publisher of The Commons.

== Awards ==
The paper was recognized by the Vermont Press Group at the annual Vermont Press Association awards. In 1998, Deerfield Valley News won third place for the 'Best State Story' written by Sarah Wolfe and third place for 'Feature photo' by Dawn Nieters while in 1999 the paper won second place for 'Best Local Story' by Dawn Nieters. The paper was also recognized in 2002 winning second place again for 'Best Local story' by Mike Eldred. In 2010, the Vermont Basketball Coaches Association presented Christian Avard of the Deerfield Valley News with the local media award.
