= Robert Lanou =

American physicist (1928–2026)

- Born: Robert Eugene Lanou Jr. February 13, 1928; Colchester, Vermont, U.S.
- Died: August 17, 2026 (aged 98); Providence, Rhode Island, U.S.
- Education: Worcester Polytechnic Institute; Yale University
- Occupation: Physicist
- Spouse: Cornelia Wheeler (m. 1960)

Robert Eugene Lanou Jr. (February 13, 1928 – August 17, 2026) was an American physicist.

== Early life and career ==
Lanou was born in Colchester, Vermont on February 13, 1928, the son of Robert Lanou Sr. and Flora Goyette. He attended the University of Vermont, and he enlisted in the United States Navy in 1946. After his discharge, he attended Worcester Polytechnic Institute, earning his ScB degree in physics in 1952. He also attended Yale University, earning his PhD degree in 1957.

He served as a professor in the department of physics at Brown University from 1959 to 2015. During his years as a professor, in 1966, he was named a fellow of the American Association for the Advancement of Science, and in 1968, he was named a fellow of the American Physical Society.

== Personal life and death ==
In 1960, Lanou married Cornelia Wheeler. Their marriage lasted until Lanou's death in 2026.

Lanou died at the Hope Health Hospice in Providence, Rhode Island, on August 17, 2026, at the age of 98.
