= Colchester High School (Vermont) =

School in Colchester, Vermont, United States

Location
- 131 Laker Lane; Colchester, Chittenden, Vermont 05446; United States
- Coordinates: 44.5396°N 73.2134°W

Information
- School type: public senior high school
- Motto: Equity and excellence in a climate of respect, responsibility, and pride.
- Established: 1975
- Status: public
- School district: Colchester School District
- Principal: Andrew Conforti
- Teaching staff: 57.20 (FTE)
- Grades: 9th to 12th
- Age range: 14 to 18
- Student to teacher ratio: 12.41
- Hours in school day: 6 hours and 40 minutes
- Colors: Royal blue and green
- Mascot: Champ (Lakemonster)
- Team name: Lakers
- Newspaper: The Lakeside Voice
- Website: Colchester High School

Colchester High School is a public senior high school in Colchester, Vermont, and is part of the Colchester School District in Chittenden County, Vermont. The high school serves 9th through 12th grades. Enrollment is approximately 650 to 825 students with an annual graduating class of around 170 to 230 seniors.

== Athletics ==
The school mascot is Champ, the mythical lake monster of Lake Champlain. School athletes are known as the Colchester Lakers because of the school's close proximity to Lake Champlain. The school colors are blue and green.

Fall sports are boys' and girls' soccer, football, cross country running, field hockey, and volleyball. Winter sports are boys' and girls' basketball, ice hockey (the girls' team is combined with neighboring Burlington High School), Nordic skiing, dance, alpine skiing and wrestling. Spring sports are baseball, softball, tennis, golf, croquet, ultimate, lacrosse, and boys' and girls' track and field.

=== Baseball ===
The school started playing baseball in 1976 in Division II. It moved to Division I baseball in 1979, and remains there to this day. Local player Thomas Greenblatt received an award for his pitching in 2010.

=== Football ===
The school started playing football in 1995. It first played 11 man football in 2002 and won the Vermont Division II State championship in 2009, going undefeated with a record of 11–0. It moved to Division I in 2011. Colchester was relegated to Division II following the 2021 season.

=== Soccer ===
The Colchester men's soccer team won the 1988 and 2013 Division I state championship. The Colchester women's soccer team won the 2023 Division I state championship.

=== Lacrosse ===
The Colchester men's lacrosse team won the 2013 division 2 state championship. They moved to Division I in 2014.

=== Tennis ===
The tennis department is run by Head Coaches Dave Sharkey (Boys' Tennis) and Mark Ellingson (Girls' Tennis).
