= WVTK =

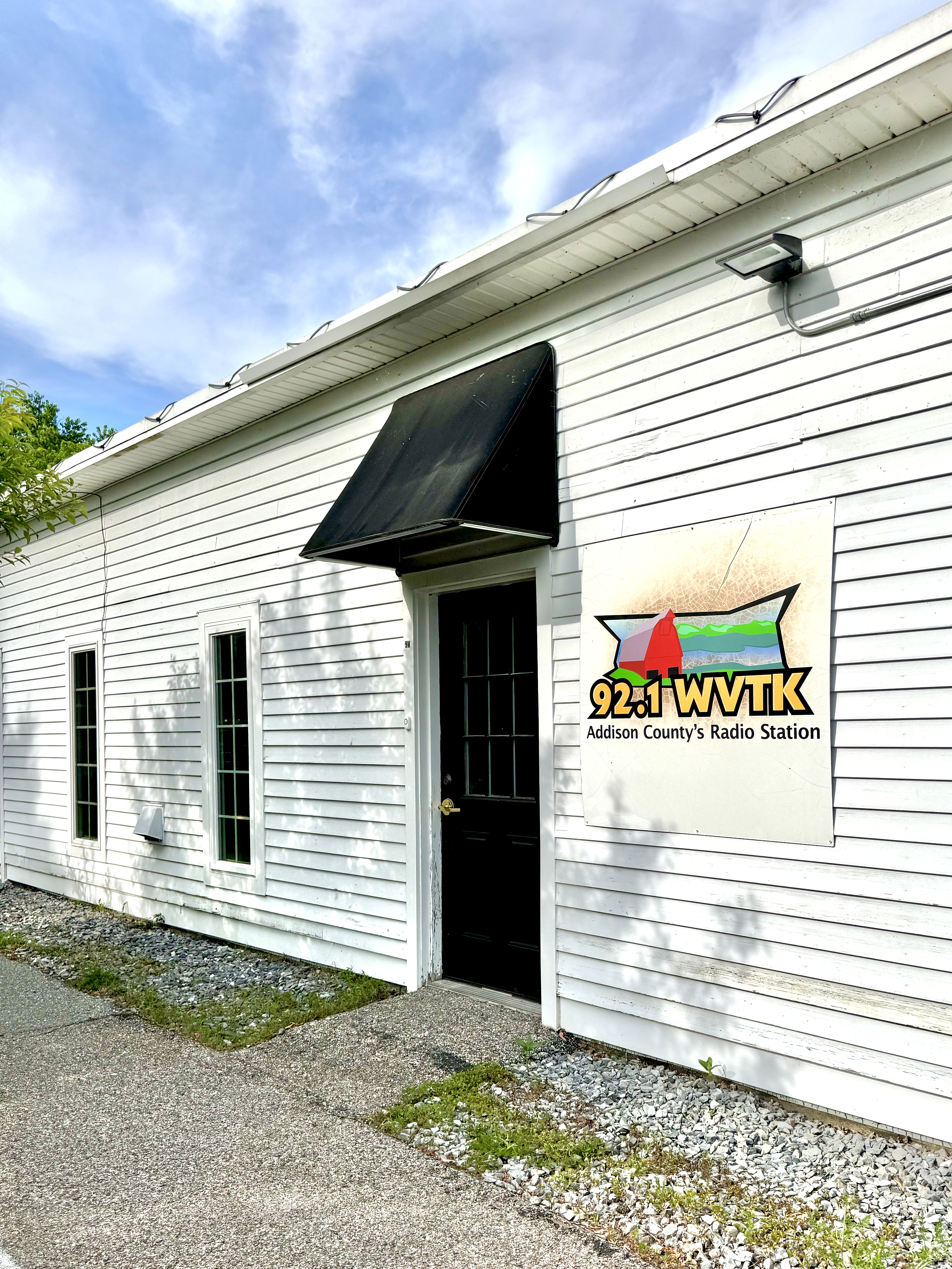
- WVTK's office in Middlebury, Vermont
- Port Henry, New York; United States
- Broadcast area: Champlain Valley, Vermont; Essex County, New York
- Frequency: 92.1 MHz
- Branding: 92.1 WVTK

Programming
- Format: Classic hits
- Affiliations: ABC News Radio

Ownership
- Owner: Vox AM/FM, LLC
- Sister stations: WCPV; WXZO; WEAV; WEZF; WVMT; WXXX

History
- First air date: 1982 (as WHRC-FM)
- Former call signs: WHRC-FM (1982–1985); WKLZ (1985–1988); WHWB-FM (1988–1989); WMNM (1989–1998); WXNT (1998–1999); WLCQ (1999–2001); WJVT (2001–2003)
- Call sign meaning: "Vermont's Kiss" (previous format)

Technical information
- Licensing authority: FCC
- Facility ID: 53613
- Class: C3
- ERP: 18,000 watts
- HAAT: 3 meters (9.8 ft)
- Transmitter coordinates: 44.027°N 73.481°W

Links
- Public license information: Public file; LMS
- Webcast: Listen live
- Website: www.921wvtk.com

WVTK (92.1 MHz) is an FM radio station airing a classic hits radio format, licensed to Port Henry, New York, near the New York State/Vermont border. It is owned by Vox AM/FM, LLC.

WVTK has an effective radiated power of 18,000 watts, most of which radiates into the Champlain Valley. The signal can be heard clearly in Middlebury, Bristol, Brandon, Vergennes and Charlotte, Vermont, along with Port Henry, Ticonderoga and Essex, New York. WVTK's business offices and broadcast studios are located in the Historic Marble Works Complex in Middlebury. The broadcast tower is located off Edgemont Road in Port Henry.

The station positions itself as "Addison County's Radio Station". WVTK serves as the voice of the Middlebury College Panthers hockey and football teams, as well providing coverage for local area high school football, hockey, and basketball coverage.

== History ==
On September 15, 1982, the station first signed on as WHRC-FM. It was owned by Peter Edward Hunn and broadcast a soft adult contemporary format from studios and offices on Joiner Road in Port Henry.

WVTK has been through many format and ownership changes during its decades on the air. The station was once oldies for several years under the call sign of WMNM as "Oldies 92". It returned to oldies once again under the call sign of WLCQ ("Q92"). On May 1, 2007, an oldies format based on the 1960s, early 1970s, and late 1950s returned to 92.1 as "The True Oldies Channel", a syndicated radio service from ABC Radio Networks. The format change lasted for only about 16 months, as the new owners, the Vox Radio Group, flipped the station in early September 2008 to an adult contemporary music (AC) format, with an emphasis on serving Addison County, Vermont. The station switched to classic hits in the summer of 2014 and has stayed with that format.

Throughout the years, the station has had numerous call signs including WHRC-FM, WKLZ, WHWB-FM, WMNM, WXNT, WLCQ and WJVT. The WHWB-FM and WKLZ call signs were also used in Rutland on the 94.5 frequency prior to going dark in 1993 before the 94.5 frequency was reborn as WJEN "Cat Country". The WHWB-FM call sign was originally used on 98.1 FM in Rutland.

WVTK's current air staff includes, Ted Richards and "The Wake-Up Crew," mid-day host J.J. Thompson, and PM Drive host, Jamie Dennis while Hall of Famer Ken Gilbert is on weeknights 7p-12M.Hobbes."

The 92.1 frequency started out as a 3,000-watt facility, and was upgraded to the current 18,000 watts with additional height being added to the Port Henry tower in the early 1990s. Formats on the 92.1 frequency have included: religion, country, CHR (from 2003-2008 as "92-1 Kiss FM"), adult contemporary, rock, smooth jazz (twice), and once as a part-time simulcast of news/talk 1380 WSYB in Rutland. WVTK has also held an oldies format at three different times in its history.

Clear Channel Communications (now iHeartMedia) sold its Champlain Valley radio stations to Vox Communications Group on July 25, 2008. Ken and Lori Barlow bought the station for $550,000 in 2009; Ken Barlow is one of Vox's principals. Effective August 8, 2018, Vox reacquired WVTK for $660,000.
