= Bradford Journal Opinion =

Journal Opinion
- Type: Weekly newspaper
- Format: Broadsheet
- Publisher: Michelle Sherburne
- Editor: Alex Nuti-de Biasi
- Founded: 1865
- Headquarters: Bradford, Vermont
- Circulation: 2,500
- ISSN: 0746-1674
- OCLC number: 7503088
- Website: jonews.com

The Journal Opinion is a weekly newspaper based in Bradford in the U.S. state of Vermont. It was formed in 1978 through the unification of the Journal of Woodsville, New Hampshire and the United Opinion of Bradford by Robert "Bob" Powell who owned both papers. The Bradford Journal-Opinion is published weekly on Wednesdays and it covers the areas of Orange County, Vermont and Grafton County, New Hampshire. In 2022, the paper had a print circulation of 2,500, and had 550 paying customers for its digital edition.

== History ==
The history of the Vermont-based part of the paper can be traced back to 1865, when Araunah A. Earle started a paper called National Opinion in Bradford. Within a year, Earle had sold the paper to David W. Cobb, who ran the paper until 1874. In 1874, Ben Stanton was hired as the publisher and editor, and Stanton changed the paper's name to Bradford Opinion. Between 1879 and 1881, disputes and financial troubles led to the publication of two competing versions of the weekly paper, one called Bradford Opinion (published by the Orange County Publishing Company) and the other called Stanton's Bradford Opinion. In 1881, Henry E. Parker bought both papers and united them under the name United Opinion and began publishing the paper daily.

The paper changed ownership and leadership several times between 1884 and 1947. In December 1947, a fire started in the building where the paper was printed. The fire spread rapidly across several town buildings, destroying the paper’s building and several commercial buildings. After the fire, the United Opinion was printed in conjunction with the White River Valley Herald until 1970, when it was sold and consolidated with the North Country Journal. During the next eight years, the paper was printed under three titles, the North Country Journal Opinion, the Journal-opinion, and the United Opinion. The publishers eventually renamed the paper Journal-Opinion.

In 2007, a reporter for the Bradford Journal-Opinion was at the center of a Vermont Supreme Court case relating to journalists' First Amendment rights. The reporter, Hank Buermeyer, had reported on a select board meeting during which the board members chose a new road foreman for the town of Topsham. The unsuccessful candidate, James Spooner, sued the town for age discrimination based on Buermeyer’s reports that the select board chose the other candidate because he was younger and could serve the town longer. As part of the suit, Spooner tried to compel Buermeyer to testify about what he heard during the meeting; Buermeyer and the Bradford Journal-Opinion declined the request saying that the reporter had qualified privilege unless the plaintiff could prove that he could not get similar testimony from others who witnessed the event. Vermont’s five-member Supreme Court ruled in favor of Spooner, citing the 1972 U.S. Supreme Court case Branzburg v. Hayes.

In October 2022, employee Michelle Sherburne and her husband Rodney purchased the paper from Connie Sanville.
