= Williston Observer =

- Type: Weekly newspaper
- Owner: Chittenden County Suburban Newspapers
- Publisher: Marianne Apfelbaum
- Editor: Jason Starr
- Founded: 1985
- Headquarters: Chittenden County, Vermont, United States
- Circulation: 5,000
- OCLC number: 52809848
- Website: willistonobserver.com

Williston Observer is a weekly newspaper based in Williston, Vermont covering Willston and surrounding communities in Chittenden County. The newspaper is published every Thursday and the circulation is estimated to be around 5,000. This paper is owned by Chittenden County Suburban Newspapers.

The publisher is Marianne Apfelbaum and the editor is Jason Starr

== History ==
The paper was founded as Williston Whistle in 1985 by five local women, Louise Ransom, Elaine Park, Ruth Painter, Diane Goodrich, and Sally Bryant. Louise Ransom, who wrote a book compiling articles and editorials from the early days of the paper, A Town in Transition: Tales Told in Newsprint, stayed with the paper as owner and editor for 10 years. Ransom and Bryant eventually bought out the other owners. Ransom also helped the paper to move into a new building, which it shared with the Williston Community Coffee House.

In the early 90s, the paper was caught in the middle of disagreements in the Williston community about the development of a large shopping complex.

Ransom and Bryant sold the paper to Marianne and Paul Apfelbaum in 1994. The Apfelbaums, who already owned the Vermont Maturity magazine, had been looking to buy another paper and learned that the paper was for sale when they went to put an ad in the paper.

The paper was renamed Williston Observer in 2003.

Print and microfilm copies of the Whistle/Observer are kept in the Dorothy Alling Memorial Library in Williston.
