= Vermont Student Assistance Corporation =

- Founded: 1965
- Type: public, nonprofit agency
- Location: Winooski, Vermont
- Region served: Vermont
- Product: Career and education counseling, financial aid planning, grants, scholarships, education loans and Vermont’s 529 college savings program
- Key people: Scott A. Giles, President & CEO; Michael R. Stuart, Vice President & CFO; Thomas A. Little, Vice President & General Counsel; Marilyn J. Cargill, Vice President, Financial Aid, Marketing and Research; Patrick J. Leduc, CIO & Vice President of Career and Education Outreach
- Employees: 160
- Website: www.vsac.org

Vermont Student Assistance Corporation is a public, nonprofit agency established by Governor Phil Hoff and the Vermont Legislature in 1965 to help Vermonters achieve their education and training goals after high school. VSAC serves students and their families in grades 7-12, as well as adults returning to school, by providing education and career planning services, need-based grants, scholarships and education loans. VSAC has awarded more than $680 million in grants and scholarships for Vermont students, and also administers Vermont’s 529 college savings plan.

VSAC employs 160+ people and is governed by an 11-member Board of Directors. Five of the members are appointed by the Governor, two are legislative members, one is the State Treasurer, and the remaining three are chosen by the Board itself.
