= Franklin County Courier =

Weekly newspaper in Vermont, US

- Type: Weekly newspaper
- Format: Broadsheet
- Owner: Greg Lemoreaux
- Editor: Greg Lemoreaux
- Founded: 1977
- Headquarters: Enosburg Falls, Vermont
- Circulation: 4,100 est.
- Website: countycourier.net

The Franklin County Courier is a weekly newspaper in Enosburg Falls, Vermont, which is released on Thursdays. It is more often referred to as the County Courier. The County Courier, which has an estimated circulation of 4,100, serves Franklin County as well as the communities of Alburgh, Jeffersonville, Waterville, and Belvidere, Vermont.

The current editor of the County Courier is Greg Lemoreaux. The paper is currently published by O'Shea Publishing Co., though the business status is listed as inactive by the Vermont Secretary of State.

== History ==
=== Origins and Ownership ===
In 1977, the County Courier was formed from the merger of Enosburg Standard, Richford Journal and Gazette, Swanton Courier, and the Saint Albans Leader by then owner of the Swanton Courier and Saint Albans Leader, Bernard O'Shea. Prior to the merger this group of weekly newspapers was edited by Nat Worman. The paper was sold to Mathias and Alison Dubilier in 1992. Owner Mathias Dubilier gave the editor position to the paper's primary reporter Steve Cusick in 1997. In 2008, Alison Dubilier sold the paper to Ed Shamy, a former columnist for The Burlington Free Press.

=== Political Connections ===
Owner and publisher of the paper from 1977 to 1992, Bernard O'Shea, was active in politics throughout his life. He made several attempts at running for Vermont Senate and House seats as well as Governor, winning several primary elections but never successfully winning a general election. He held several appointments including on the State Board of Education, and was active in the peace movement.

=== 2006 Hacking ===
In August 2006 the website of the County Courier was hacked and the newspaper's web content was replaced with graphic images of bombing victims.
