= Milton Independent =

Weekly newspaper in Vermont, US

- Type: Weekly newspaper
- Format: digital
- Publisher: O'Rourke Media Group
- Founded: 1993
- Headquarters: 281 North Main Street, St. Albans, Vermont, United States
- OCLC number: 28874484
- Website: miltonindependent.com

The Milton Independent is a free weekly newspaper that is a part of O'Rourke Media Group. It covers news in the town of Milton in Chittenden County, Vermont, United States.

== History ==
The Independent was founded in 1993 by Lynn Delaney after she left Milton Matters along with 16 others in December 1992, when the Milton town leadership expressed a desire to review articles before they were published. She had been contacted by Emerson Lynn about starting a new publication, and put out the first edition of the paper on February 18, 1993. Delaney remained as editor of the Independent until her retirement in 2010.

In January 2021, the paper ceased its weekly print publication and moved to only publish online. In August 2024, the newspaper announced it will resume print, this time monthly.

== Circulation ==
The Milton Independent started with a circulation of around 4,200, which had increased to 6,300 by 2018.
