= WEZF =

- Burlington, Vermont; United States
- Broadcast area: Vermont, Northern New York, Greater Montreal
- Frequency: 92.9 MHz
- Branding: Star 92.9

Programming
- Format: Adult contemporary
- Affiliations: Premiere Networks

Ownership
- Owner: Vox AM/FM, LLC
- Sister stations: WCPV; WEAV; WXZO; WVTK

History
- First air date: July 19, 1969
- Former call signs: WVNY (1969–1973)
- Call sign meaning: "EZ Favorites" (previous format)

Technical information
- Licensing authority: FCC
- Facility ID: 35232
- Class: C
- ERP: 46,000 watts
- HAAT: 828 meters (2,717 ft)
- Transmitter coordinates: 44°31′32.1″N 72°48′56.4″W

Links
- Public license information: Public file; LMS
- Webcast: Listen live
- Website: www.star929.com

WEZF (92.9 FM, "Star 92.9") is a commercial radio station located in Burlington, Vermont, United States. Owned by Vox AM/FM, it features an adult contemporary format, with studios on Hegeman Avenue in Colchester and its transmitter sited on top of Mount Mansfield, the highest mountaintop in Vermont.

WEZF's signal allows it to serve a large area, including much of Vermont, the Adirondacks and North Country of New York, northwestern New Hampshire and much of southern Quebec (including Greater Montreal and Sherbrooke).

== History ==
=== Early years: beautiful music and soft adult contemporary (1969–1999) ===
On July 19, 1969, WEZF first signed on as WVNY, owned by Vermont New York Broadcasting, Inc. The call sign was shared with WVNY-TV (channel 22), which signed on a year before its FM counterpart. WVNY was unusual in that it was originally launched as an offshoot of a TV station and never had a companion AM station. This situation made it the first FM station in Vermont without an AM counterpart.

WVNY originally had a beautiful music format, playing sets of soft instrumental music with limited disc jockey patter. In 1973, to reflect the FM station's easy listening format, the call sign was changed to WEZF; the television station would itself become WEZF-TV a year later. In 1982, the two stations were sold to Champlain Communications Corporation. The TV station returned to its original WVNY call sign, while the FM station moved to a soft adult contemporary sound as "93 WEZF". In 1995, the station switched to a mainstream AC format and rebranded as "92.9 WEZF".

WEZF still broadcasts from historic Fort Ethan Allen in Colchester, Vermont, where it had been co-located with WVNY-TV. (WVNY, which is now owned by Mission Broadcasting and operated by Nexstar Media Group, moved to other studios in Colchester.)

=== The Clear Channel era (1999–2008) ===
In 1999, the station turned up the tempo again, now as a hot AC outlet, and was rebranded as "Star 92.9". In August 2000, WEZF was acquired by Clear Channel Communications, the forerunner to today's iHeartMedia, Inc. By 2003, the station reverted to adult contemporary after previous AC station WLKC flipped formats. In addition, Christmas music began airing on the station from mid-November to December 25, a tradition that has remained.

=== Vox takeover (2008–2010) ===
In 2007, Clear Channel, America's largest owner of radio stations, announced it would sell off hundreds of its stations in smaller markets. WEZF, along with sister stations WCPV, WXZO, WEAV, WVTK, WXZO, WCVR-FM, and WTSJ, were all involved in a sale to locally owned Vox Communications. One of the current principal owners in Vox Communications originally launched both WCPV in late 1994, and after that the radio station now known as WXZO. In July 2008, Vox Communications took control of WEZF and its sister stations.

=== Moving towards a hot adult contemporary direction (2010–2012) ===
By September 2010, a few months after its classic hits-formatted Feel Good Flashback Weekend show was dropped and as sister station WXZO become Top 40 "Planet 96.7", WEZF moved back to hot AC. Management explained the Feel Good Flashback Weekend show was discontinued due to rival WWMP returning to adult hits while Star 92.9 moved to a younger sound.

By September 2011, WEZF was moved to the Nielsen BDS hot adult contemporary panel, but the station was still listed as adult contemporary by Mediabase reports.

In late 2011, WEZF began pursuing listeners and advertisers in the Montreal radio market, taking advantage of 92.5 CFQR-FM's change in format, becoming rhythmic AC CKBE-FM, "92-5 The Beat". That left Montreal without an English-language AC station, a void that WEZF wanted to fill. Martz Communications Group, which handles advertising sales for WEZF, orchestrated the effort.

=== Return to hot adult contemporary (2012–present) ===
The hosts of the morning show changed in late 2011. As of March 2012, WEZF was switched to the hot adult contemporary panel per Mediabase reports, its second run in the hot AC format. More than a week after the station flipped formats to hot AC, the station made schedule readjustments, moving Tara to drive time, while bringing a new short-lived morning show with hosts Tim & Mary. Tim was soon replaced by market veteran Mike Czarny who had a 16-year run as morning show host at 95 Triple X. He was paired with Mary Cenci for "Mike and Mary in the Morning" which is still airing today and is #1 in the market. Mike's former morning show partner, Chantal, also joined Star 92.9 for afternoons. Star 92.9 continues its A/C format along with switching to Christmas music each November through midnight on Christmas Day.
