= WVNY =

Television station in Burlington, Vermont

- Burlington, Vermont; Plattsburgh, New York; United States
- City: Burlington, Vermont
- Channels: Digital: 7 (VHF); Virtual: 22
- Branding: ABC22

Programming
- Affiliations: 22.1: ABC; for others, see § Subchannels

Ownership
- Owner: Mission Broadcasting, Inc.
- Operator: Nexstar Media Group
- Sister stations: WFFF-TV

History
- First air date: August 19, 1968
- Former call signs: WVNY-TV (1968–1974); WEZF-TV (1974–1982)
- Former channel numbers: Analog: 22 (UHF, 1968–2009); Digital: 13 (VHF, 2006–2020)
- Call sign meaning: Vermont and New York

Technical information
- Licensing authority: FCC
- Facility ID: 11259
- ERP: 14 kW
- HAAT: 831 m (2,726 ft)
- Transmitter coordinates: 44°31′33″N 72°48′55″W

Links
- Public license information: Public file; LMS
- Website: www.mychamplainvalley.com

WVNY (channel 22) is a television station licensed to Burlington, Vermont, United States, serving the Burlington, Vermont–Plattsburgh, New York market as an affiliate of ABC. It is owned by Mission Broadcasting and operated by Nexstar Media Group alongside Fox affiliate WFFF-TV (channel 44). The two stations share studios in Colchester, Vermont; WVNY's transmitter is located on Mount Mansfield.

WVNY began broadcasting on August 19, 1968, as the third commercial station in the region. It was built by Vermont New York Television and operated from studios in the former officer's club at Fort Ethan Allen. While it failed to make much of an impression in the area of news, it broadcast local and regional sports. Financing difficulties left the station off the air for five months in mid-1971. International Television Corporation assumed control of the station in 1971 and bought it outright in 1974. Under its control, channel 22 made two further, low-rated attempts at local news programming and moved into the former WCAX studios in Burlington. Between 1974 and 1982, the station was WEZF-TV, matching co-owned radio station WEZF. In 1982, it became the first broadcast property of Citadel Communications. WVNY continued to emphasize sports programming, which included Boston Red Sox baseball and—at one point—an affiliation with the Canadian Football Network, owing to its widespread availability on cable in Montreal across the Canadian border.

After Straightline Communications acquired the station in 1998, the news department was retooled and relaunched in August 1999. Despite being seen as the station's most credible local news offering to date, the newscasts were discontinued in 2003 due to continued low ratings. Lambert Broadcasting bought WVNY in 2005 in partnership with Smith Media, owner of WFFF-TV; the station moved to Colchester. Local news returned after WFFF-TV began a local news department in 2007. Mission acquired WVNY in 2013 after Nexstar purchased WFFF. The WVNY–WFFF news department produces 35 hours of local news programming a week, just over half of it for air on channel 22.

== Early years ==
On November 12, 1966, Vermont New York Television applied to the Federal Communications Commission (FCC) for a construction permit to build a new television station on channel 22 in Burlington, Vermont. The application, proposing a transmitter site atop Mount Mansfield, foresaw a station to provide full ABC affiliation in the region. Over an objection filed by Vermont's existing commercial TV station, WCAX-TV, the FCC granted the permit on February 15, 1967. The news was well-received by one particular Vermonter: governor Philip H. Hoff, who commented that it was "one of the greatest pieces of news the people of the State of Vermont have ever received"; WCAX-TV's owner was known to be a bitter opponent of Hoff's policies. Though the company was unable to start up in 1967 due to delays in procuring necessary equipment, it selected a studio site in the former Fort Ethan Allen, which was also home to Vermont Educational Television. The station leased the former officer's club on the base and expanded it with a studio.

WVNY-TV began broadcasting August 19, 1968. Local programming at launch included 6 and 11 p.m. newscasts, a local children's show, and sports telecasts, including the first-ever telecast of Vermont Catamounts home athletic events. In 1969, it aired the Canadian Broadcasting Corporation (CBC)'s coverage of Montreal Expos baseball. The station was also known for its all-night movie telecasts, which prompted interest from cable operators in Quebec and Cornwall, Ontario, in adding the station to their lineups. In July 1969, an FM radio station, WVNY-FM 92.9, launched; its call sign was changed in October 1973 to WEZF.

In its early years, WVNY-TV suffered from financial difficulties in a tight credit market. The station cut back its broadcast day in January 1970, ending a 24-hour broadcast day and consigning the all-night movies to Saturday nights only. Between June and August 1970, the station was signing on six days a week at 6 p.m. and Saturdays at 5 p.m. Between the two cutbacks, 11 employees lost their jobs. The 6 p.m. local newscast was discontinued in September, leaving an 11 p.m. newscast four nights a week and the children's show as its only local studio programs. On April 2, 1971, at 1 a.m., WVNY-TV went off the air temporarily. While channel 22 was off the air, Vermont New York Television negotiated to sell it. The station was back on the air September 17, after more than five months out of service, under the operational control of the International Television Corporation (ITC), though ITC did not file to have the license transferred to it until October 1973 and was not the approved licensee until April 1974.

In 1972, the station joined the Boston Bruins hockey television network. When it attempted to renew for the 1973–1974 season, it was met with strong opposition from the Montreal Canadiens, who feared that WVNY's signal in the direction of Montreal was hurting their attendance. Station management and analysts in Montreal disagreed on the availability and signal strength of WVNY in the Montreal area. The Canadiens' decision spurred a letter-writing campaign, including a caravan of local residents that planned to travel to the Canadian border to present a petition, but the team reversed its stance. In 1976, the Canadiens ordered WVNY not to air several Bruins playoff games because they conflicted with Montreal home games to which there were unsold tickets.

ITC closed on the purchase of WVNY-TV and WEZF in July 1974. On September 3, WVNY-TV became WEZF-TV. After several years of not airing local newscasts, WEZF-TV debuted a new local news department in 1975, which was discontinued the next year. The news staff consisted of one person, and the newscasts were largely "rip-and-read", with the station instead emphasizing sports coverage and entertainment. It tried again in 1979, when it launched a half-hour news and features newscast titled First News 5:30. The 1979 reintroduction of news came after scrutiny from the FCC during channel 22's 1978 license renewal as to whether the station was meeting its five-percent local programming quota. The station relocated from Fort Ethan Allen to the former WCAX studios in Burlington's Market Square in 1980. The next year, the 5:30 news was retooled and moved to 6 p.m., where it would compete against WCAX and WPTZ, under the new title News Center 22. However, the newscast lacked sufficient resources and continued to rely heavily on features, and it was a very distant third-place to WCAX and WPTZ.

John R. Hughes, a former vice president of WEZF-TV who had attempted to buy the station, resigned in 1981 and filed a license challenge, including a competing application for channel 22. Hughes promised increased news coverage and local children's and talk shows. ITC president Donald Martin bought Hughes's stake out in March 1982 as the license challenge was settled.

== Citadel ownership ==
Philip J. Lombardo agreed in August 1982 to acquire WEZF-TV from International Television Corporation for $4.5 million (equivalent to $12.7 million in 2025). Lombardo stepped down as the president of Corinthian Broadcasting to pursue a career in station ownership and hoped to buy additional stations. After taking control in November, Lombardo made major changes. Separated from WEZF radio, the station reverted to its original WVNY call sign; though all part-time employees were laid off, Lombardo promised an 11 p.m. newscast, new cameras, and electronic news gathering equipment to enable reporters to cover events in the field. Lombardo initiated further belt-tightening, dropping out of the Boston Red Sox television network and reducing its involvement in filming re-enactments for the local Crimestoppers. The 11 p.m. newscast was added in mid-1983. By 1984, when he acquired WUTV in Buffalo, New York, Lombardo's ownership group was known as Citadel Communications.

In 1987, WVNY carried 15 Friday night telecasts from the Canadian Football Network (CFN). The network, which consisted otherwise of Canadian independent stations, had no other outlet available to reach Montreal as all stations there passed on the package; though WVNY could not carry the entire 37-game network schedule due to commitments to ABC weekend sports programming, station management thought the Canadian football was good counterprogramming to Friday-night reruns, and the Montreal Alouettes were among the last teams in the Canadian Football League to not have a secured CFN outlet in their market. By this time, 70 percent of Montreal homes had cable and could see the station, plus additional viewers who received it over the air. Channel 22 planned to air live games through the summer and delayed broadcasts once the fall TV season started. The Alouettes folded in late June, days before the CFL season began. WVNY rejoined the Red Sox TV network for 1988.

WVNY was a comparatively heavy preempter of ABC network programming in the late 1980s and early 1990s. It occasionally found that it would make more money programming reruns in which it could sell its own commercials than from network compensation to air selected ABC programs, such as Step by Step and The Commish. Months into the 1991–1992 television season, in part to repair relations with ABC, the station relented and dropped its preemptions of those shows and the ABC Sunday Night Movie. Two years later, when ABC moved Nightline from an 11:30 to an 11:35 p.m. start, WVNY balked; not wanting to extend its local news by five minutes just for a poorly-rated show, it dropped the program altogether in favor of reruns of Married... with Children. This lasted six months and ended when ABC gave affiliates additional prime time commercials to sell if they aired Nightline. For years until 1996, the station did not air General Hospital, replacing it with children's shows. From January to August 1995, it aired Star Trek: Voyager, as the market had no UPN affiliate.

== Straightline ownership and 1999 news relaunch ==
In 1995, Citadel sold WVNY to U.S. Broadcast Group of Wakefield, Rhode Island, which was formed to buy mid-market TV and radio stations. The company, which owned seven stations, put itself up for sale in early 1997 after New Vision Television, which had a small interest in the firm, opted to stop managing the U.S. Broadcast Group stations. The next year, Straightline Communications of Greenwich, Connecticut, purchased WVNY for $26 million (equivalent to $247 million in 2025). The firm owned two other stations, both of which it leased back to Paramount Stations Group.

After the purchase, four members of the WVNY news team—including the morning anchor, lead anchor, chief meteorologist, and sports director—departed. At the time, the news department aired a full evening newscast at 6 p.m. and a five-minute news summary at 11 p.m. Straightline reduced the 6 p.m. news to five minutes while it set out to overhaul the news operation. This included replacing the VHS cameras the station had used with new digital cameras, building a new news set, and buying new weather forecasting equipment. The revamped ABC22 News debuted with 6 and 11 p.m. reports on August 9, 1999, and was seen by station staff and outside observers as the most credible attempt at news in WVNY's history. However, ratings remained very low. In 2002, the station hired former Republican gubernatorial candidate Ruth Dwyer as an investigative reporter in an attempt to increase interest in its newscasts.

After failing to attract more than a single-digit percentage of the viewing audience against the established news operations of WCAX and WPTZ, Straightline shut down the WVNY newsroom effective September 12, 2003, and laid off its 25-person operation. News director Peter Speciale led an effort to find further employment for many of the employees in the news department; every employee's résumé was posted on the website, the newsroom was kept open to allow employees to job hunt, and the station provided tapes for laid-off staffers to send out for free. Half the news staff found jobs within two months. Writing for Seven Days, Peter Freyne faulted the news product for being "a cookie-cutter version of what local news is around the country. It could have been Topeka or Toledo or Fort Myers, Florida—only the local place names were different."

When ABC launched Jimmy Kimmel Live!, an hour-long show, in 2003, WVNY only aired the first half of the program. This was because it replaced Politically Incorrect with Bill Maher, a half-hour-long program, and the station had already sold the second half-hour to telecast infomercials.

== Common operation with WFFF-TV ==
In February 2005, Lambert Broadcasting filed to buy WVNY from Straightline Communications. In a concurrent and related transaction, Smith Media—owner of Burlington's Fox affiliate, WFFF-TV (channel 44)—agreed to buy the station's non-license assets. The $1.3 million (equivalent to $2.06 million in 2025) license purchase and $8.9 million (equivalent to $14.1 million in 2025) acquisition of all other assets was approved by the FCC and closed in May. New ownership prepared to move WVNY's operations into WFFF's Colchester facility, and WVNY had vacated its studios by 2007.

WFFF-TV launched a news department and 10 p.m. newscast in December 2007.

Lambert Broadcasting agreed to sell WVNY to Mission Broadcasting on November 5, 2012. Concurrently, Smith Media sold WFFF-TV to Nexstar Broadcasting Group, which operates all of Mission's stations through shared services agreements. After receiving FCC approval, the $16.9 million (equivalent to $23.4 million in 2025) transaction closed in March 2013. Nexstar invested in the news operation, and for a time the stations were renamed Local 22 and Local 44. Despite this, the news department—which had been extended to WVNY—continued to find low ratings. In February 2015, at 6 p.m., WCAX commanded a 15.3 rating, WPTZ a 12.3 rating, and WVNY a 0.5.

As of 2024, WVNY aired 19 1/2 hours a week of local news, including weekday morning, 6, 7, and 11 p.m. newscasts, as well as a weekly public affairs program, What Matters This Week. In addition, WFFF aired a two-hour morning news extension at 7 a.m. and a 10 p.m. newscast (an hour on weeknights, 30 minutes on weekends) for a total of 16 hours of news.

== Notable former on-air staff ==
- Andrew Catalon – sports director, 2001–2003
- Jim Donovan – sportscaster, 1981
- Barrie Dunsmore – weekly commentator, 2002
- Bob Lobel – sports director, 1969
- John Moynihan – sports director and newscaster, 1969–1970
- Tabitha Soren – Statehouse reporter and 11 p.m. anchor, 1989–1990

== Technical information ==
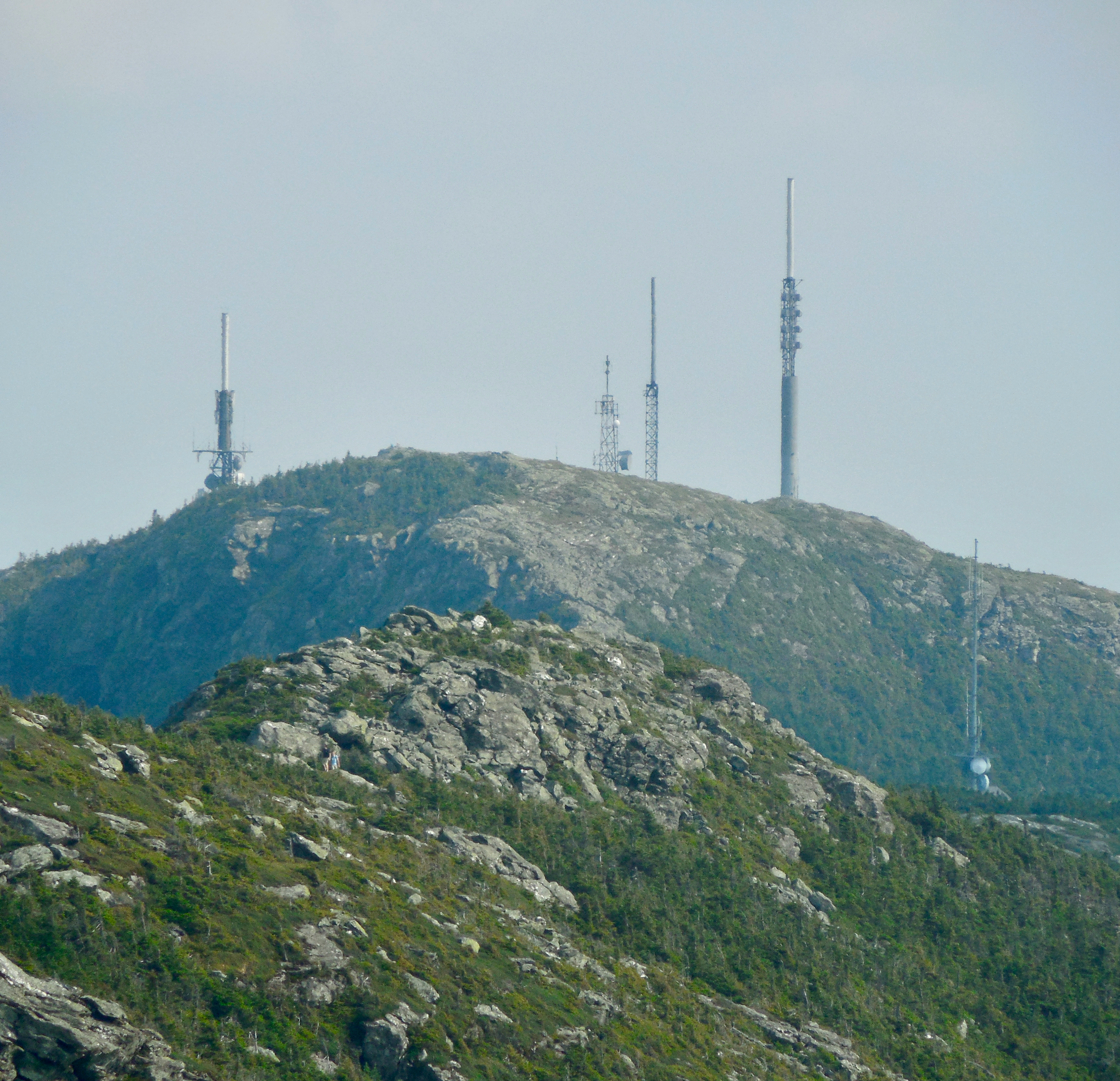
Mount Mansfield, from where WVNY's signal is broadcast

=== Subchannels ===
WVNY is broadcast from Mount Mansfield. Its signal is multiplexed:

Subchannels of WVNY
Subchannel	Res.	Short name	Programming
22.1	720p	WVNY-DT	ABC
22.2	480i	Laff	Laff
22.3	480i	Grit	Grit
22.4	480i	Quest	Quest

=== Analog-to-digital conversion ===
WVNY began digital broadcasts in 2006. This relatively late startup was due to the work necessary to replace all of the towers on Mount Mansfield—used at the time by WCAX, Vermont ETV, and WVNY—in preparation for digital conversion. WVNY shut down its analog signal, over UHF channel 22, on February 17, 2009, the original digital transition date. Most Vermont stations opted not to wait four months until the new shutdown date of June. The station's digital signal remained on its pre-transition VHF channel 13, using virtual channel 22. As a part of the repacking process following the 2016–2017 FCC incentive auction, WVNY relocated to VHF channel 7 on July 3, 2020.
