= List of storms named Irene =

The name Irene has been used for twelve tropical cyclones worldwide. Seven in the Atlantic, two in the South and Western Pacific, and one on the South-West Indian Ocean and Australian region basins. It has also been used for two European windstorms.

In the Atlantic:

- Tropical Storm Irene (1953) – off-season tropical storm which never made landfall
- Tropical Storm Irene (1959) – minimal tropical storm that came ashore in Florida
- Hurricane Irene (1971) – struck Nicaragua as a Category 1 hurricane which passed into the Pacific and was renamed Olivia
- Hurricane Irene (1981) – strong Category 3 hurricane that struck land only as an extratropical cyclone.
- Hurricane Irene (1999) – strong Category 2 hurricane that affected landmasses stretching from Central America up through Newfoundland.
- Hurricane Irene (2005) – long-lived Cape Verde hurricane that never struck land.
- Hurricane Irene (2011) – large and powerful Category 3 hurricane that struck the Greater Antilles, the Bahamas, and United States, causing extensive damages totaling US$14.2 billion.

The name Irene was retired in the North Atlantic after the 2011 season, and was replaced by Irma for the 2017 season.

In the Western Pacific:

- Tropical Storm Irene (1947) – formed in the Philippines

In the South Pacific:

- Cyclone Irene (1969)
- Cyclone Irene (2023) – affected Vanuatu and New Caledonia

In the Australian region:

- Cyclone Irene (1977) – skirted the northern coast of Western Australia, but ultimately affected no land areas

In the South-West Indian Ocean:

- Moderate Tropical Storm Irene (1963) – struck Madagascar shortly before dissipating

In Europe:

- Storm Irene (2018) – affected the Azores
- Storm Irene (2024) – Western Europe
