= Colchester, Vermont =

- Town
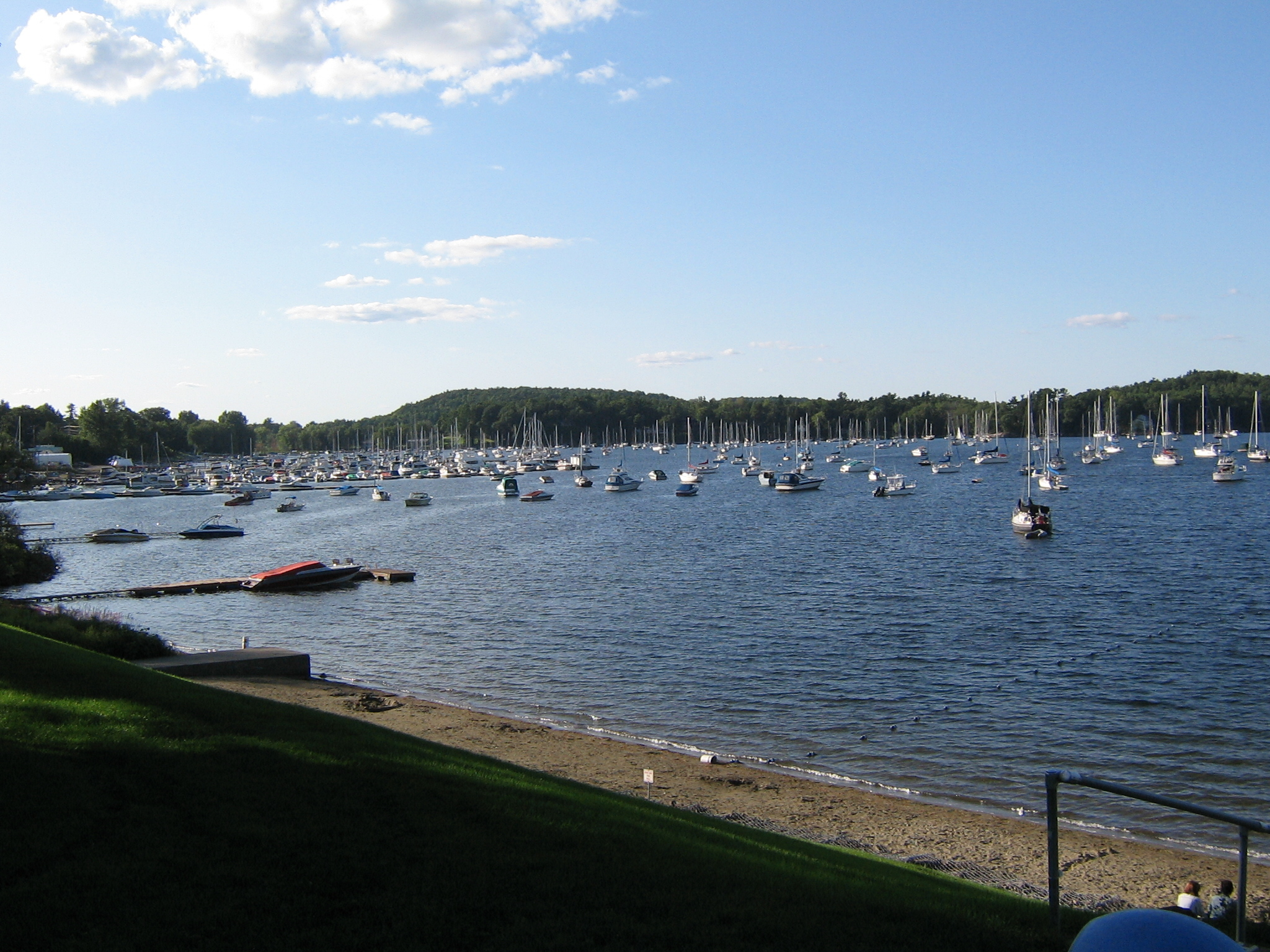
- View of Malletts Bay (part of Lake Champlain) from Bayside Park near the center of Colchester

- Seal Logo

- Location in Chittenden County and the state of Vermont
- Coordinates: 44°33′22″N 73°13′10″W
- Country: United States
- State: Vermont
- County: Chittenden
- Communities: Colchester; Malletts Bay; Walnut Ledge

Area
  - Total: 58.6 sq mi (151.7 km^{2})
  - Land: 36.3 sq mi (94.1 km^{2})
  - Water: 22.2 sq mi (57.6 km^{2})
- Elevation: 98 ft (30 m)

Population (2020)
  - Total: 17,524
  - Density: 482/sq mi (186/km^{2})
- Time zone: UTC-5 (Eastern (EST))
  - Summer (DST): UTC-4 (EDT)
- ZIP codes: 05439, 05446, 05449
- Area code: 802
- FIPS code: 50-14875
- GNIS feature ID: 1462073
- Website: colchestervt.gov

Colchester is a town in Chittenden County, Vermont, United States. As of the 2020 census, the population of Colchester was 17,524. It is the third-most populous municipality and most populous town in the state of Vermont. Colchester borders Burlington, Vermont's most populous municipality and is part of its metropolitan area. The town is directly to Burlington's north on the eastern shore of Lake Champlain, to the west of the Green Mountains. The Vermont National Guard is based in the town, and it is also home to Saint Michael's College and the Vermont campus of Southern New Hampshire University.

== History ==
Chartered June 7, 1763, the town was named for the Earl of Colchester.

Winooski Falls separated from the town of Colchester in 1922, causing Colchester to lose a large percentage of its population to the newly founded city of Winooski.

== Geography ==
Colchester is located on the shore of Malletts Bay, part of Lake Champlain. The westernmost part of the town touches the New York state border in the middle of the lake. To the northwest, across the eastern arm of the lake, lies the town of South Hero in Grand Isle County. Chittenden County communities bordering Colchester are Milton to the northeast, Westford touching the easternmost point of Colchester, Essex to the southeast, and the cities of South Burlington, Winooski, and Burlington to the south.

According to the United States Census Bureau, Colchester has a total area of 58.6 square miles (151.7 km^{2}), of which 36.3 square miles (94.1 km^{2}) is land and 22.2 square miles (57.6 km^{2}), or 38.0%, is water.

== Demographics ==
Historical population
| Census | Pop. | Note | %± |
|---|---|---|---|
| 1790 | 137 | | — |
| 1800 | 347 | | 153.3% |
| 1810 | 657 | | 89.3% |
| 1820 | 960 | | 46.1% |
| 1830 | 1,489 | | 55.1% |
| 1840 | 1,739 | | 16.8% |
| 1850 | 2,575 | | 48.1% |
| 1860 | 3,041 | | 18.1% |
| 1870 | 3,911 | | 28.6% |
| 1880 | 4,421 | | 13.0% |
| 1890 | 5,143 | | 16.3% |
| 1900 | 5,352 | | 4.1% |
| 1910 | 6,450 | | 20.5% |
| 1920 | 6,627 | | 2.7% |
| 1930 | 2,638 | | −60.2% |
| 1940 | 3,031 | | 14.9% |
| 1950 | 3,897 | | 28.6% |
| 1960 | 4,718 | | 21.1% |
| 1970 | 8,776 | | 86.0% |
| 1980 | 12,629 | | 43.9% |
| 1990 | 14,731 | | 16.6% |
| 2000 | 16,986 | | 15.3% |
| 2010 | 17,067 | | 0.5% |
| 2020 | 17,524 | | 2.7% |
U.S. Decennial Census

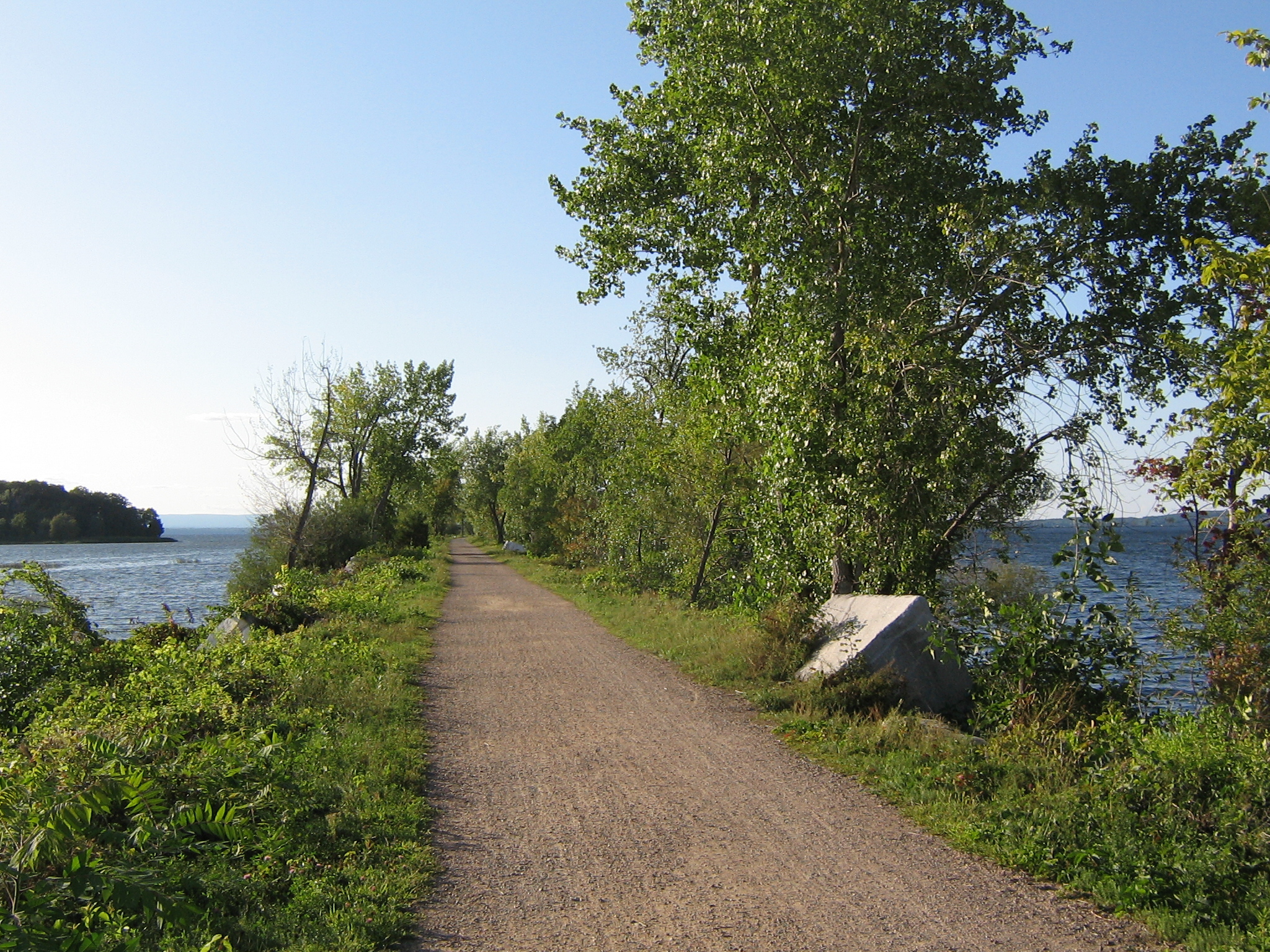
The Island Line Trail travels from Colchester across Lake Champlain to Grand Isle County; it is a former railroad line.

As of the census of 2010, there were 17,067 people, 6,576 households, and 4,184 families residing in the town. The population density was 470 people per square mile. There were 6,727 housing units at an average density of 182.4 per square mile (70.4/km^{2}). The racial makeup of the town was 94.6% White, 1.5% African American, 0.1% Native American, 1.9% Asian, 0.0% Pacific Islander, 0.25% from other races, and 1.8% from two or more races. 1.7% of the population were Hispanic or Latino of any race. 6.1% spoke a language other than English at home.

As of the 2000 census, 34.1% of households had children under the age of 18 living with them, 55.2% were married couples living together, 8.8% had a female householder with no husband present, and 31.9% were non-families. 22.2% of all households were made up of individuals, and 5.0% had someone living alone who was 65 years of age or older. The average household size was 2.50 and the average family size was 2.96.

In the town, the population was spread out, with 22.6% under the age of 18, 16.2% from 18 to 24, 32.1% from 25 to 44, 22.7% from 45 to 64, and 6.4% who were 65 years of age or older. The median age was 33 years. For every 100 females, there were 96.0 males. For every 100 females age 18 and over, there were 95.0 males.

== Economy ==
One measure of economic activity is retail sales. Colchester was fourth in the state in 2007 with $245.8 million. Major employers in the town include the VNA of Chittenden & Grand Isle Counties, Saint Michael's College, Costco Wholesale Corporation, Green Mountain Power, Shaw's Supermarket, and Champlain Cable Corporation.

=== Personal income ===
In 2014, the median household income for Colchester was $68,440; the per capita income was $30,877. Males had a median income of $38,268 versus $30,880 for females. About 5.4% of families, 8.2% of those under age 18, and 9.7% of those age 65 or over (total of 10.6% of the population) were below the poverty line. In 2011, the median home value was $246,269.

=== Tourism ===
There has been an annual "Lake Champlain International Father's Day Fishing Derby" (LCI) since 1981. In 2009, 6,000 fishermen entered.

The lakeshore areas of Colchester get an influx of vacationers every summer from southern New England and the New York City area. Traffic, especially around the Fourth of July holiday, increases by a substantial margin.

Niquette Bay State Park offers hiking and swimming in Lake Champlain.

== Government ==
=== Elected officials ===
In the Vermont state legislature, Colchester residents were represented by Senator Richard Mazza (D) and Representatives Curt Taylor (D), Seth Chase (D), Sarita Austin (D), and Patrick Brennan (R) as of June 2021.

In 2026, Colchester is represented by Senator Patrick Brennan (R) and Representatives Gayle Pezzo (D), Doug Bishop (D), Sarita Austin (D), and Wendy Critchlow in the state legislature.

== Education ==
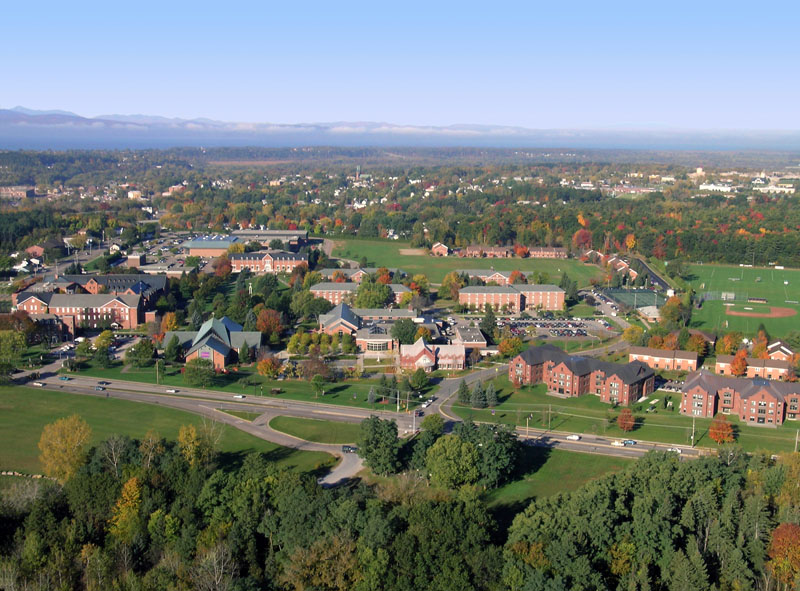
Saint Michael's College

- Saint Michael's College is located here.
- Southern New Hampshire University – Vermont Center, home of the field-based graduate program in education.

=== Public school system ===
Around 2,200 children attend the five schools in Colchester's school district. The district consists of one high school, Colchester High School; one middle school, Colchester Middle School; and three elementary schools: Malletts Bay School, Porters Point School, and Union Memorial School.

== Media ==
=== Radio ===
- WVTX – 88.7 FM
- WVMT – 620 AM
- WXXX "95 Triple X" – 95.5 FM

=== Television ===
- WFFF-TV – "Fox 44"
- WVNY – "ABC 22"

== Infrastructure ==
=== Transportation ===
Interstate 89 passes through the area, with exits 16 and 17 serving Colchester. Exit 16 connects to the concurrency of US Routes 2 and 7 (Roosevelt Highway), just north of Winooski. Exit 17 connects to US 2, which goes west to the Champlain Islands, and also to US 7, which heads north toward the town of Milton.

In the southeastern part of Colchester, and also along the US Route 7 corridor, bus service is provided by Green Mountain Transit.

Vermont Translines provides scheduled bus service to Albany, New York via Burlington, as well as Hanover, New Hampshire and Lebanon, New Hampshire via a transfer at Rutland.

== Notable people ==
- Alfred Elisha Ames, physician and politician
- Tom Brennan, former men's basketball coach at the University of Vermont
- Ray Collins, pitcher with the Boston Red Sox (1909–1915)
- Roger Enos, Major General and commander of the Vermont Militia in the later stages of the American Revolution
- Mat Fraser, CrossFit athlete
- Donato Giancola, science fiction and fantasy illustrator
- Robert Lanou, physicist
- Steven Sonntag, NFL cheerleader
- Richard Tarrant, American businessman and politician
- Lucy Wheelock, founder and first president of Wheelock College and pioneer in early childhood education
