= Champlain Valley =

Region of the United States around Lake Champlain

Coordinates: 44°27′31″N 73°25′34″W

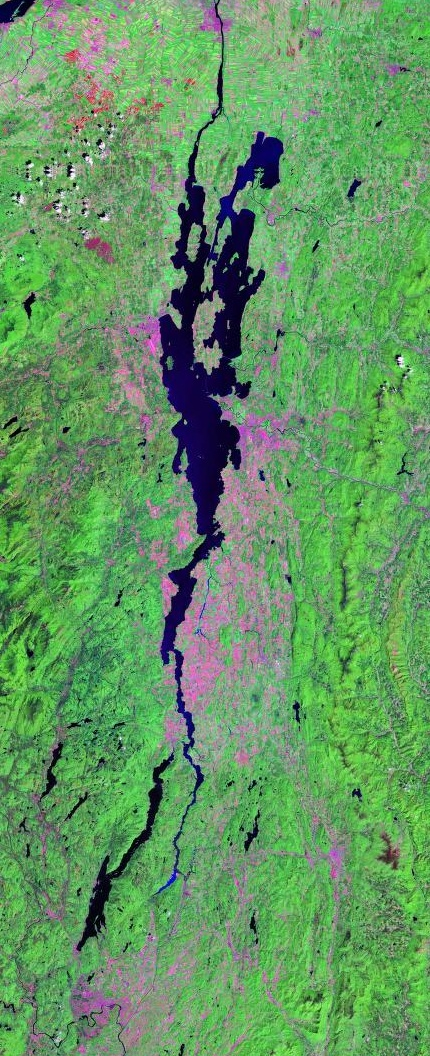
Landsat photo of the immediate Lake Champlain region—only part of the much longer drainage basin and overall valley which reaches the Atlantic Ocean north of Nova Scotia via the St. Lawrence Seaway.

The Champlain Valley is a region of the United States around Lake Champlain in Vermont and New York extending north slightly into Quebec, Canada. It is part of the St. Lawrence River drainage basin, drained northward by the Richelieu River into the St. Lawrence at Sorel-Tracy, Quebec (northeast of Montreal). The Richelieu valley is not generally referred to as part of the Champlain Valley.

The Champlain Lake Valley is the most heavily populated region in Vermont, broadly stretching eastward from the lake's shore to the base of the Green Mountains. The state's largest city, Burlington, is located on the lake, and the city's associated suburban communities encompass part of the central section of the valley. Beyond urbanized Chittenden County, however, the valley's landscape is primarily open pasture and row crops, making the Champlain Valley the most productive agricultural region of Vermont.

The New York portion of the Champlain Valley includes the eastern portions of Clinton County and Essex County. Most of this area is part of the Adirondack Park, offering tremendous views of the Adirondack High Peaks region and many recreational opportunities in the park and along the relatively undeveloped coast line of Lake Champlain. The city of Plattsburgh is to the north, and the historic town of Ticonderoga is in the southern part of the region. The northern part of Lake George is located at, and near Ticonderoga, and therefore is a part of the Champlain Valley.

== Geology and physiography ==
The Champlain Valley is among the northernmost valleys considered part of the Great Appalachian Valley reaching from Canada to Alabama.

The Champlain Valley is a physiographic section of the larger Saint Lawrence Valley province, which in turn is part of the larger Appalachian physiographic division. In Vermont, the Champlain Valley is equivalent to the Vermont Lowlands physiographic region, and extends southward into the Valley of Vermont. The Vermont Lowlands are primarily underlain by sedimentary rocks, especially limestone and shale, though metamorphic rocks such as marble and slate are also present.

Lake Champlain is situated in the Champlain Valley between the Green Mountains of Vermont and the Adirondack Mountains of New York, drained northward by the Richelieu River into the St. Lawrence River at Sorel-Tracy, Quebec (northeast of Montreal). Major tributaries of Lake Champlain include Otter Creek and the Winooski, Missisquoi, and Lamoille rivers in Vermont, and the Ausable, Chazy, Boquet, and Saranac rivers in New York. Lake Champlain also receives water from Lake George via the La Chute River

== See also ==
- Champlain Valley National Heritage Area
