= WIRD =

Former simulcast of WNBZ
- Lake Placid, New York; United States
- Frequency: 920 kHz
- Branding: WNBZ

Programming
- Format: Adult standards
- Affiliations: ABC Radio; Cumulus Media Networks

Ownership
- Owner: Radio Lake Placid, Inc.
- Sister stations: WLPW; WNBZ; WNBZ-FM; WRGR

History
- First air date: November 21, 1961
- Last air date: May 24, 2017 (date of license cancellation)

Technical information
- Facility ID: 54652
- Class: D
- Power: 5,000 watts day; 87 watts night
- Transmitter coordinates: 44°15′41.5″N 74°1′21.7″W

WIRD (920 AM) was a radio station broadcasting an adult standards format, simulcasting sister station WNBZ. Licensed to Lake Placid, New York, United States, the station was owned by Radio Lake Placid, Inc. and featured programming from ABC Radio. It went on the air in 1961, and lost its license in 2017.

== History ==
A construction permit for a daytime-only station on 920 kHz in Lake Placid was issued to WIRY, Inc., in October 1961. Its principals were Charles B. Britt, Donald L. Pelkey, Jeanette B. Britt, Margaret R. Hall, and Ralph S. Hatcher. The new station, assigned the call sign WIRD, went on the air November 21, 1961. WIRD was associated with existing Plattsburgh radio station WIRY.

WIRY, Inc., sold WIRD to Lincoln F. Dixon, engineering supervisor for WPTZ in Plattsburgh; Donald A. Nardiello, WIRD's general manager; Carol Dixon; and Kathryn Nardiello for $40,000 in 1965. By 1971, WIRD offered a middle of the road format. The Dixons sold their interest in the station to the Nardiellos in 1973. An FM simulcast, WLPW (105.5), was added in 1979; by October 1980, WIRD and WLPW were affiliated with the CBS Radio Network.

Donald and Kitty Nardiello sold WIRD and WLPW to Adirondack Network Systems (ANS) for $1 million in 1988. The new company's principals were Dennis M. Ryan, Robert P. Ambrosini, Richard M. Feldman, Frederick J. Graber, Philip Saunders, Martin Stone, and Serge Lussi. By this point, the stations' format had evolved to adult contemporary, and the simulcast had been reduced to 80-percent. By 1993, ANS was in chapter 7 bankruptcy; control of the stations would be returned to the Nardiellos.

By 1997, when Jones Satellite Networks' adult contemporary programming was added to the simulcast of WIRD, WLPW, and WRGR in Tupper Lake, some talk programming was airing on WIRD only. In 1998, the three stations moved to an adult album alternative format; the following year, WIPS in Ticonderoga joined the "Radio Lake Placid" network. In February 2001, WIRD, which had broken away to carry sports and talk programming, became an ESPN Radio affiliate.

Ted Morgan, owner of WNBZ and WYZY in Saranac Lake, bought WIRD, WLPW, and WRGR from the Nardiellos for $700,000 in 2004. On November 26, 2008, WIRD dropped ESPN Radio for a simulcast of WNBZ; both stations, as well as WLPW and WRGR, already shared a morning show.

WIRD's license was canceled on May 24, 2017, for failure to pay debt it owed to the Federal Communications Commission (FCC), which prevented the station's license from being renewed. Shortly after the cancellation, on June 21, 2017, the Adirondack Daily Enterprise reported that WIRD had been off the air for at least two years.
