= WSLP =

Simulcast with WRGR Tupper Lake
- Ray Brook, New York; United States
- Broadcast area: Saranac Lake, New York
- Frequency: 93.3 MHz
- Branding: Lake FM

Programming
- Format: Variety hits
- Affiliations: Compass Media Networks; United Stations Radio Networks

Ownership
- Owner: Jonathan Becker; (North Country Radio Corp.)
- Sister stations: WLPW; WRGR; WVSL

History
- First air date: 2009
- Former call signs: WXMR (2009–2012); WPLB (2012–2016); WIRY-FM (2016–2020); WPLA (2020–2021)
- Former frequencies: 100.7 MHz (2011–2023)

Technical information
- Licensing authority: FCC
- Facility ID: 166029
- Class: A
- ERP: 3,100 watts
- HAAT: −52 meters (−171 ft)
- Transmitter coordinates: 44°15′43.3″N 74°1′20.4″W

Links
- Public license information: Public file; LMS
- Webcast: Listen live
- Website: www.lakefmradio.com

WSLP (93.3 FM, "Lake FM") is a commercial variety hits radio station broadcasting from Ray Brook, New York. It is owned by Jonathan Becker, through licensee North Country Radio Corp.

== History ==
The station was formerly WXMR at 100.7 MHz, with a tagline called "Radio Bistro". The call sign was changed to WPLB on August 6, 2012; it eventually changed to a country music format, "Kickin' Country," which was simulcast with WNMR (107.1 FM, now WWFK) and competed with WOKO and WTNN.

In March 2016, WXMR was leased to WIRY. The arrangement allowed for the FM station to occasionally broadcast separate programming from the AM station (for instance, WIRY's regular programming could continue on the FM station while the AM station carried a sporting event). The call sign was changed to WIRY-FM on March 15, 2016.

WIRY-FM went silent on January 7, 2020, after WIRY changed ownership the previous month and the new owners ended WIRY-FM's agreement to operate it. An application was filed to move the frequency from Plattsburgh West to Ray Brook, New York. The station changed its call sign to WPLA on July 10, 2020.

In late January 2021, WPLA moved from Plattsburgh West, New York to Ray Brook, New York. WPLA picked up the WSLP call sign on January 29, 2021, as well as the "Lake FM" variety hits format from 93.3 FM Saranac Lake, which picked up the WPLA call sign. That June, Benjamin Homel (known professionally as Randy Michaels), who owned the station through Radioactive, LLC, filed to sell the station to operator North Country Radio Corp. The sale, at a price of $45,000, was consummated on October 18, 2021.

On May 2, 2023, the station began broadcasting on 93.3 FM. The Federal Communications Commission licensed the station for operation on 93.3 FM on May 17, 2023.
