= WEXP =

WEXP may refer to:

- WEXP (FM), a radio station (102.9 FM) licensed to Westport, New York, United States
- WEXP (La Salle University), a former campus carrier current radio station at La Salle University in Philadelphia, Pennsylvania, United States, which used this as a self-assigned identifier
- WCLX-LP, a radio station (107.3 FM) licensed to Moriah, New York, which held the WEXP-LP call sign in July 2024
- WMUD (FM), a radio station (101.5 FM) licensed to Brandon, Vermont, United States, which held the WEXP call sign from 1998 until 2024
- WKOL, a radio station (105.1 FM) licensed to Plattsburgh, New York, which held the WEXP-FM call sign from 1994 until 1995
- WLGQ, an Alabama radio station founded at Gadsden State College, which held the WEXP call sign from 1974 until 1985
