= WCLX =

WCLX may refer to:

- WCLX-LP, a radio station (107.3 FM) licensed to Moriah, New York, United States
- WEXP (FM), a radio station (102.9 FM) licensed to Westport, New York, which held the WCLX call sign from 1999 until 2024
- WYRO, a radio station (98.7 FM) licensed to McArthur, Ohio, United States, which held the WCLX call sign from 1997 until January 1998 and July to December 1998
- WAVC, a radio station (93.9 FM) licensed to Mio, Michigan, United States, which held the WCLX call sign from 1993 until 1996
- WBCM (FM), a radio station (93.5 FM) licensed to Boyne City, Michigan, which held the WCLX call sign from 1976 until 1991
