= WSNO =

WSNO may refer to:

- WSNO (AM), a radio station (1450 AM) licensed to serve Barre, Vermont, United States
- WSNO-FM, a radio station (97.9 FM) licensed to serve Au Sable, New York, United States
