= WNBZ =

WNBZ may refer to:

- WNBZ-FM, a radio station (106.3 FM) licensed to serve Saranac, New York, United States
- WVSL (AM), a radio station (1240 AM) licensed to serve Saranac Lake, New York, which held the call sign WNBZ until 2018
