= NBC 31 =

NBC 31 may refer to:

== Current ==
- WRDE-LD in Salisbury, Maryland

== Former ==
- KBMT in Beaumont, Texas (1954 to 1956)
- WAAY-TV in Huntsville, Alabama (primary from 1968 to 1977 and secondary from 1983 to 1988)
- WNNE in Montpelier, Vermont (1978 to 2018)
  - Was semi-satellite of WPTZ in Plattsburgh, New York after 1990
