= WIRY (AM) =

Radio station in Plattsburgh, New York

- Plattsburgh, New York; United States
- Broadcast area: Burlington-Plattsburgh
- Frequency: 1340 kHz
- Branding: Hometown Radio

Programming
- Format: Full service
- Affiliations: Westwood One; New York Giants Radio Network; New York Yankees Radio Network

Ownership
- Owner: Dave Andrews; (Hometown Communications, LLC)

History
- First air date: January 30, 1950
- Last air date: May 27, 2025

Technical information
- Facility ID: 73035
- Class: C
- Power: 1,000 watts day; 940 watts night
- Transmitter coordinates: 44°40′12.2″N 73°26′39.5″W

Links
- Webcast: Listen live
- Website: wiry.com

WIRY was an AM radio station licensed to Plattsburgh, New York. The locally owned and operated radio station broadcast at 1340 kHz in C-QUAM AM stereo, and operated with a full-service radio format from 1950 to 2025.

== History ==
Martin L. Schulman filed an application to build a new station on 1340 kHz in Plattsburgh on April 11, 1949, with preliminary plans to eventually transfer the station to a corporation partially owned by employees. After an amendment to specify Clinton County Broadcasting Corporation as the applicant that September, the construction permit was issued on November 4, 1949, and issued the WIRY call sign that December. Additional principals in Clinton County Broadcasting included former WEAV commercial manager Joel H. Scheier, Walter H. Petterson, and John R. Commins; Schulman was Scheier's son-in-law. WIRY went on the air January 30, 1950, as a Mutual Broadcasting System affiliate. As early as 1955, Scheier told trade publication Broadcasting–Telecasting that WIRY's format consisted of "local programming of news and music that our local listeners like", accompanied by "a tremendous amount of public service".

In the early 1950s, WIRY's owners made plans to expand into television through an affiliated company, Great Northern Television. It first applied for ultra high frequency channel 28 at Plattsburgh in 1952. After withdrawing the channel 28 application on September 29, 1953, Great Northern instead proposed to use the very high frequency channel 5 allocation at Lake Placid to build a station near Bloomingdale on October 9; this construction permit was issued that December. After relocating the channel 5 permit to North Pole, the television station signed on in 1954 as WIRI. Despite the association with WIRI television, Joel H. Scheier affirmed that WIRY's principals remained committed to radio, vowing that, "Radio will never die, nor ever fade away." In 1956, WIRI was sold to Rollins Broadcasting and renamed WPTZ.

Joel H. Scheier bought Armand A. Mancuso's 10-percent stake in Clinton County Broadcasting for $4,500 in 1955, increasing his interest in WIRY to 43 1/3 percent. The following year, Scheier paid $16,000 to acquire Vincent S. Jerry, John M. Nazak, Martin Schulman, Donald L. Pelkey and Thomas A. Robinson's stakes in the station. In 1958, Scheier sold WIRY to Charles B. Britt Jr., executive vice president of WLOS and WLOS-TV in Asheville, North Carolina, for $200,000.

Britt's WIRY, Inc., put a second station on the air in 1961: WIRD (920 AM) in Lake Placid. WIRD was sold to a group led by Lincoln F. Dixon and Donald A. Nardiello in 1965. Control of WIRY was transferred to Britt-Pelkey, Inc., in 1973; in 1976, Donald L. Pelkey bought Britt's stake, becoming 85-percent owner of WIRY. By 1989, when the station bought a Birch ratings breakout book after previously refusing to subscribe to Arbitron and Birch ratings for the full Plattsburgh–Burlington market, WIRY was reaching 36.2 percent of Clinton County radio listeners.

Donald Pelkey sold WIRY to William Santa's Hometown Radio Inc. for $175,000 in 1994. Santa owned the auto dealership that was next door to WIRY's Cornelia Street studios. In 2008, the station vacated the Cornelia Street facility, which had formerly been a veterinary office and was demolished to make room for a Walgreens, and moved to a new studio on US 9 south of Plattsburgh. With the move, the station began transmitting into a Valcom whip antenna, instead of the guyed tower used on Cornelia Street.

WIRY began leasing FM radio station WPLB (100.7) in 2016; the rechristened WIRY-FM would mostly simulcast the AM side, with syndicated music programs airing in place of sports (Bill Santa, WIRY's owner, stated that major sports teams prefer AM radio affiliates).

In September 2019, a coalition led by the station's news director Dave Andrews along with Clinton County businessmen and politicians was revealed to be in negotiations to purchase WIRY from Bill Santa. The station's full-service format was not expected to change. The purchase by Hometown Communications, LLC, at a price of $287,500, was consummated on December 27, 2019. The new owners did not continue the local marketing agreement with Radioactive, LLC, to simulcast on WIRY-FM, which went off the air in early 2020. Andrews' group, who called themselves the "Four Amigos", vowed to restore local management to the station (Santa did not live in Plattsburgh by the time of the sale) and keep it viable; they also tightened WIRY's playlist, focusing exclusively on songs from the 1950s, 1960s, and 1970s rather than its previous mixture of oldies and newer music.

On March 12, 2025, WIRY announced the cancellation of all of the station's spoken word programming and unveiled plans to introduce special pre-recorded segments celebrating the station's diamond anniversary. After fierce listener backlash, WIRY acknowledged the next day that this programming stunt was actually a farewell montage, and that WIRY was shutting down. WIRY ownership blamed the change on the shift of music listening habits to online platforms, which diverted listeners away from local full-service radio; the station also cited an increase in music royalties and an inability to recruit advertising salespeople. WIRY formally submitted its silent notification to the Federal Communications Commission (FCC) in early June 2025, saying that it had left the air on May 27; the FCC cancelled the station's license on September 18, 2025.

In January 2026, Mermel & McLain Management, owner of WDEV and several other radio stations in neighboring Vermont, filed to purchase the dormant WIRY license, which had been reinstated in November 2025. Principals Myers Mermel and Caroline McLain intend to relaunch the station with a Plattsburgh-oriented morning news program, with the rest of its programming being simulcast from WDEV.

== Programming ==
At the time of its closure, WIRY operated a full-service, music-centered and locally originated format featuring an eclectic variety of genera. The station described its format as a mix of adult contemporary, country music, and oldies. The station had a live local morning show and an extensive local news and sports bureau, carrying the Plattsburgh Cardinals hockey team in winter months and high school sports. The station also maintained several creative advertising programs, including a listing of lunch menus from advertisers and a radio help-wanted show titled "Who's Hiring". Weather forecasts were taken from public domain National Weather Service reports.

The station served as an affiliate for the New York Yankees, New York Giants, Westwood One, The Beatle Years with Bob Malik, When Radio Was and The Country Music Greats Radio Show.

In addition, the station also streamed on the Internet. WIRY streamed continuously after starting a website in October 1997, and survived the Internet radio bust that forced many stations to stop streaming c. 2002.
