= WWWF =

WWWF may refer to:

- World Wide Wrestling Federation, original name of what is now WWE
- WWWF-FM, a radio station (103.1 FM) licensed to serve Bay Shore, New York, United States
- WWFK, a radio station (107.1 FM) licensed to serve Dannemora, New York, United States, which held the WWWF call sign from 2017 through 2018
