= WMUD =

WMUD may refer to:

- WMUD (FM), radio station
- WCLX-LP, a radio station formerly known as WMUD-LP
- Willie Miller Urban Design
