= WWFY =

Radio station in Berlin–Montpelier, Vermont

- Berlin, Vermont; United States
- Broadcast area: Barre-Montpelier, Vermont
- Frequency: 100.9 MHz (HD Radio)
- Branding: Froggy 97.5 & & 100.9

Programming
- Format: Country
- Subchannels: HD2: Adult contemporary "97.9 & 105.7 The Penguin" (WSNO-FM simulcast)
- Affiliations: Premiere Networks

Ownership
- Owner: Great Eastern Radio, LLC
- Sister stations: WRFK; WWFK; WJKS

History
- First air date: April 2, 1975 (as WCVM in Middlebury)
- Former call signs: WCVM (1974–1991); WGTK (1991–1999)

Technical information
- Licensing authority: FCC
- Facility ID: 17808
- Class: C3
- ERP: 4,500 watts
- HAAT: 237 meters (778 ft)
- Transmitter coordinates: 44°7′30.6″N 72°28′26.3″W
- Translator: HD2: 105.7 W289CH (Barre)
- Repeater: 97.5 WTNN (Bristol)

Links
- Public license information: Public file; LMS
- Webcast: Listen live
- Website: www.froggyvermont.com

WWFY (100.9 FM, "Froggy 100.9") is a radio station licensed to serve Berlin, Vermont. The station is owned by Great Eastern Radio. It airs a country music format.

The station has been assigned these call letters by the Federal Communications Commission since May 21, 1999.

While WWFY has broadcast to the Barre-Montpelier area since October 2000, the 100.9 frequency was originally allocated over the mountains in Middlebury, where the station signed on as WCVM on April 2, 1975. WCVM was a sister to WFAD (1490 AM) in Middlebury, and operated as a class A facility at 3000 watts. At its sign-on, WCVM carried an automated oldies format which lasted for several years. In the 1990s, the station, as WGTK, aired a classic rock format under the name "K101"; it marketed itself as "The Champlain Valley's classic rock station". In 1999, "K101", while keeping the classic rock format, moved to 93.7 FM, and became WRRO "The Arrow".

The current air staff includes JD Green (morning drive), Randy Laprade (midday) P.D. Jim Severance (afternoons) and The Lia Show (evenings).

WWFY, along with 29 other stations in northern New England formerly owned by Nassau Broadcasting Partners, was purchased at bankruptcy auction by Carlisle Capital Corporation, a company controlled by Bill Binnie (owner of WBIN-TV in Derry), on May 22, 2012. The station, and 12 of the other stations, were then acquired by Vertical Capital Partners, controlled by Jeff Shapiro. The deal was completed on November 30, 2012. The Vertical Capital Partners stations were transferred to Shapiro's existing Great Eastern Radio group on January 1, 2013.

The "Froggy" programming expanded to the Burlington area in June 2020, when WWFY began simulcasting on WJKS (104.3 FM) in Keeseville, New York. A third station, WTNN (97.5 FM) in Bristol, joined the simulcast in April 2026 after the station–which had previously offered a competing country format–was sold to Great Eastern Radio. WTNN would fully replace WJKS as the Burlington market outlet for "Froggy" on July 1, 2026, when WJKS broke away to launch its own classic country format.

== HD Radio ==
In September 2023, WWFY added a simulcast of sister station WSNO-FM, which broadcasts an adult hits format branded "The Penguin", on its HD2 subchannel; its programming is also carried on translator station W289CH (105.7 FM) in Barre. The move followed the shutdown of WSNO (1450 AM), the previous home of the "Penguin" programming, due to the loss of its transmitter site; the 105.7 translator formerly relayed WSNO (AM).
