= WRFK (FM) =

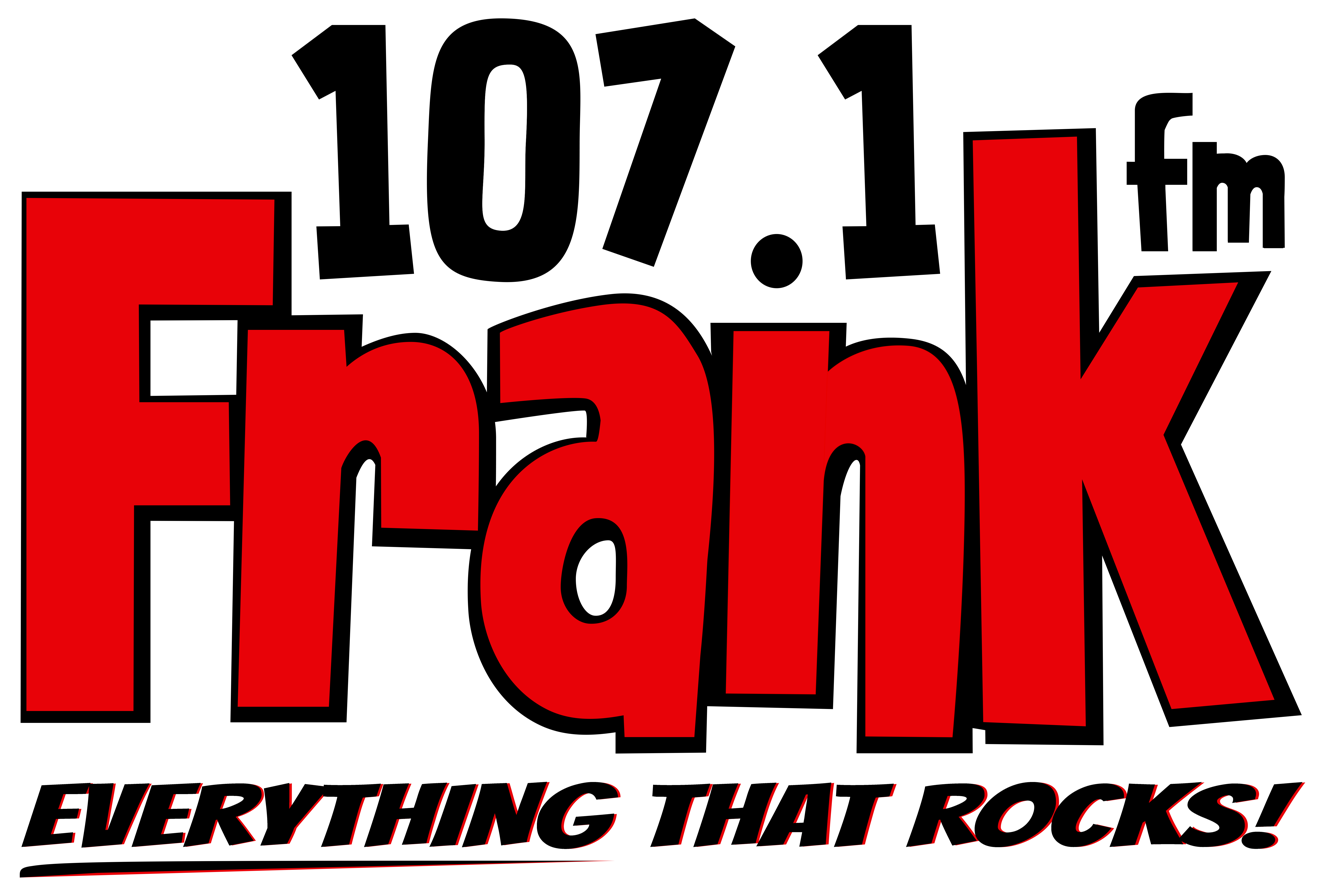
- Barre, Vermont; United States
- Broadcast area: Washington County, Vermont
- Frequency: 107.1 MHz
- Branding: 107.1 Frank FM

Programming
- Format: Classic rock

Ownership
- Owner: Great Eastern Radio, LLC
- Sister stations: WWFY; WWFK

History
- First air date: August 5, 1974 (as WORK)
- Former call signs: WORK (1974–2012)
- Call sign meaning: "Frank"

Technical information
- Licensing authority: FCC
- Facility ID: 34810
- Class: A
- ERP: 3,900 watts
- HAAT: 125 meters (410 ft)
- Transmitter coordinates: 44°9′30.2″N 72°28′44.3″W
- Repeater: 107.1 WWFK (Plattsburgh West, New York)

Links
- Public license information: Public file; LMS
- Webcast: Listen live
- Website: www.frankvermont.com

WRFK (107.1 MHz, "Frank FM") is an FM radio station licensed to Barre and serving central Vermont. Established in 1974, the station is owned by Jeffrey Shapiro's Great Eastern Radio. WRFK airs a classic rock format, and is simulcast in the Champlain Valley on WWFK (also on 107.1 FM) in Plattsburgh West, New York. The transmitter is located off Websterville Road and the studios and offices are on Jacques Street.

== History ==
The station signed on August 5, 1974, as WORK. It was originally owned by Robert Kimel, who also owned WSNO in Barre and WWSR AM-FM in St. Albans, and programmed an automated Top 40/hot AC format known as "Hit Parade". Kimel sold WORK and WSNO to Bull Moose Broadcasting in 1997; two years later, the stations were purchased by Vox Radio Group. Nassau Broadcasting Partners acquired most of Vox's northern New England radio stations in 2004, and changed WORK's format to classic hits on September 15, 2006.

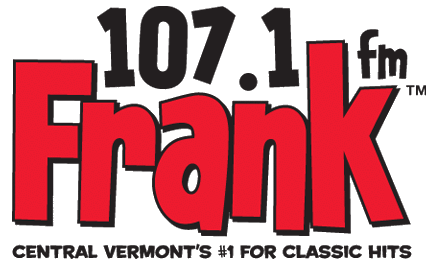
Logo for WRFK as a classic hits station, used from 2013 until August 15, 2017.

WORK, along with 29 other Nassau stations in northern New England, was purchased at bankruptcy auction by Carlisle Capital Corporation, a company controlled by Bill Binnie (owner of WBIN-TV in Derry, New Hampshire), on May 22, 2012. The station, and 12 of the other stations, were then acquired by Vertical Capital Partners, controlled by Jeff Shapiro. On November 14, 2012, the call letters changed to WRFK. The deal was completed on November 30, 2012. The Vertical Capital Partners stations were transferred to Shapiro's existing Great Eastern Radio group on January 1, 2013.

On June 26, 2020, WRFK began simulcasting on WPLA (renamed WWFK) in Dannemora, New York, which also operates on 107.1 FM; this brought the "Frank FM" programming into the Champlain Valley area.
