= WTNN =

Simulcasting WWFY Berlin
- Bristol, Vermont; United States
- Broadcast area: Burlington-Plattsburgh-Champlain Valley
- Frequency: 97.5 MHz
- Branding: Froggy 97.5 & 100.9

Programming
- Format: Country
- Affiliations: Compass Media Networks; Premiere Networks; Westwood One

Ownership
- Owner: Impact Radio, Inc.
- Operator: Great Eastern Radio, LLC
- Sister stations: WJKS; WSNO-FM; WWFK

History
- First air date: April 1, 2007

Technical information
- Licensing authority: FCC
- Facility ID: 166037
- Class: C3
- ERP: 8,700 watts
- HAAT: 157 meters (515 ft)
- Transmitter coordinates: 44°24′23.1″N 73°8′12.8″W

Links
- Public license information: Public file; LMS
- Webcast: Listen live
- Website: www.froggyvermont.com

WTNN (97.5 FM) is a commercial radio station licensed to Bristol, Vermont, and serving the Burlington-Plattsburgh-Champlain Valley radio market. It is owned by Impact Radio and broadcasts a country music format, simulcast with WWFY (100.9 FM) as "Froggy 97.5 & 100.9". A sale of WTNN to Great Eastern Radio, owner of WWFY, is pending.

The radio studios and offices are on Williston Road in South Burlington. The transmitter is on Brownell Road in Williston. WTNN has an effective radiated power (ERP) of 8,700 watts.

== History ==
After testing with music hooks as "Quick FM" in March 2007, WTNN first signed on the air on April 1, 2007, as "Eagle Country 97.5", competing against other country music stations in the region such as WOKO in Burlington and WJEN (94.5 FM) in Rutland. The station was originally owned by Impact Radio, a venture of Connecticut radio station owner John Fuller and Maryland communications lawyer Arthur Belendiuk. In 2025, Fuller bought Belendiuk's stake for $100,000.

In April 2026, WTNN was acquired by Jeff Shapiro's Great Eastern Radio, which already operated a competing country station, "Froggy 104.3/100.9", on WJKS in Keeseville, New York, and WWFY in Berlin. Pending Federal Communications Commission (FCC) approval, the $120,000 deal involves a local marketing agreement which took effect on April 1. On April 16, 2026, WTNN switched to a simulcast of WJKS and WWFY; the move left "Froggy" as the only competitor to WOKO in the Burlington market, after a fourth station–WCPV–dropped the format a month earlier. WTNN would fully replace WJKS as the Burlington market outlet for "Froggy" on July 1, 2026, when WJKS broke away to launch its own classic country format.
