= WMXR =

WMXR may refer to:

- WMXR-LP, a low-power radio station (92.7 FM) licensed to serve Miami, Florida, United States
- WJKS (FM), a radio station (104.3 FM) licensed to serve Keeseville, New York, United States, which held the call sign WMXR from 2012 to 2013
- WWOD, a radio station (93.9 FM) licensed to serve Woodstock, Vermont, United States, which held the call sign WMXR from 1988 to 2012
- WMXR, Marengo, IL
