= Philadelphia City Paper =

Philadelphia weekly newspaper

- Type: Alternative weekly
- Format: Tabloid
- Owner: Metro
- Publisher: Jennifer Clark
- Editor: Lillian Swanson
- Founded: November 1981; 44 years ago
- Ceased publication: October 2015; 10 years ago
- Headquarters: 30 S. 15th St., 14th floor Philadelphia, Pennsylvania 19102; U.S.
- Circulation: 70,000
- ISSN: 0733-6349
- Website: citypaper.net

Philadelphia City Paper was an alternative weekly newspaper in Philadelphia, Pennsylvania. The independently owned paper was free and published every Thursday in print and daily online at citypaper.net. Staff reporters focused on labor issues, politics, education and poverty. Critics reviewed the city's arts, entertainment, literary and restaurant scene. Listings of concerts, art exhibits, dance performances and other events were carried in the paper and in a comprehensive online events calendar.

The publication was established in November 1981 as a spinoff of the now-defunct WXPN Express newsletter. Philadelphia City Paper distributed 70,000 copies in more than 2,000 locations throughout Philadelphia, its suburbs and South Jersey. Its more than 2,000 orange-colored boxes and wire racks were found in Center City Philadelphia in cafes, small businesses and on many university campuses.

Each year, City Paper published a City Guide for college students and new residents.

Its monthly readership was 521,000, which was verified by Scarborough Research.

Founder Bruce Schimmel sold the paper to the Rock family (Milton L. Rock and his son Robert H. Rock) in 1996. In 2014, Metro acquired the City Paper from the Rock family. In 2015, the City Paper was sold to Broad Street Media, owner of Philadelphia Weekly. The last edition was published on October 8, 2015.
