= WRLH =

WRLH may refer to:

- WRLH-TV, a television station (channel 24, virtual 35) licensed to Richmond, Virginia, United States
- WRLH (New Hampshire), a television station (channel 31) formerly licensed to West Lebanon, New Hampshire, United States
- Tanah Grogot Airport in Tanah Grogot, Indonesia
