= WSNO (AM) =

- Barre, Vermont; United States
- Broadcast area: Washington County, Vermont
- Frequency: 1450 kHz
- Branding: The Penguin 97.9 105.7

Programming
- Format: Adult contemporary

Ownership
- Owner: Great Eastern Radio, LLC
- Sister stations: WRFK; WWFY; WWFK; WSNO-FM

History
- First air date: October 13, 1959
- Last air date: September 18, 2023
- Call sign meaning: "Snow"

Technical information
- Licensing authority: FCC
- Facility ID: 34813
- Class: C
- Power: 1,000 watts unlimited
- Transmitter coordinates: 44°11′40.2″N 72°30′50.4″W

Links
- Public license information: Public file; LMS
- Webcast: Listen live
- Website: www.thepenguinvermont.com

WSNO (1450 kHz; "The Penguin") was an AM radio station licensed to serve Barre, Vermont. The station, which operated from 1959 to 2023, was owned by Jeffrey Shapiro's Great Eastern Radio. It had most recently broadcast an adult contemporary format, simulcast from Burlington-market WSNO-FM 97.9 in Au Sable, New York, and also heard on translator W289CH (105.7 FM).

The station had been assigned the WSNO call letters by the Federal Communications Commission.

== History ==
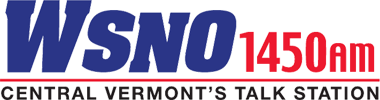
WSNO's logo as a talk station, used until August 29, 2016

WSNO signed on October 13, 1959. The original owners, JKL Broadcasting Company, sold the station to Robert Kimel and Bessie Grad, owners of WWSR in St. Albans, in 1960. By 1961, the station had affiliated with the CBS Radio Network. By 1970, WSNO had a middle of the road format, with twelve hours weekly of country music. In 1980, the station shifted to a full-time country music format. The station had added an affiliation with Mutual by 1993, while remaining a CBS affiliate. In 1996, the station switched to a news/talk format.

Kimel sold WSNO and sister station WORK (107.1 FM, now WRFK) to Bull Moose Broadcasting in 1997; two years later, the stations were purchased by Vox Radio Group. Nassau Broadcasting Partners acquired most of Vox's northern New England radio stations in 2004.

WSNO, along with 29 other Nassau stations in northern New England, was purchased at a bankruptcy auction by Carlisle Capital Corporation, a company controlled by Bill Binnie (owner of WBIN-TV in Derry), on May 22, 2012. The station, and 12 of the other stations, were then acquired by Vertical Capital Partners, controlled by Jeff Shapiro. The deal was completed on November 30, 2012. The Vertical Capital Partners stations were transferred to Shapiro's existing Great Eastern Radio group on January 1, 2013.

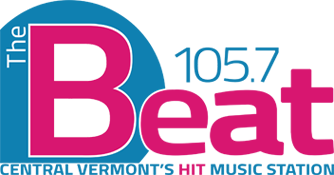
WSNO's logo as "105.7 The Beat", used from September 2, 2016, to January 1, 2022

In the later years of its talk format, WSNO's programming included Imus in the Morning, The Glenn Beck Radio Program, The Rush Limbaugh Show, and The Howie Carr Show. WSNO also featured local news and weather, high school sports, NFL football, Boston Bruins and NCAA basketball. WSNO ended its talk format after 20 years on August 29, 2016, and began stunting. The station introduced a top 40 format at midnight on September 2, 2016, and concurrently began simulcasting on translator W289CH (105.7 FM); the station was branded as "105.7 The Beat". The first song on The Beat was "Can't Stop the Feeling!" by Justin Timberlake. Despite the format change, WSNO continued its high school sports coverage.

On January 1, 2022, WSNO began simulcasting newly-acquired sister station WXMS (which concurrently became WSNO-FM) from Au Sable, New York (near Burlington and Plattsburgh), with an adult hits format branded as "The Penguin". All three of the initial members of the new format's airstaff previously worked at Burlington top 40 station WXXX.

WSNO went silent in September 2023 after losing its transmitter site; the "Penguin" programming was moved to the second HD Radio channel of WWFY (100.9 FM) to continue to feed the 105.7 translator. The Federal Communications Commission cancelled the station's license on September 5, 2024.
