= WRGR =

Adult contemporary radio station in Tupper Lake, New York, United States

Simulcast with WSLP Ray Brook
- Tupper Lake, New York; United States
- Frequency: 102.1 MHz
- Branding: Lake FM

Programming
- Format: Variety hits
- Affiliations: Compass Media Networks; United Stations Radio Networks

Ownership
- Owner: Jonathan Becker and Gregory Gallacher; (North Country Radio Corp.)
- Sister stations: WLPW; WSLP; WVSL

History
- First air date: March 17, 1980 (as WTPL-FM)
- Former call signs: WTPL-FM (1980–1987)
- Call sign meaning: RGR Broadcasting (former owner)

Technical information
- Licensing authority: FCC
- Facility ID: 56078
- Class: A
- ERP: 140 watts
- HAAT: 441 meters (1,447 ft)
- Transmitter coordinates: 44°9′35.2″N 74°28′32.6″W

Links
- Public license information: Public file; LMS
- Webcast: Listen live
- Website: www.lakefmradio.com

WRGR (102.1 FM) is a radio station serving Tupper Lake, New York, United States. The station is owned by Jonathan Becker and Gregory Gallacher, through licensee North Country Radio Corp. It is a simulcast of WSLP (100.7 FM) from Ray Brook.

== History ==
The station went on the air as WTPL-FM on March 17, 1980. On August 31, 1987, the station changed its call sign to the current WRGR.

WRGR formerly broadcast a classic rock format branded as "Rock 105", which was simulcast with WLPW (105.5 FM) in Lake Placid, New York. In June 2017, the Adirondack Daily Enterprise reported that the stations had switched to a simulcast of sister station WNBZ-FM. By November 2017, WRGR had gone silent.

On February 12, 2018, Radio Lake Placid, Inc filed to sell the station to Border Media. Border Media is led by Ricki Lee, CEO of radio technology company Aiir. The FCC granted the assignment of the license on August 28, 2018. Border Media relaunched the station with a classic hits format branded as Lake FM - The Tri-Lakes Greatest Hits in September 2018.

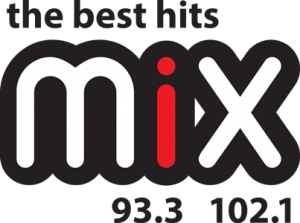
Logo as "The Mix"

On July 1, 2019, WRGR rebranded to "The Mix" and merged to become a simulcast of 93.3 WSLP. The station was operated under an LMA by North Country Radio Corp., the owners of WSLP and WLPW.

On September 18, 2020, WRGR changed its format from adult contemporary to variety hits, branded as "Lake FM". Effective October 18, 2021, North Country Radio Corp. acquired the WRGR license in exchange for what had become Warrensburg/Lake George-based WPLA (93.5).
