= Hearst Television =

Broadcasting subsidiary of Hearst Communications

Hearst Television, Inc.
- Formerly: Hearst Broadcasting (1931–1997); Hearst-Argyle Television (1997–2009)
- Type: Subsidiary
- Industry: Broadcast television and syndication; Television production; Educational television
- Predecessor: Hearst Broadcasting; Argyle Television Holdings II
- Founded: 1931; 95 years ago (as Hearst Broadcasting)
- Headquarters: New York, New York, United States
- Area served: United States (Nationwide)
- Key people: Michael J. Hayes; (president)
- Products: Broadcast television
- Number of employees: approx. 3000 (full-time)
- Parent: Hearst Communications
- Divisions: Hearst Media Production Group
- Website: hearst.com/broadcasting

Hearst Television, Inc. (formerly Hearst-Argyle Television) is a broadcasting company in the United States owned by Hearst Communications, made up of a group of television and radio stations, and the Hearst Media Production Group, a distributor of programming in broadcast syndication.

== History ==
Hearst-Argyle was formed in 1997 with the merger of Hearst Corporation's broadcasting division and stations owned by Argyle Television Holdings II, which is partially related to the company of the same name who (in 1994) sold its stations to New World Communications, stations that eventually became Fox-owned stations (Hearst itself, unusual for any American broadcast group, has never held a Fox affiliation on any of its stations). Hearst's involvement in broadcasting dates to the 1920s.

In 1980, Hearst Broadcasting purchased WDTN in Dayton, Ohio, from Grinnell College for a price estimated to be $45–48 million.

Hearst-Argyle announced its purchase of the nine television stations and two radio stations owned by Pulitzer Publishing Company in May 1998, in a deal worth $1.15 billion in stock. The acquisition was completed in March 1999.

In terms of audience reach, Hearst is the third-largest group owner of ABC-affiliated stations, behind the E. W. Scripps Company and Sinclair Broadcast Group, and ahead of Tegna Inc., and the second-largest group owner of NBC affiliates, behind Tegna.

Hearst-owned ABC affiliates in National Football League markets simulcast Monday Night Football games from ESPN that involve these teams — ESPN is 18% owned by Hearst, and 10% by the NFL, with the remaining 72% of shares owned by ABC's parent, The Walt Disney Company. Other Hearst-owned stations also carry ESPN-aired NFL games, even though they are affiliated with other networks (like WBAL-TV, Baltimore's NBC affiliate). Hearst also holds some joint ventures for syndicated programming with NBCUniversal Syndication Studios.

On June 3, 2009, the Hearst Corporation announced that it would purchase substantially all of the stock not held by Hearst. Hearst-Argyle Television then dropped "Argyle" from its name and became a wholly owned subsidiary of the Hearst Corporation.

In February 2009, Hearst-Argyle announced that its stations (except for KITV and its satellites in Hawaii, which had already completed their transition to digital, and WPTZ in Plattsburgh, New York, and WNNE in Hartford, Vermont, which followed the other Champlain Valley stations in transitioning on February 17, 2009) would comply with the new DTV transition date of June 12, 2009.

First Hearst-Argyle Television logo from 1997 to 2007.

Hearst-Argyle Television logo, 2007–2009

Currently, Hearst owns a total of 34 overall television stations but considers two groups of four stations and an NBC station with an ABC digital subchannel joint operations, bringing its count down to 31 under that consideration: eleven NBC affiliates, fifteen ABC affiliates (one as a subchannel of an NBC affiliate, and one which acts as a two-station simulcast), six CBS affiliates (two traditional and four subchannels [half with two NBC affiliates and the other half with two ABC affiliates]), six CW affiliates (two traditional, two subchannel [which are part of a two-station simulcast], and two channel shares), one MyNetworkTV affiliate, and one independent station. Most of the company's subchannel stations broadcast either Weigel Broadcasting's MeTV or NBC's Cozi TV through national affiliation deals, along with being charter carriers of Weigel's two newest concepts, Heroes & Icons, and Story Television. Since December 1, 2014, Des Moines CBS affiliate KCCI has used its third subchannel as an H&I affiliate carrying MyNetworkTV programming in primetime. Hearst also owns two radio stations in Baltimore, the last remaining from the company divesting most of their radio assets after the Telecommunications Act of 1996 went into effect. As already mentioned above, none of Hearst's stations have ever held a Fox affiliation, with the exception of two WMUR translators in the northern part of New Hampshire disaffiliating with the network upon Hearst's assumption of ownership of WMUR.

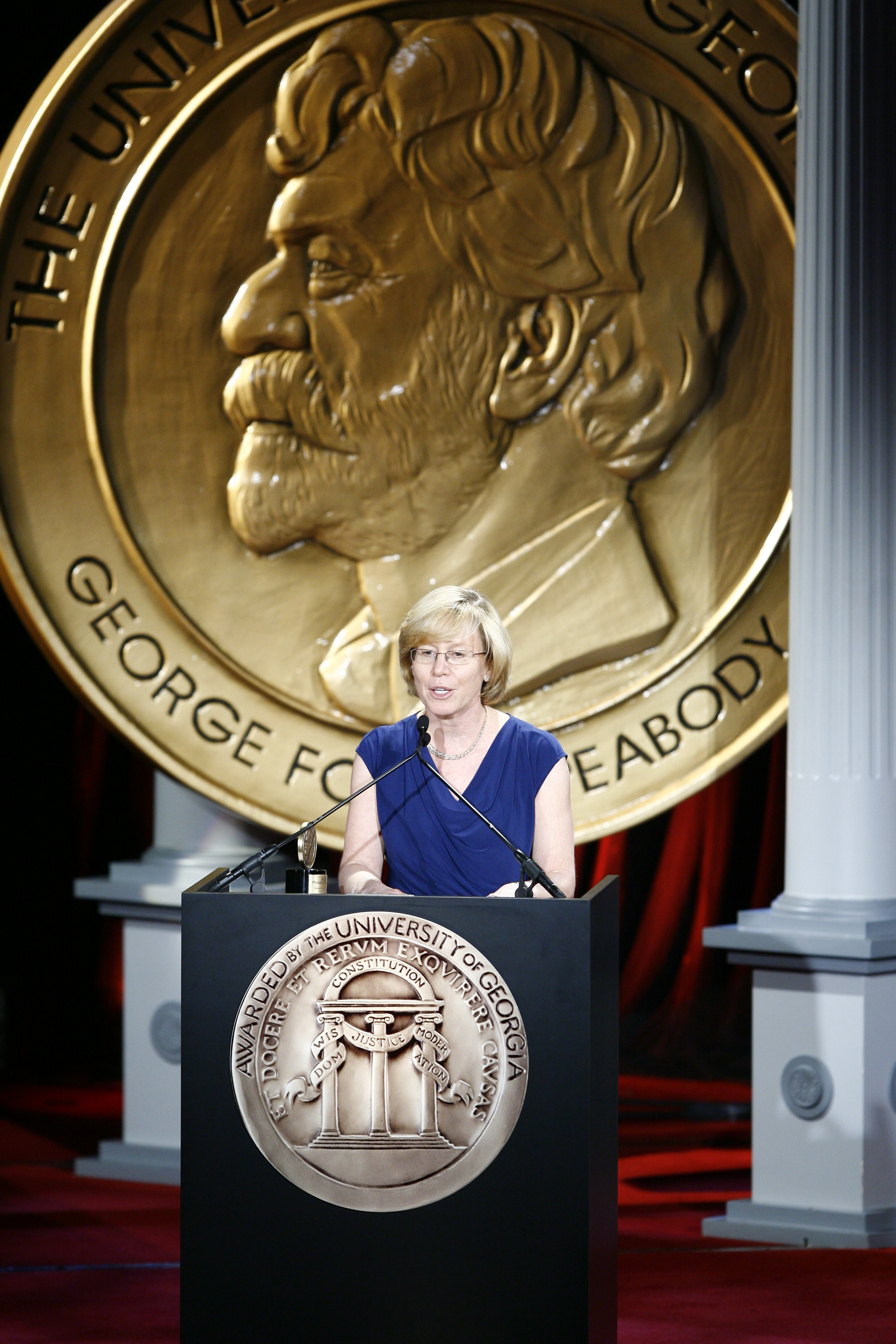
Candy Altman at the 68th Annual Peabody Awards for Hearst-Argyle Television-Commitment 2008

Some Hearst-owned stations use the "Commitment (Year)" banner for all political news coverage leading up to the local, national, and statewide elections in lieu of a localized version of their associated network's political branding. This started in 2000. Hearst also maintains a Washington, D.C. bureau to assist its stations in coverage of national politics, including on-air reporters and facilities and equipment assistance for local stations. Many Hearst stations license the "Operation High School" branding for coverage of local high school sports. In 2007, Hearst-Argyle became one of the first television broadcasting groups to post its news stories on YouTube. WCVB-TV, KCRA-TV, WTAE-TV, WBAL-TV and WMUR-TV were the first stations in Hearst-Argyle's station group to do this.

Until 2009, three of Hearst's television stations (KCWE, WMOR-TV, and WPBF) and its two radio stations (WBAL radio and WIYY) were owned by Hearst Broadcasting, Inc., an indirect wholly owned subsidiary of the Hearst Corporation through which Hearst ultimately controlled Hearst-Argyle Television, as opposed to Hearst-Argyle itself; Hearst-Argyle still operated these stations under a management services agreement. These stations were transferred to Hearst Television shortly after its privatization. Hearst's television and radio cluster in Baltimore additionally serves as the flagship stations and operation bases for the Baltimore Ravens radio and television networks, and as the flagship/operations base for the Baltimore Orioles Radio Network.

On August 20, 2014, it was announced that Hearst Television would acquire WVTM in Birmingham, Alabama, and WJCL in Savannah, Georgia, from Media General, which divested those stations under FCC advisement as part of its acquisition of LIN Media.

In 2021, Hearst began to carry the home shopping network Shop LC on several its stations under a revenue-sharing agreement with that network's owners. In most markets, Hearst did not pursue cable or satellite carriage for Shop LC, as the network already pays providers nationwide to carry its network on several channel slots per system.

On September 20, 2021, Hearst launched Very Local, an over-the-top media service which consists of news programming from its television stations as well as nationally produced content such as Chronicle and Matter of Fact.

On April 5, 2023, the company began the process of purchasing NBC affiliate WBBH-TV in Fort Myers, Florida, which would be acquired from Waterman Broadcasting for $220 million. The transaction included the local marketing agreement (LMA) for ABC affiliate WZVN-TV with Montclair Communications. The sale was completed on June 30, 2023.

== Television production ==
Hearst Television also produces the weekly public-affairs program Matter of Fact with Soledad O'Brien. Outside of the Hearst stations and A&E, the show is distributed in national broadcast syndication by Sony Pictures Television.

In 2019, former Today consumer affairs reporter Jeff Rossen joined Hearst as a multi-platform consumer affairs reporter, whose reports (which as of April 2020, include COVID-19 pandemic consumer issue Q&A segments) are syndicated throughout the chain, in addition to full-scale semi-annual consumer specials that are also carried by Hearst Television stations.

Hearst once owned Hearst-Argyle Television Productions, a producer and distributor of syndicated programming. As part of Hearst-Argyle's acquisition of KCRA-TV in Sacramento, the company also acquired Kelly News & Entertainment, which was merged into Hearst-Argyle Television Productions. In January 2001, NBC Enterprises and Hearst-Argyle agreed to merge their production and distribution operations into a joint venture majority-owned by NBC; this followed a December 2000 deal between the NBC-owned stations, Gannett, and Hearst-Argyle to develop programming. NBC Enterprises continued to produce some programming from the WCVB-TV studios in Needham, Massachusetts until June 2003.

On January 6, 2017, Hearst acquired majority control of Charleston, South Carolina-based syndicator Litton Entertainment, which has control of four of the five E/I-compliant Saturday morning blocks on the five major broadcast networks (also encompassing a best-of package in syndication called Go Time), along with being a syndicator of traditional programming. The deal closed on February 1. Hearst acquired the remaining interest in Litton in 2021; in January 2022, it rebranded the entity—which, in addition to Litton's existing programming, had also taken over production of Matter of Fact with Soledad O'Brien— as Hearst Media Production Group.

On July 23, 2026, it was announced that Nexstar Media Group's CBS affiliates in seven markets would switch to digital subchannels owned by Hearst and Forum Communications (for North Dakota) effective August 1.

== Current stations ==
=== Television ===
Stations are listed alphabetically by state and city of license.

(**) – Indicates a station that was built and signed-on by Hearst.

Media market	State	Station	Purchased	Affiliation	Notes
Birmingham–Tuscaloosa–Anniston	Alabama	WVTM-TV	2014	NBC; CBS (DT4)	
Fort Smith–Fayetteville–Rogers	Arkansas	KHBS	1996	ABC; The CW (DT2)	(Note: Owned by Argyle Television Holdings II prior to the formation of Hearst-Argyle Television in 1997.)
Fort Smith–Fayetteville–Rogers	Arkansas	KHOG-TV	1996	ABC; The CW (DT2)	(Note: Satellite of KHBS.)
Sacramento–Stockton–Modesto	California	KCRA-TV	1999	NBC	
Sacramento–Stockton–Modesto	California	KQCA	2000	The CW (primary)/MyNetworkTV (secondary)	
Salinas–Monterey–Santa Cruz	California	KSBW	1998	NBC; ABC (DT2)	(Note: Affected by an ownership swap between Hearst-Argyle and Sunrise Television in 1998.)
Daytona Beach–Orlando–Clermont	Florida	WESH	1999	NBC	
Daytona Beach–Orlando–Clermont	Florida	WKCF	2006	The CW	
Fort Myers–Cape Coral–Naples	Florida	WBBH-TV	2023	NBC	
Fort Myers–Cape Coral–Naples	Florida	WZVN-TV	2023	ABC	(Note: Owned by Hoffman Communications, Inc.)
Lakeland–Tampa–St. Petersburg	Florida	WMOR-TV	1996	Independent	
Tequesta–West Palm Beach	Florida	WPBF	1997	ABC	
Savannah	Georgia	WJCL	2014	ABC	
Des Moines	Iowa	KCCI	1999	CBS	
Louisville	Kentucky	WLKY	1999	CBS	
New Orleans	Louisiana	WDSU	1999	NBC	
Poland Spring–Portland	Maine	WMTW	2004	ABC	
Poland Spring–Portland	Maine	WPXT	2018	The CW	
Baltimore	Maryland	WBAL-TV **	1948	NBC	
Boston	Massachusetts	WCVB-TV	1986	ABC	
Jackson	Mississippi	WAPT	1994	ABC; CBS (DT4)	
Kansas City	Missouri	KMBC-TV	1982	ABC	
Kansas City	Missouri	KCWE	2006	The CW	(Note: KCWE has been managed by Hearst since its sign-on in 1996.)
Omaha	Nebraska	KETV	1999	ABC	
Manchester	New Hampshire	WMUR-TV	2001	ABC	
Albuquerque–Santa Fe	New Mexico	KOAT-TV	1999	ABC; CBS (DT4)	
Winston-Salem–Greensboro–High Point	North Carolina	WXII-TV	1999	NBC	
Winston-Salem–Greensboro–High Point	North Carolina	WCWG	2018	The CW	(Note: Hearst purchased WCWG outright from former owner Lockwood Broadcast Group, but operated the station after the channel share went into effect.)
Cincinnati	Ohio	WLWT	1997	NBC	(Note: Affected by an ownership swap between Argyle II and Gannett in 1997.)
Oklahoma City	Oklahoma	KOCO-TV	1997	ABC	
Lancaster–Harrisburg–York–Lebanon	Pennsylvania	WGAL	1999	NBC	
Pittsburgh	Pennsylvania	WTAE-TV **	1958	ABC	
Greenville–Spartanburg–Anderson	South Carolina	WYFF	1999	NBC; CBS (DT3)	
Burlington–Montpelier	Vermont	WPTZ	1998	NBC	
Burlington–Montpelier	Vermont	WNNE	1998	The CW	(Note: WNNE previously served Hartford, Vermont, and Hanover, New Hampshire, as a semi-satellite of WPTZ.)
Milwaukee	Wisconsin	WISN-TV	1955	ABC	

=== Radio ===
Media market	State	Station	Purchased	Current format	Notes
Baltimore	Maryland	WBAL	1935	News–talk	(Note: Utilizes a translator, W268BA, at 101.5 FM.)
Baltimore	Maryland	WIYY	1960	Mainstream rock	

== Former stations ==
=== Television ===
Media market	State	Station	Purchased	Sold	Notes
Honolulu	Hawaii	KITV	1995	2015	
Hilo	Hawaii	KHVO	1995	2015	(Note: Satellite of KITV.)
Wailuku	Hawaii	KMAU	1995	2015	
Grand Rapids–Kalamazoo–Battle Creek	Michigan	WZZM	1995	1997	
Buffalo	New York	WGRZ	1996	1997	
Dayton	Ohio	WDTN	1981	1998	
Providence	Rhode Island	WNAC-TV	1994	1998	(Note: Owned by Argyle, but operated from 1996–2001 by a third party with WPRI-TV.)
Clarksburg–Weston	West Virginia	WBOY-TV	2001		
New England		NECN	1992	2009	(Note: Joint venture with Comcast.)

=== Radio ===
(a partial listing)

AM Station	FM Station

City of license / Market	Station	Years owned	Current status
Phoenix, AZ	KTAR 620	1999–2001 (Note: Owned by Pulitzer prior to its acquisition by Hearst-Argyle in 1999.)	Owned by Bonneville International
Phoenix, AZ	KMVP 860	1999–2001	KNAI, owned by Farmworker Educational Radio Network
Phoenix, AZ	KKLT 98.7	1999–2001	KMVP-FM, owned by Bonneville International
Los Angeles, CA	KEHE 780	1935–1939	KABC (790 AM), owned by Cumulus Media
San Francisco, CA	KYA 1260	1934–1942	KSFB, owned by Relevant Radio
Louisville, KY	WLKY 970	1999–2000	WGTK, owned by Salem Media Group
New York City, NY	WGBS / WINS 1010	1931–1946	Owned by Audacy, Inc.
Kernersville–Winston-Salem–; Greensboro–High Point, NC	WXII 830	1999–2000	WTRU, owned by Truth Broadcasting Corporation
Oklahoma City, OK	KOMA 1480	1936–1939	KOKC (1520 AM), owned by Tyler Media Group
Pittsburgh, PA	WCAE / WRYT / WTAE 1250	1931–1997	WPGP, owned by Salem Media Group
Pittsburgh, PA	WCAE-FM / WRYT-FM / WTAE-FM / WXKX / WHTX / WVTY 96.1**	1960–1997	WKST-FM, owned by iHeartMedia
San Juan, PR	WAPA 680	1961–1991	WBQN, owned by Wifredo G. Blanco Pi
Austin, TX	KNOW 1500	1936–1939	KJFK (1490 AM), owned by Township Media, LLC
San Antonio, TX	KTSA 550	1936–1939	Owned by Connoisseur Media
Waco, TX	WACO 1420	1936–1939	KCLE (1460 AM), owned by M&M Broadcasters
Milwaukee, WI	WISN 1130	1928–1997	Owned by iHeartMedia
Milwaukee, WI	WISN-FM/WLPX/; WBTT/WLTQ 97.3**	1961–1997	WRNW, owned by iHeartMedia
