= Jeanne Moos =

CNN reporter

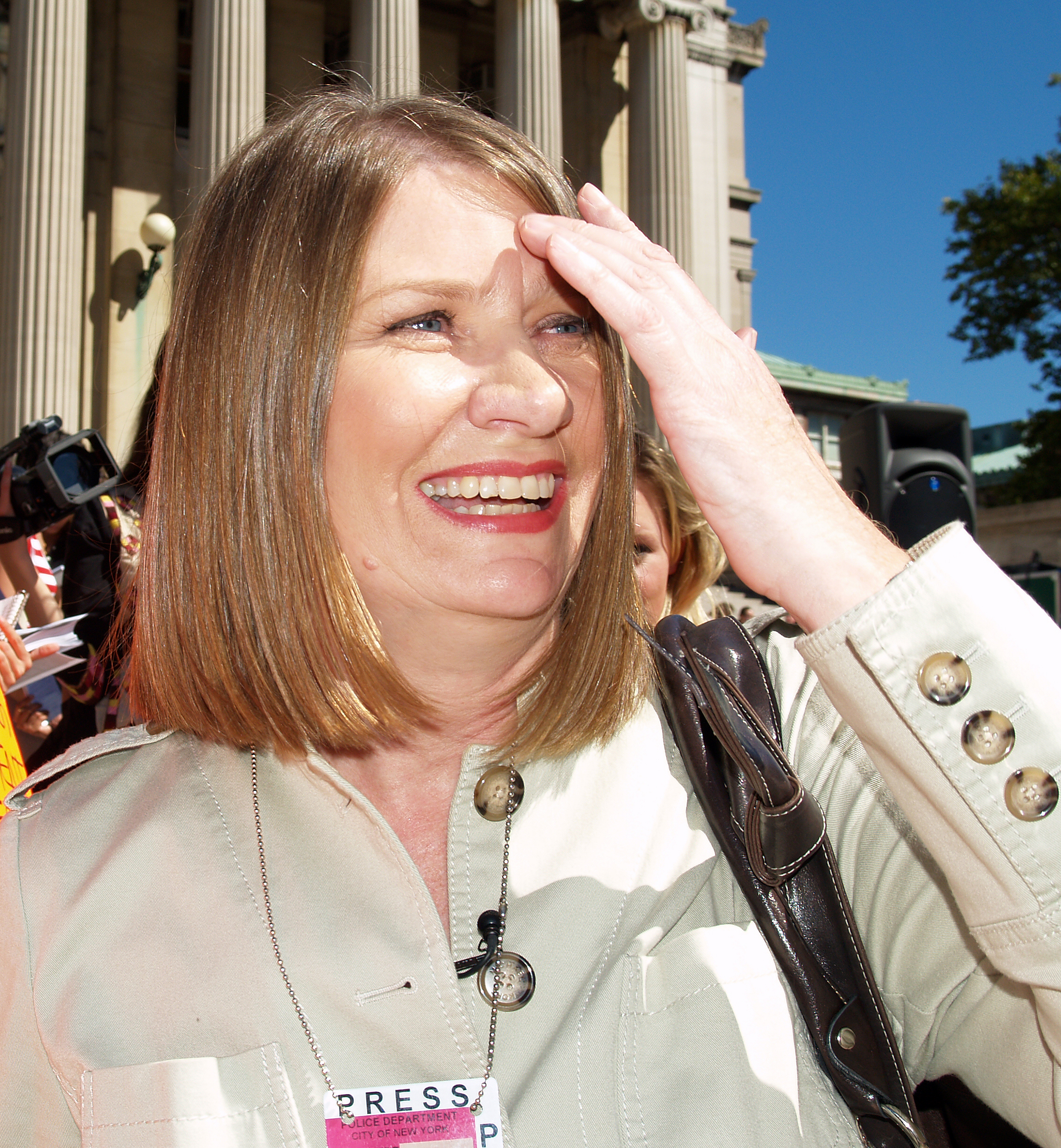
- Moos in 2007
- Born: May 21, 1950; Pittsburgh, Pennsylvania, U.S.
- Education: Syracuse University
- Occupations: CNN reporter (1981–2024); WPTZ correspondent (1976–1981)
- Notable credit(s): Moost Unusual, Making The MOOSt Of It (CNN) reporter (1995–2024)

Jeanne Moos (born May 21, 1950) is an American retired national news correspondent for CNN. She was based at the network's studios in Manhattan.

== Biography ==
A native of Pittsburgh, Pennsylvania, Moos originally wanted to pursue a career in print journalism, but while attending the S.I. Newhouse School of Public Communications at Syracuse University (where she earned a bachelor's degree in TV-Radio), she decided to go into the television business instead. In 1976, she landed her first major job in television at WPTZ in Plattsburgh, New York, as the station's first female correspondent. During her tenure at WPTZ, she covered local and national stories, including the 1980 Winter Olympics in Lake Placid, New York.

In 1981, she joined CNN as a reporter. It was there that she covered stories ranging from political corruption to the United Nations during the 1991 Gulf War.

In the 1990s, Moos began to report on unusual and off-beat soft news stories, which is her current trademark. In 1995, she began a series of reports called "Making The MOOSt Of It". Moos continued to file reports for CNN in a segment called "Moost Unusual", seen during The Situation Room and until its cancellation in 2014, during Showbiz Tonight on CNN Headline News. These stories tend to focus on subjects related to popular culture and make use of man-on-the-street style interviews, shots of tabloid magazine headlines, and clips garnered from videos on YouTube, and TikTok. They also frequently take viewers behind the scenes, showing Moos placing prank calls from her office or cracking jokes with other employees in CNN's Manhattan studios.

Moos retired from CNN on June 29, 2024.

== Controversy ==
In April 2014, Moos apologized following CNN's airing of a segment titled "Man in thong: Eyes up here, Duchess!", which was deemed "insensitive" and "racist" by viewers. In the roughly two-minute video, Moos mocked New Zealand Maori culture including traditional dance, costume, a greeting ceremony, and the haka, which she described as "a cross between a Chippendales lap dance and the mating dance of an emu".

== See also ==
- Cable news in the United States
- New Yorkers in journalism
