= WJKS (FM) =

Coordinates: 44.5255°N 73.5187°W

- Keeseville, New York; United States
- Broadcast area: Burlington, Vermont; Plattsburgh, New York
- Frequency: 104.3 MHz
- Branding: Backroads 104.3

Programming
- Format: Classic country
- Affiliations: Premiere Networks

Ownership
- Owner: Jeffrey D. Shapiro; (Great Eastern Radio, LLC)
- Sister stations: WSNO-FM; WTNN; WWFK

History
- First air date: March 15, 1992
- Former call signs: WVFA (1991); WGLV (1991–2000); WWOD (2000–2012); WMXR (2012–2013); WMVY (2013–2014); WECM (2014–2015)
- Call sign meaning: "Kiss" (previous format)

Technical information
- Licensing authority: FCC
- Facility ID: 20606
- Class: C3
- ERP: 25,000 watts
- HAAT: 88 meters (289 ft)

Links
- Public license information: Public file; LMS
- Webcast: Listen live
- Website: www.backroads1043.com

WJKS (104.3 MHz) is a commercial FM radio station in the Champlain Valley of northern New England, in the United States. WJKS broadcasts a classic country radio format. The station is owned by Great Eastern Radio. WJKS serves the Burlington–Plattsburgh media market.

== History ==
WWOD's logo from 2004 through 2012

Before it went on the air, the station first took the call sign WVFA on May 3, 1991, and changed to WGLV on June 14, 1991. It officially launched on March 15, 1992, with a religious format in Hartford, Vermont. On October 11, 2000, the station launched its WWOD call letters and changed its format to oldies as "Oldies 104.3".

In 2008, the station was granted a U.S. Federal Communications Commission (FCC) construction permit to change its city of license from Hartford, Vermont, to Keeseville, New York, increasing its effective radiated power (ERP) to 25,000 watts and decreasing its tower's height above average terrain (HAAT) to 88 meters (289 feet), using a directional antenna located in Au Sable, New York.

On May 22, 2012, WWOD, along with 28 other Nassau Broadcasting stations in Northern New England, was purchased at bankruptcy auction by Carlisle Capital Corporation, a company controlled by Bill Binnie (owner of WBIN-TV in Derry). WWOD and 11 of the other stations, were then acquire by Vertical Capital Partners, controlled by Jeff Shapiro. As this would put Shapiro over the Federal Communications Commission's ownership limits in the Lebanon-Rutland-White River Junction market, WWOD and WEXP were acquired by Electromagnetic Company, a company controlled by William and Gail Goddard. This transaction was consummated on November 30, 2012, with the WWOD/WEXP portion of the purchase valued at $600,000.

On November 30, 2012, WWOD went silent and swapped call signs with WMXR in Woodstock, Vermont. On July 9, 2013, the call letters were again changed, to WMVY. WMVY returned to the air on October 30, 2013, still operating from the Hartford facility. The call letters became WECM on June 9, 2014.

On November 10, 2014, WECM began transmitting from its new Keeseville facilities stunting with Christmas music, branded as "Ho Ho 104". After the holiday season, the station continued to run the stunt.

Electromagnetic Company sold WECM to Jeffrey D. Shapiro's Great Eastern Radio, LLC in a transaction that was consummated on March 23, 2015. Electromagnetic received a 6.4% equity interest in Great Eastern Radio (valued at $250,000) in exchange.

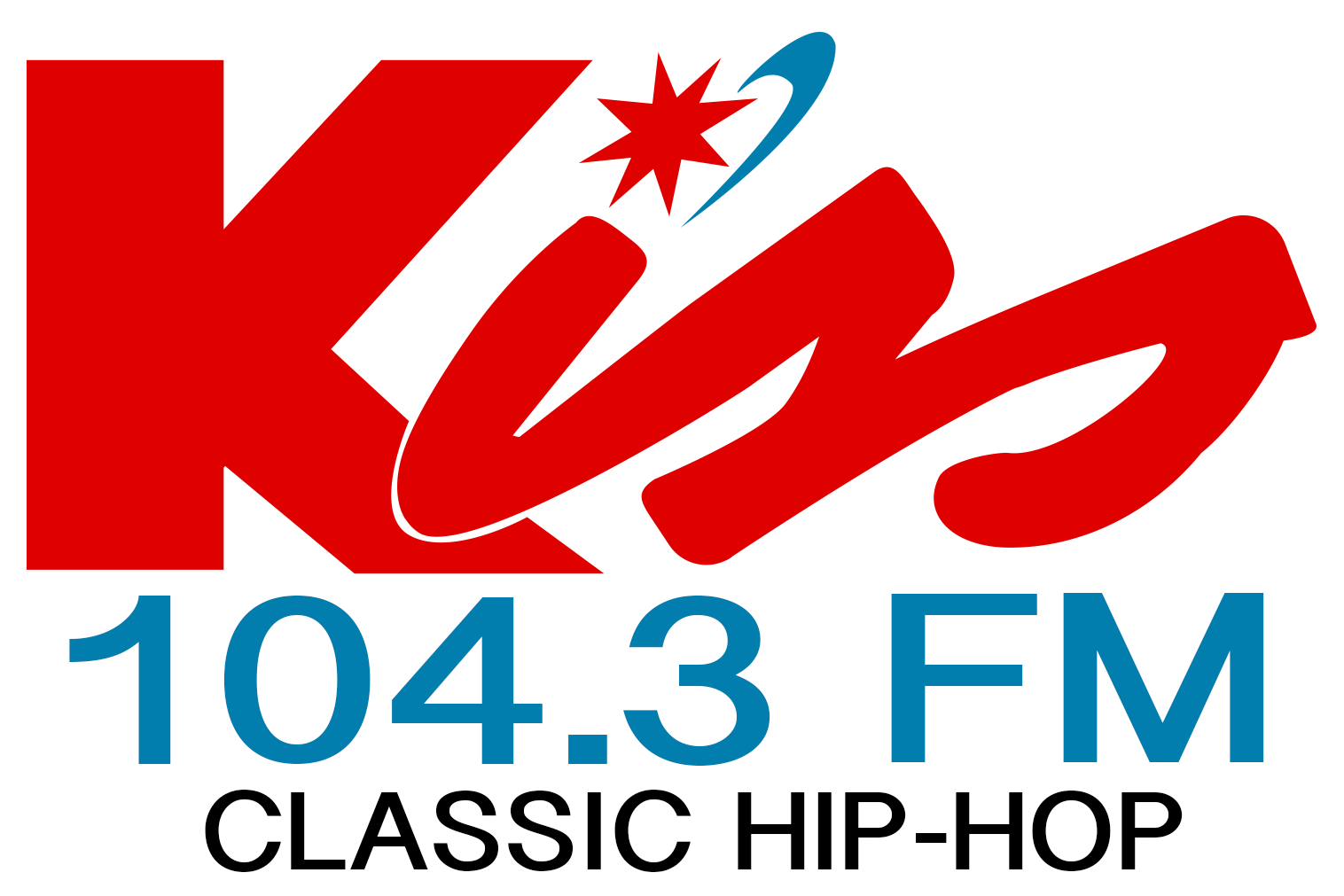
Logo as "Kiss 104.3"

On June 15, 2015, at noon, after seven months of stunting, the station finally flipped to classic hip hop as "Kiss 104.3", with the new call sign WJKS. On June 15, 2020, WJKS replaced the classic hip hop format with a simulcast of WWFY (100.9 FM), a co-owned country music station in Berlin, Vermont, under the "Froggy 104.3 & 100.9" branding.

On July 1, 2026, WJKS dropped its simulcast with WWFY–which had become redundant after Great Eastern Radio acquired WTNN–and began simulcasting "Froggy" on that station–and launched a classic country format, branded as "Backroads 104.3".
