= WRLH (New Hampshire) =

Television station in West Lebanon, New Hampshire (1966–1974)

West Lebanon, New Hampshire; United States
- Channels: Analog: 31 (UHF)

Programming
- Affiliations: NBC

Ownership
- Owner: Upper Valley Television Broadcasting Co.

History
- First air date: September 1966 (Note: The Television Factbook lists September 26.)
- Last air date: March 28, 1974
- Call sign meaning: White River, Lebanon and Hanover

Technical information
- ERP: 10.48 kW
- HAAT: 82 m (270 ft)
- Transmitter coordinates: 43°39′19″N 72°17′43″W

WRLH (channel 31) was a television station licensed to West Lebanon, New Hampshire, United States. It broadcast from 1966 to 1968 and again from 1971 to 1974 as an affiliate of NBC. Financial and technical woes sank the station twice.

== History ==
In June 1965, Upper Valley Television Broadcasters, Inc., was approved by the Federal Communications Commission to construct a new television station. The year before, Upper Valley's application specified channel 49, but successive national overhauls of the table of UHF television channel allotments moved the station to channel 57 by the time a permit had been approved and construction began for the station atop Crafts Hill. By August, the call letters WRLH (for White River, Lebanon, and Hanover) had been selected, and an affiliation with NBC had been announced. However, a second frequency change ordered by the FCC, to channel 31, held back completion of the facility by months because some equipment was custom-made for stations on a specific channel. Final designation of channel 31 for WRLH came in June 1966, allowing construction to be completed.

WRLH finally went on air on September 10, 1966, with studios atop Crafts Hill at the transmitter site and business offices in West Lebanon, New Hampshire. Through its first stint on air, it struggled. The problems were out of the gate, and they began weeks before startup when the station's original source of network programming, WRLP of Greenfield, Massachusetts, lost its transmitter tower at Gun Hill near Winchester, New Hampshire, when an airplane crashed into it and damaged the tower to the point where it had to be taken down. The station was off the air for weeks at a time because of its inability to reliably receive NBC shows. Trouble with network program reception led the station to invest in microwave equipment to improve picture quality. However, it was on the air less than two years, ceasing to broadcast on August 23, 1968.

In 1969, the FCC granted a transfer of control of the dormant station to Johnson and Whitman Communications, whose stockholders owned 50 percent of a commercial printing firm in Canaan, New Hampshire. The Johnson was William R. Johnson, a Republican state lawmaker from Hanover who was an advisor to Governor Walter R. Peterson Jr. and called WRLH "a profit-making station that makes no profit". However, the sale to Johnson and Whitman failed to close after Johnson was named a superior court judge, and in 1970, the station was sold to two parties: Sconnix Radio Enterprises (owned by Scott McQueen and Ted Nixon and owner of WCVR in Randolph, Vermont) and two attorneys from Lebanon. It returned to the air on August 3, 1971, again as an NBC affiliate.

In 1973, the other owners ousted McQueen and Nixon as managers, and they soon sold their stock back to the attorneys, William Baker and Ridler Page. Facing mounting losses and continued technical issues, Baker and Page took WRLH off the air on March 28, 1974. An editorial in the Valley News declared that WRLH had been dying since its first moment on air. On September 23, 1975, a public auction ordered by a bank sounded WRLH's final "death knell" and served as a "daylong requiem" for the venture as the station's equipment was sold in parts to the highest bidder. The tower on Crafts Hill went for $150 to a company seeking to start a paging service. From a reported $200,000 in debt, creditors were still owed $50,000, including several employees.

Channel 31 in the region was reused beginning in 1978 by WNNE, nominally licensed to nearby Hartford, Vermont.
