= Birch ratings =

American media audience measurement service

Birch Radio Ratings and BIrch/Scarborough Research, founded by Tom Birch, was a United States media audience measurement service that was founded in 1978 and grew internally and through acquisitions in the 1980s and grew to be a major challenger to once-dominant Arbitron.

== History ==
Also known as Birch ratings, Birch Radio ultimately employed more than 1,200 people nationwide and, together with its Birch Radio/Canada subsidiary, had sales offices in New York, Chicago, Los Angeles, Dallas, Atlanta, Toronto and Montreal. At its peak, Birch Radio interviewed more than 100,000 persons per month and included among its subscribers major advertisers such as McDonalds, Anheuser-Busch, Delta Air Lines, Coca Cola and Pepsi Cola, major advertising agencies such as BBDO/New York, Ogilvy & Mather, Foote Cone & Belding, BDA/BBDO/Atlanta and Tracey-Locke/Dallas. Birch broadcast subscribers included CBS, ABC, Clear Channel, Bonneville and hundreds of smaller broadcast groups.

Birch Radio was sold in 1987 to Dutch publishing conglomerate (and ultimate acquirer of the Nielsen television rating service) VNU; the company was merged with VNU subsidiary Scarborough Research. Birch Radio's founder, radio industry veteran Tom Birch, became chairman and CEO of the merged Birch/Scarborough entity until his departure in 1990 to form Opus Media Group; Scarborough Research continued to use that name.

In December 1992, two years after Birch's departure, VNU sold a 50% interest in Scarborough to Arbitron and shuttered the Birch Radio ratings service. Scarborough continues today as the leading provider of local television, radio and newspaper qualitative and shopping behavior information.

Founder Tom Birch subsequently joined Birch/Scarborough executives Bill Engel and Bill Livek as Chief Financial Officer of Simmons Market Research Bureau in 2001. Birch renegotiated corporate debt and key supplier agreements, enabling the company to achieve a two million dollar profit in 2002 following a five million dollar loss in the year prior to his joining the company. Simmons was profitably sold to Experian following his departure in 2003.

Birch is presently Owner/CEO of Lakes Media LLC, the owner of six radio stations in Southern Virginia and Northern North Carolina, partner in leading radio/television/tower broker Media Services Group and board member of Auddia, Inc NASD:AUUD.
