= WLPW =

- Lake Placid, New York; United States
- Frequency: 105.5 MHz
- Branding: Adirondack 105

Programming
- Format: Mainstream rock
- Affiliations: United Stations Radio Networks

Ownership
- Owner: Jonathan Becker and Gregory Gallacher; (North Country Radio Corp.)
- Sister stations: WRGR; WSLP; WVSL

History
- First air date: October 1979

Technical information
- Licensing authority: FCC
- Facility ID: 54653
- Class: C3
- ERP: 7,100 watts
- HAAT: −55 meters (−180 ft)
- Transmitter coordinates: 44°15′43.2″N 74°1′20.5″W

Links
- Public license information: Public file; LMS
- Webcast: Listen live
- Website: adirondack105.com

WLPW (105.5 FM) is a radio station licensed to serve Lake Placid, New York, United States. Established in 1979, the station is owned by Jonathan Becker and Gregory Gallacher, through licensee North Country Radio Corp.

WLPW formerly broadcast a classic rock format branded as "Rock 105", which was simulcast with WRGR (102.1 FM) in Tupper Lake, New York; the stations subsequently began to simulcast sister station WNBZ-FM. WLPW went silent in June 2017 after the station stopped paying rent on the tower it had broadcast from. In November 2017, as part of its acquisition of WNBZ in Saranac Lake, North Country Radio, owner of WSLP, obtained a right of first refusal to buy WLPW for $25,000 within thirty days of the station returning to the air.

On March 9, 2018, the FCC granted the application to transfer the license and ownership from Radio Lake Placid, Inc. to North Country Radio. The transfer was consummated on March 15, 2018, at a price of $32,500.
