= WNNE =

Television station in Montpelier, Vermont

- Montpelier–Burlington, Vermont; Plattsburgh, New York; United States
- City: Montpelier, Vermont (Note: Originally licensed to Hartford, Vermont; moved to Montpelier in 2018.)
- Channels: Digital: 14 (UHF), shared with WPTZ; Virtual: 31
- Branding: The Valley CW

Programming
- Affiliations: The CW

Ownership
- Owner: Hearst Television; (Hearst Stations Inc.)
- Sister stations: WPTZ

History
- First air date: September 27, 1978
- Former call signs: WMVW (CP, 1977–1978)
- Former channel numbers: Analog: 31 (UHF, 1978–2009); Digital: 25 (UHF, 2005–2018); Virtual: 5.2 (2018); Translator: W65AM Lebanon, NH
- Former affiliations: NBC (1978–2018; semi-satellite of WPTZ after 1990)
- Call sign meaning: Northern New England

Technical information
- Licensing authority: FCC
- Facility ID: 73344
- ERP: 650 kW
- HAAT: 845 m (2,772 ft)
- Transmitter coordinates: 44°31′32.1″N 72°48′56.4″W

Links
- Public license information: Public file; LMS

WNNE (channel 31), branded as The Valley CW, is a television station licensed to Montpelier, Vermont, United States, serving the Burlington, Vermont–Plattsburgh, New York market as an affiliate of The CW. It is owned by Hearst Television alongside Plattsburgh-licensed NBC affiliate WPTZ (channel 5). WNNE and WPTZ share studios on Community Drive in South Burlington, Vermont, with a secondary studio and news bureau on Cornelia Street in Plattsburgh; through a channel sharing agreement, the two stations transmit using WPTZ's spectrum from an antenna on Vermont's highest peak, Mount Mansfield.

== History ==
The channel 31 allocation in the Upper Valley was first occupied by WRLH in West Lebanon, New Hampshire, an NBC affiliate which operated from 1966 to 1968 and from 1971 to 1974.

The Taft Broadcasting Corporation, the same company who founded KGUL-TV in Galveston, Texas (now KHOU in Houston), but unrelated to the larger Taft Broadcasting Company of Cincinnati, obtained a permit for a new channel 31 that was by then reallocated to Hartford, Vermont, in 1977. Initially, this new television station was assigned the call letters WMVW but went on the air September 27, 1978, as WNNE from its facility in White River Junction. The station was granted a waiver by the Federal Communications Commission (FCC) to identify as "Hartford–Hanover" in 1980.

For its first twelve years, WNNE was a full-fledged station running its own syndicated lineup as well as network programming from NBC. On December 17, 1990, Heritage Media (then-owner of WPTZ) bought WNNE and turned it into a semi-satellite of WPTZ. For a time, most programming still originated out of WNNE, but certain shows were relayed from Plattsburgh through a new microwave relay system. In 2000, WPTZ moved WNNE's master control to its studios in Plattsburgh. This move would be followed by WNNE's website being integrated into a separate section of WPTZ's website in July 2001. On some cable systems in Central Vermont (such as Charter Communications systems serving Barre, St. Johnsbury and Chelsea; and Comcast in Rutland), both WPTZ and WNNE were carried even though the two stations' schedules were identical.

On July 20, 2005, WNNE began broadcasting a standard definition digital signal on UHF channel 25 from a transmitter on WVTA's nearby tower on Mount Ascutney. WNNE did not carry any of the additional digital subchannels that were carried by WPTZ, including NBC Weather Plus (despite this, weather graphics seen on the stations' newscasts carried the "NewsChannel 5 & 31 Weather Plus" branding), This TV, MeTV, or The CW, though Comcast carried WPTZ's subchannels in the Upper Valley.

During the analog era and some of the digital-only broadcasting period, WNNE operated a repeater, W65AM, on channel 65 in Lebanon. W65AM had a transmitter west of Lebanon on Crafts Hill. W65AM had its license cancelled by the FCC on March 19, 2010. This translator was within reach of a former analog repeater operated by Portland sister station WMTW, W27CP (channel 27) in White River Junction, which was established in 2005 after WMTW moved its main transmitter from Mount Washington closer to the Greater Portland area in Maine. That signal had a transmitter located in Lebanon's Mascoma section. FCC regulations did not allow two or more stations from two or more different markets to have coverage in the same location (in this case, White River Junction); this rule did not apply to repeaters, so WMTW's translator was allowed to operate. Hearst sold W27CP to New Hampshire Public Television in 2009 after taking it silent following the loss of its lease of the transmitter site.

On August 2, 2016, WNNE quietly dropped its "Channel 31" branding and logo and began to use WPTZ's "NBC 5" branding and logo with no separate branding, and the WNNE call sign was only mentioned during WPTZ's legal IDs. However, it still aired separate commercials.

=== Spectrum sale and channel sharing agreement ===
In the FCC's incentive auction, WNNE sold its spectrum for $50,464,592 and announced that it would enter into a post-auction channel sharing agreement. WNNE began to channel-share with sister station WPTZ; as the latter station's signal did not sufficiently reach Hartford, WNNE changed its city of license to Montpelier, Vermont. The station shut down operations on its pre-auction channel and commenced channel-sharing operations, effective July 22, 2018; on July 20, Hearst Television announced that WNNE would become the market's CW affiliate following the move. This was done by re-numbering that station's former WPTZ subchannel on 5.2 to WNNE's 31.1 virtual channel. This resolved concerns raised years before regarding a lack of access to the WPTZ subchannels for WNNE viewers, yet it also limited viewers in the Upper Valley to cable and satellite viewing options for NBC programming.

In August 2019, Hearst Television upgraded WNNE to the 1080i full HD picture format; prior to this upgrade, programming on this station was being presented in 720p.

=== 2019 antenna fire ===
On November 19, 2019, WNNE, WPTZ and CBS affiliate WCAX-TV (channel 3) were knocked off the air by a fire of their combined antenna at their transmitter facility. The cause of the fire was unknown. The outage affected over-the-air and satellite viewers; cable subscribers continued to receive the three stations via direct fiber feeds.

== News operation ==
Throughout the 1980s and 1990s, WNNE operated a fairly large news department for a station of its size. The original anchor team consisted of Mike Harding with news, John Yacavone providing weather, and sports from Rick Karle. On-air personnel routinely performed multiple tasks often shooting, editing, and producing their entire stories for air. During the week, the station offered local news and weather updates from 7 to 9 a.m. at 25 and 55 minutes past the hour during Today on weekday mornings in lieu of a traditional broadcast.

Full newscasts aired weekdays at noon as well as weeknights at 6 and 11 p.m. In addition, there were also prime time weather forecast cut-ins provided during network programming. However, it did not produce any weekend news shows. All newscasts aired out of WNNE's studios in the basement of the Pines Motel that later became a Regency Inn & Suites property.

In the mid-1980s, NBC wanted satellite truck coverage in the Northeastern United States, particularly New England. Due to WNNE's central location, it was considered a perfect fit and a new satellite vehicle partially funded by the network was stationed at the station's White River Junction studios. WNNE also maintained its own satellite truck that assisted in local news-gathering efforts in the Upper Valley and the surrounding areas. In the mid-1990s, both satellite trucks including the network-owned vehicle were acquired by WPTZ. The latter actually remained in service with a WPTZ logo until 2003.

After being acquired by Heritage Media in 1990, WNNE's local operations were significantly cut back. This eventually culminated in the cancellation of the station's newscasts in June 2001. By then, it had eliminated the weekday morning and weekday noon newscasts with the station simulcasting only the 6 a.m. hour of WPTZ's morning show and Today cut-ins. WNNE's noon show would be replaced with an infomercial. After dropping full separate local broadcasts on weeknights, the station began inserting updates originating from its White River Junction studios during the WPTZ news simulcasts. There were also separate Upper Valley-specific weather forecasts provided. To further establish a link between WNNE and WPTZ, the microwave link between the two was upgraded in order to allow live news coverage from WNNE to air on WPTZ. This move also allowed WPTZ's reports from Montpelier and New York state to be seen on WNNE.

In 2007, the weeknight news updates were dropped as well. Afterward, WNNE functioned as WPTZ's "Upper Valley Newsroom" and was referred to as such during all newscasts. Following this change, there was only a separate title opening that remained indicating WNNE was ever a separate station. Eventually, the news opening was dropped as well. Previously, during all local news programming, the station superimposed its channel 31 logo over the channel 5 logo in the right hand corner of the screen. On occasion when WNNE had technical problems, WPTZ's logo peeked through. Contributions by WNNE to WPTZ's newscasts included video footage and a live headline (weeknights at 5:30 p.m.) from its White River Junction studios (which was staffed with a full-time multimedia journalist). In addition to the Upper Valley and another Vermont bureau in Colchester covering Burlington, WPTZ also aired national news from a Washington, D.C., bureau operated by Hearst. It employed several reporters who gave live reports to the various company-owned affiliates.

Despite including "HD" in its logo, all newscasts were aired in pillarboxed 4:3 standard definition until April 26, 2011, when WPTZ finally upgraded to 16:9 enhanced definition widescreen. Although not truly high definition, broadcasts matched the aspect ratio of HD television screens. That station was one of six remaining outlets owned by Hearst that had yet to make the upgrade to local news in enhanced definition or full HD-level. For a period of time thereafter, the simulcasts on WNNE remained in pillarboxed 4:3 due to lack of a high definition-capable master control for WNNE at WPTZ's studios in Plattsburgh. This was also upgraded as well.

On August 2, 2016, after WPTZ rebranded to "NBC 5", WNNE stopped superimposing the channel 31 logo and began using the "NBC 5" logo during all of its local news programming. Upon the channel share and transfer of the CW affiliation from WPTZ-DT2, WNNE now carried WPTZ's 10 p.m. prime time newscast, a half-hour program simulcast on WPTZ's MeTV subchannel.

In August 2018, WPTZ's Upper Valley bureau moved from White River Junction to a new space on Mechanic Street in Lebanon, New Hampshire. In July 2019, WPTZ's Vermont facilities moved from Colchester to a new facility in South Burlington; production of the station's newscasts were concurrently relocated to the new facility from the Plattsburgh studio, which remained as a secondary facility.

=== Notable former on-air staff ===
- Tom Caron – sports anchor
- Brett Haber – sports anchor

== Technical information ==
=== Subchannels ===
Subchannels of WPTZ and WNNE
License	Channel	Res.	Short name	Programming
WPTZ	5.1	1080i	WPTZ-HD	NBC
WPTZ	5.2	480i	Story	Story Television
WPTZ	5.3	480i	Me TV	MeTV
WPTZ	5.4	480i	IONPLUS	Ion Plus
WPTZ	5.5	480i	QVC	QVC
WNNE	31.1	1080i	WNNE-HD	The CW Plus

=== Analog-to-digital conversion ===
WNNE ended regular programming on its analog signal, over UHF channel 31, on February 17, 2009, the original target date on which full-power television stations in the United States were to transition from analog to digital broadcasts under federal mandate (which was later pushed back to June 12, 2009). The station's digital signal remained on its pre-transition UHF channel 25, using virtual channel 31.
