= Scarborough Research =

Scarborough is a United States–based market research company that measures shopping patterns, media usage across platforms, and lifestyle trends of adults. Specializing in local and national consumer research, Scarborough measures over 100 local markets in the United States. Scarborough is headquartered in New York City.

== Company ==
Scarborough is a joint venture between The Nielsen Company and Arbitron. Scarborough began as a subsidiary of VNU and was merged with Birch Radio in 1987. VNU then sold 50% of interest in Scarborough to Arbitron in 1992. VNU was renamed as the Nielsen Company in 2007.

Scarborough's major services include:

- Local market studies in over 100 markets.
- A multiple market study that combines data from the local markets measured into one database.
- A national consumer study.
- Newspaper audience ratings for print readership, website audience, and the integrated or total audience (print and online) for newspapers across the U.S.
- Hispanic consumer research.
- Analytics and custom research using internet panels, re-contact studies, segmentation analysis, and branding studies.
- The ability for clients to combine select Top-Tier Local Market Studies into one database.
- Marketing data on sports fans, teams, and leagues.
- Customized research about kids, teens, and their parents.
- Customized research reports, presentation, and analyses.

== Methods ==
Scarborough uses a 3-part survey with over 210,000 respondents. Industries served include print, digital, radio, broadcast TV, cable TV, out of home, agency and sports marketing. Scarborough’s Top-Tier Local Market Studies, newspaper audience ratings, and multiple market and national studies are accredited by the Media Rating Council (MRC).

As of 2013, Scarborough research interviewers were not empowered to remove contacted individuals from their lists on request, citing privacy concerns, leading to complaints from an antagonized pool of potential respondents. In Q4 of 2015, that policy was changed.

== Scarborough Sports Marketing ==
Scarborough Sports Marketing is the Sports division of the overall brand of Scarborough. This division measures purchasing habits of sports fans for teams, leagues, marketers and media professionals. The data gathered by Scarborough is used by clients to learn more about and assist with corporate sponsorships, fan development, merchandising, promotion, competitive information, ticket sales, marketing, media selling, media placement and schedules. Scarborough’s studies are used to determine information on local and national markets throughout the United States.

== Sports categories measured ==
- Avidity/Level of interest by League or Sport
- Sporting Events attended by League, Sport or Team
- Number of Games attended in the past 12 months by League or Sport
- Sports Programs watched (TV, Radio, Cable) by League, Sport/Team/Event
- Currently Purchase/Interested in Season Tickets to Local Sports Team
- Sports Apparel bought by Team/League Logos
- Amount Willing to Spend for a Ticket by League
- Online Behaviors relating to Sports Logo Apparel, Fantasy Sports, Sporting Tickets, Sports Scores/Updates, and Major League Professional Team Websites

== See also ==
- Nielsen Company
- Arbitron
- Audience measurement
- Birch ratings
- Newspaper
- Consumer research
