= WSNO-FM =

- Au Sable, New York; United States
- Broadcast area: Plattsburgh, New York; Burlington, Vermont
- Frequency: 97.9 MHz
- Branding: 97.9 & 105.7 The Penguin

Programming
- Format: Adult contemporary

Ownership
- Owner: Great Eastern Radio, LLC
- Sister stations: WJKS; WWFK

History
- First air date: 2009
- Former call signs: WYME (2008–2009); WZXP (2009–2018); WLUP (2018); WXMS (2018–2022)
- Call sign meaning: "Snow" (taken from sister station WSNO)

Technical information
- Licensing authority: FCC
- Facility ID: 164249
- Class: C3
- ERP: 2,500 watts
- HAAT: 315 meters (1,033 ft)
- Transmitter coordinates: 44°34′28.3″N 73°40′27.4″W
- Translators: 105.7 W289CH (Barre, relays WWFY-HD2)
- Repeater: 100.9 WWFY-HD2 (Berlin)

Links
- Public license information: Public file; LMS
- Webcast: Listen live
- Website: www.thepenguinvermont.com

WSNO-FM (97.9 MHz, "97.9 & 105.7 The Penguin") is a radio station licensed to Au Sable, New York, and serving the Burlington-Plattsburgh-Lake Champlain radio market. The station is owned by Great Eastern Radio, LLC. WSNO-FM airs an adult contemporary radio format, simulcast on the second HD Radio channel of WWFY (100.9 FM) in Berlin and on translator station W289CH (105.7 FM) in Barre.

== History ==
The station was first licensed in early 2009 as WYME. At the outset, it did not offer programming on a regular schedule, and founding owner Radioactive, LLC had already put the station up for sale. The call sign was changed to WZXP on December 11, 2009; on July 23, 2010, the station signed on with an album-oriented rock/adult album alternative format programmed by Diane Desmond and Russ Kinsley, whose "Album Station" programming had been heard on WCLX until 2009.

On June 23, 2015, Radioactive, LLC filed a request with the Federal Communications Commission (FCC) for special temporary authority (STA) for WZXP to remain silent, stating that the station went off the air on June 19, 2015, due to the loss of its programming source. The request was granted by the FCC on July 9. As of July 15, 2015, Kinsley and Desmond were still producing their "Album Station" format online and noted on their website that the format would no longer be heard on 97.9 FM.

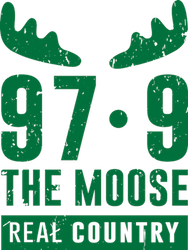
Logo from 2017 to 2021

On July 12, 2016, WZXP returned to the air with a classic country format as "97.9 The Moose". At that point, the station was operated by John Nichols, a co-founder of WXXX and WFFF-TV, and Aaron Ishmael. Ishmael's stations became part of Loud Media in 2020.

The call letters were changed to WLUP on March 19, 2018. The WLUP and WLUP-FM call signs were formerly used by Chicago radio station WCKL prior to its 2018 sale to the Educational Media Foundation by Merlin Media; that company's CEO, Randy Michaels, owns Radioactive, LLC. On April 3, 2018, Cumulus Media announced its acquisition of the WLUP call sign from Merlin Media as part of its purchase of another Chicago station, WKQX, with the intent of moving the call sign to a Cumulus-owned station; in June 2018, Cumulus applied to move the WLUP call letters to suburban Minneapolis, with the Au Sable station assuming new WXMS call letters. The change took effect on June 12, 2018.

On October 1, 2021, WXMS dropped the "Moose" classic country format and began stunting with Christmas music; the change took place after Great Eastern Radio, as part of a $99,999.99 purchase of the station from Radioactive, LLC, replaced Loud Media as WXMS' operator. On January 1, 2022, the station launched an adult hits format as "The Penguin", simulcast with Great Eastern Radio-owned WSNO in Barre; (Note: The Barre simulcast of "The Penguin" moved from WSNO (1450 AM) to the second HD Radio channel of WWFY in September 2023, continuing to feed translator W289CH (105.7 FM); the move was necessitated by the loss of the 1450 AM transmitter site.) the call sign was changed to WSNO-FM. All three of the initial members of WSNO's airstaff previously worked at WXXX. The sale to Great Eastern Radio was consummated on January 19, 2022.
