= WPTZ =

Television station in Plattsburgh, New York

- Plattsburgh, New York; Burlington, Vermont; United States
- City: Plattsburgh, New York (Note: Originally licensed to North Pole, New York; moved to Plattsburgh in 2011.)
- Channels: Digital: 14 (UHF), shared with WNNE; Virtual: 5
- Branding: NBC 5

Programming
- Affiliations: 5.1: NBC; for others, see § Subchannels

Ownership
- Owner: Hearst Television; (Hearst Stations Inc.)
- Sister stations: WNNE; WMUR-TV

History
- First air date: December 8, 1954
- Former call signs: WIRI (1954–1956)
- Former channel numbers: Analog: 5 (VHF, 1954–2009)
- Former affiliations: Both secondary: DuMont (1954–1955); ABC (1954–1968)
- Call sign meaning: "Plattsburgh"

Technical information
- Licensing authority: FCC
- Facility ID: 57476
- ERP: 650 kW
- HAAT: 845 m (2,772 ft)
- Transmitter coordinates: 44°31′32.1″N 72°48′56.4″W

Links
- Public license information: Public file; LMS
- Website: www.mynbc5.com

WPTZ (channel 5) is a television station licensed to Plattsburgh, New York, United States, serving as the NBC affiliate for the Burlington, Vermont–Plattsburgh, New York market. It is owned by Hearst Television alongside Montpelier, Vermont–licensed CW+ affiliate WNNE (channel 31). WPTZ and WNNE share studios on Community Drive in South Burlington, Vermont, with a secondary studio and news bureau on Cornelia Street in Plattsburgh. Through a channel sharing agreement, the two stations transmit using WPTZ's spectrum from an antenna on Vermont's highest peak, Mount Mansfield.

== History ==
=== Early years ===
The station signed on the air on December 8, 1954, as WIRI, originally licensed to the hamlet of North Pole, New York. It was owned by the Great Northern Broadcasting Company along with Plattsburgh's WIRY radio (1340 AM). The station's first studio facilities were located on Cornelia Street (Route 3) in Plattsburgh; the transmitter was located on Terry Mountain in Peru, New York. The station would have had the call letters WIRY-TV to match its radio sister, but at the time Federal Communications Commission (FCC) regulations did not allow two stations to share the same base call letters if they were licensed to different cities.

The station has been a primary NBC affiliate since its inception; it carried secondary affiliations with ABC until 1968 when WVNY (channel 22) signed on, and with DuMont until that network ceased operations in 1956.

=== Becoming WPTZ ===
Rollins Telecasting purchased channel 5 in 1956. The new owners changed the station's call letters to the present WPTZ (for Plattsburgh); the WPTZ call had recently been dropped by the channel 3 facility in Philadelphia (which is now CBS-owned KYW-TV) following its controversial trade by Westinghouse Broadcasting to NBC earlier in that year. Until September 1965, WPTZ was the only station in its market to broadcast network color programs. WPTZ's first studio color cameras were acquired in 1971. The station was granted authority to identify as "Plattsburgh–North Pole–Burlington" in 1968. In 1979, WPTZ relocated its studios to a new building located on Old Moffitt Road in Plattsburgh.

Rollins merged with Heritage Broadcasting in 1987 to form Heritage Media. In 1990, Heritage Media purchased Hartford, Vermont–based WNNE, which had been a separate station with its own news department. With Heritage's purchase, WNNE was made into a semi-satellite of WPTZ, significantly improving WPTZ's coverage in the southeastern part of the market. During the analog era, WPTZ was the only station in the market that did not operate any translators. WNNE's master control was transferred to WPTZ in 2000.

=== Ownership changes ===
Heritage sold all of its broadcasting properties to the Sinclair Broadcast Group in 1997 prior to its merger with News Corporation. The sale protected new Fox affiliate WFFF-TV, which was initially operated by WPTZ under a local marketing agreement (LMA) and shared the analog transmitter on Terry Mountain. Otherwise WPTZ/WNNE, along with then-sister stations in Pensacola, Florida, and Charleston, West Virginia, would have been forced to switch to Fox. Sinclair, in turn, sold WPTZ/WNNE along with the WFFF LMA to Sunrise Television in 1998. Sunrise then decided to swap WPTZ/WNNE, along with Smith Broadcasting-owned KSBW in Salinas, California, to what was then known as Hearst-Argyle Television in return for WNAC-TV in Providence, Rhode Island, and WDTN in Dayton, Ohio; both of those stations were forced to be divested by Hearst-Argyle due to significant signal overlap with WCVB-TV in Boston and WLWT in Cincinnati (the FCC did not allow common ownership of two stations with overlapping coverage areas until 2000). The swap became official on July 2, 1998. WFFF began operating as an independently owned and controlled station around the same time Hearst took over WPTZ/WNNE when the LMA with WPTZ was terminated.

WPTZ logo used from 2000 to 2016. An earlier variation of this logo was used between 1995 and 2000.

=== Relocating to Plattsburgh ===
On June 23, 1999, WPTZ petitioned the FCC to change its community of license (COL) from North Pole to Plattsburgh. The station cited the area's declining population as the reason for the change. The 2000 United States census did not even count North Pole as a separate community, instead folding it into Lake Placid. The community-of-license change was approved by the FCC on January 5, 2011. For some time before then, the station had dropped North Pole from its legal station identifications.

On July 9, 2012, WPTZ's parent company Hearst Television was involved in a dispute with Time Warner Cable, leading to WPTZ being pulled from Time Warner Cable and temporarily replaced with Nexstar Broadcasting Group station WBRE-TV of Wilkes-Barre, Pennsylvania; Time Warner opted for such a distant signal like WBRE, as they do not have the rights to carry any NBC affiliate closest to them. The substitution of WBRE in place of WPTZ lasted until July 19, 2012, when the deal was reached between Hearst and Time Warner.

On August 2, 2016, just before the Summer Olympics in Rio, WPTZ changed its logo and on-air branding from "NewsChannel 5" to "NBC 5", a rarity for Hearst, which prefers to brand their stations by call letters and channel numbers rather than their network affiliation.

=== Move to Vermont ===
On June 12, 2018, WPTZ announced it was moving to a brand new broadcast facility in South Burlington, Vermont, in a building that contains both a data center for Keurig Green Mountain and the main offices of Ben & Jerry's. The move took place in July 2019, when WPTZ began broadcasting newscasts in high definition. WPTZ continued to maintain the Television Drive facility for several months in Plattsburgh as a secondary studio, while closing a now-duplicative and smaller bureau in Colchester, Vermont. WPTZ later relocated the bureau to a new location at 308 Cornelia Street in Plattsburgh, taking over the former Glens Falls National Bank branch and renovating the building to become its new secondary studio in the summer of 2020.

==== 2019 antenna fire ====
On November 19, 2019, WPTZ, WNNE and CBS affiliate WCAX-TV (channel 3) were knocked off the air by a fire at their combined antenna at the transmitter facility. The cause of the fire was unknown. The outage affected over-the-air and satellite viewers; cable subscribers continued to receive the three stations via direct fiber feeds, while Vidéotron in Quebec temporarily replaced WPTZ with Detroit NBC affiliate WDIV-TV.

== WPTZ-DT2 ==
In September 2006, WPTZ established a daily web video forecast as part of a major revamping of its website. The feature, called "Weather Plus Update", introduced a logo showing WPTZ/WNNE offering NBC Weather Plus together as "5&31 Weather Plus". Starting in October, its studios in Plattsburgh underwent extensive renovations. During that time, its broadcasts were from a temporary set while the construction took place. While the studios as a whole were being upgraded, the weather department underwent the most change. In advance of the launch of NBC Weather Plus, the weather center was expanded to make room for new combined WPTZ/WNNE weather graphics and logos. The remodeling was completed by late-November.

WPTZ launched Weather Plus on a new second digital subchannel on November 15 after debuting a new digital signal from Mount Mansfield a day earlier. The service was never offered on WNNE's digital signal even though this had been airing since July 20, 2005. On digital cable, WPTZ-DT2 was carried on Comcast digital channel 169 (serving the Upper Valley), Telecom digital channel 305, and Time Warner Cable digital channel 854. It was never offered on legacy Charter systems in New York State.

In December 2008, NBC shut down the national Weather Plus service after its parent company, NBCUniversal, purchased The Weather Channel. WPTZ continued to air a locally derived version of Weather Plus until August 31, 2009, when it was replaced with This TV. This marked the network's first foray into the Plattsburgh and Burlington area along with St. Lawrence County in New York and eastern portions of the adjacent Watertown market where WPTZ has long served as the default NBC affiliate on cable. WPTZ-DT2 remained on the three digital cable systems (with a change on Comcast systems to channel 302) while being added to Charter digital channel 296. It was still not carried on a subchannel of WNNE. On January 2, 2013, This TV was replaced on 5.2 by its sister network, MeTV (Memorable Entertainment Television). Both networks were owned at the time by Weigel Broadcasting (Tribune Broadcasting has since taken over This TV).

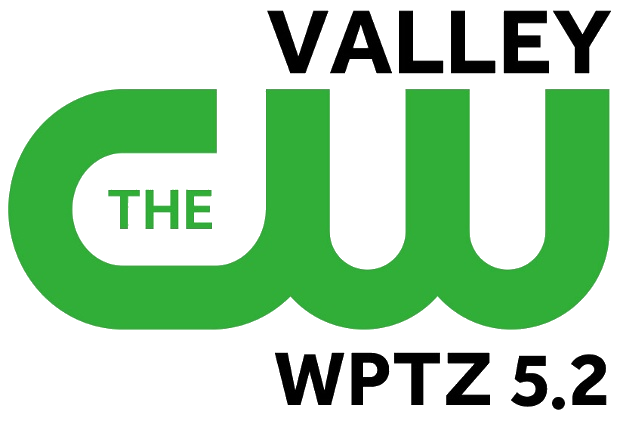
Logo for WPTZ-DT2, used from 2013 to 2018.

On March 4, 2013, WPTZ's second digital subchannel assumed the CW affiliation for the Plattsburgh–Burlington market from WFFF-DT2. It continued to air MeTV programming outside CW network slots until September 2014, when MeTV was separated into its own subchannel. While it airs The CW's schedule in-pattern, The Bill Cunningham Show, which aired weekdays at 3 p.m. on many CW affiliates until its cancellation in 2016, was delayed to 12:30 a.m. until the launch of a separate MeTV subchannel. Since the main WPTZ channel also serves as one of the default NBC affiliates for Massena, New York (along with WSTM-TV in Syracuse), that area now has access to two CW affiliates when Watertown's WWTI-DT2 is included. Despite adding The CW, there had been no plans made public about WPTZ's then semi-satellite WNNE adding the network in order to increase the broadcasting radius; however, the network was ultimately transferred over to WNNE, five years later, when it entered into a channel-sharing arrangement with WPTZ. Currently, access in the Upper Valley of Vermont and New Hampshire to WNNE and WPTZ-DT3 is solely through digital cable and satellite services.

On September 15, 2014, WPTZ separated The CW and MeTV into their own subchannels, 5.2 and 5.3 respectively, but did not add them to WNNE's signal. In April 2016, the over-the-air digital signal of WPTZ-DT2 was upgraded into 720p high definition; thus offering a high definition feed for The CW for the first time in the Burlington–Plattsburgh area (and the entire Champlain Valley and beyond) and a second high definition feed for The CW in Massena (the other being WWTI-DT2 of Watertown, which has been broadcasting its digital over-the-air signal in 720p high definition since August 17, 2012). In May 2016, Comcast began carrying WPTZ-DT2's high definition feed on digital channel 706 for Burlington (as well as Upper Connecticut River Valley) viewers and Charter began carrying WPTZ-DT2's high definition feed on digital channel 711 for Plattsburgh viewers.

On July 22, 2018, WNNE assumed the CW affiliation previously held by the 5.2 subchannel; this was a result of WNNE shutting down operations on its pre-auction channel and commencing channel-sharing operations, effective July 22, 2018. On July 20, Hearst Television announced that WNNE would become a CW affiliate following the move. Concurrent with the move, the 5.2 subchannel was remapped to WNNE's virtual channel 31.1 under channel-sharing operations. This resolves the concerns raised years before regarding a lack of access to the WPTZ sub-channels for WNNE viewers, yet it also limits viewers in the Upper Valley to cable and satellite viewing options for NBC programming.

== Programming ==
=== Past programming preemptions ===
In the 1980s and early 1990s, WPTZ preempted select NBC shows, including NBC News Overnight (due to the station signing off overnight), GO!, Hot Potato, The Match Game-Hollywood Squares Hour, Santa Barbara, Trialwatch, the 1990 version of Let's Make a Deal, and the Bob Goen version of Wheel of Fortune. NBC was far less tolerant of program preemptions during the entire timeframe where WPTZ preempted programming from that network, but was incredibly unlikely to remove the affiliation from a VHF station that otherwise was highly rated (and for the most part, most of the programs other than Santa Barbara did not air for more than a season).

=== News operation ===
For most of its history, WPTZ's newscasts have been a distant second in the ratings behind long-dominant WCAX-TV. Traditionally, it focused more on the North Country and New York State, while WCAX and WVNY/WFFF tend to cover more from Vermont. In order to cover that state, from the mid-1990s to July 2019, WPTZ operated secondary facilities known as the Vermont Bureau on Roosevelt Highway (US 2/US 7) in Colchester. At one point, there had been more general assignment reporters based at the main studios in Plattsburgh. However, in more recent times, additional reporters based at the Vermont Bureau have been hired.

Throughout the 1980s and 1990s, WNNE operated its own news department and aired local newscasts. This was progressively cut back after being bought by Heritage, eventually resulting in the elimination of a full news operation in 2007. Later, the only visual difference between the stations were different channel bugs during newscasts. Occasionally when WNNE had technical problems, WPTZ's logo peeked through.

In addition to the Upper Valley and Vermont bureaus, WPTZ airs national news from Hearst Television's Washington, D.C. bureau. It employs several reporters who give live reports to the various Hearst affiliates.

Although WPTZ and WNNE do not own or operate weather radars of their own, they use live NOAA National Weather Service radar data from several regional sites. It is presented on-screen in a forecasting system known as "First Alert Storm Tracker" (powered by the Super Doppler Network). With the departure of Thom Hallock (whose contract was not renewed by station) on November 23, 2007, WPTZ was left with an all-woman weeknight anchor team. That changed with the arrival of Gus Rosendale. He left WPTZ in 2005 to report at sister station WTAE-TV in Pittsburgh. George Mallet was hired to take his place shortly thereafter.

In August 2009, the station introduced a new format and title to its weeknight newscast at 11. The re-formatted show called NewsChannel 5 Nightcast features more fast-paced and edgier news. Despite its logo which includes "HD", the newscasts were aired in pillar-boxed 4:3 standard definition and it was the only station in the market to not have upgraded local news to high definition. WPTZ was one of six remaining stations owned by Hearst that has yet to make the upgrade to 16:9 enhanced definition widescreen or full HD, until on April 26, 2011, when WPTZ started airing newscasts in widescreen. However, unlike the newscasts on WCAX-TV and WFFF-TV/WVNY, the WPTZ newscasts at the time were not in true HD—just SD widescreen. In August 2013, WPTZ started airing the area's very first weekend morning news. NewsChannel 5 Today airs on Saturdays from 5 to 7 a.m. and on Sundays from 6 to 8 a.m. This beats WCAX-TV, which had previously announced that they would add weekend morning news.

In April 2014, the station announced they were going to revamp their set. After a few weeks of broadcasting from a temporary set put together in the newsroom, the new set debuted. The old set was completely removed and a new set was constructed by FX Group. The set was a major departure from their prior set, which debuted in 2006. One major change made was the elimination of the newsroom as the backdrop for the anchor desk. Also on September 29, 2014, WPTZ debuted a nightly 10 p.m. newscast which airs on both WNNE and WPTZ-DT3 simultaneously.

On June 20, 2016, WPTZ debuted a half-hour noon newscast, became the second television station in the Champlain Valley complete with a 10-minute newscast on WCAX-TV, coinciding with the cancellation of FABLife. On August 2, 2016, following the station rebrand itself as "NBC 5", the newscast branding was now named as NBC 5 News.

In August 2018, WPTZ's Upper Valley bureau moved from White River Junction to a new space on Mechanic Street in Lebanon, New Hampshire. On July 27, 2019, WPTZ's Vermont facilities moved from Colchester to South Burlington; the station's newscasts were concurrently relocated to the new facility from the Plattsburgh studio. To coincide with the aforementioned relocation to the new South Burlington facilities, WPTZ became the last station in the market to broadcast newscasts in high definition.

==== Notable former on-air-staff ====
- Jeanne Moos — became WPTZ's first female correspondent in 1976 (now reporter for CNN)
- Chris Ortloff (early-1980s; served in the New York State Assembly from 1986 until 2007; Ortloff pled guilty to felony charge of online enticement of minors on December 24, 2008, and was sentenced on April 23, 2009)

== In popular culture ==
The 2008 film Frozen River shows the characters Ray Eddy (Melissa Leo) and her son T. J. (Charlie McDermott) watching a nighttime WPTZ weather report of an incoming Canadian clipper system.

== Technical information ==
=== Subchannels ===
Subchannels of WPTZ and WNNE
License	Channel	Res.	Short name	Programming
WPTZ	5.1	1080i	WPTZ-HD	NBC
WPTZ	5.2	480i	Story	Story Television
WPTZ	5.3	480i	Me TV	MeTV
WPTZ	5.4	480i	IONPLUS	Ion Plus
WPTZ	5.5	480i	QVC	QVC
WNNE	31.1	1080i	WNNE-HD	The CW Plus

=== Analog-to-digital conversion ===
WPTZ shut down its analog signal, over VHF channel 5, on February 17, 2009, the original date on which full-power television stations in the United States were to transition from analog to digital broadcasts under federal mandate (which was later pushed back to June 12, 2009). The station's digital signal remained on its pre-transition UHF channel 14, using virtual channel 5. It was one of the first stations owned by Hearst to cease analog broadcasting (then-Hearst sister station KITV in Honolulu, Hawaii, was the other).

== Out-of-market and Canadian viewership ==
WPTZ previously served as the default NBC affiliate for northern areas of the nearby Watertown, New York, market (most notably Massena), while WSTM-TV in Syracuse served Watertown proper. Both WPTZ and WSTM-TV lost those statuses on December 1, 2016, when WVNC-LD signed on as the Watertown market's first full-time NBC affiliate.

Like the other network stations that serve Plattsburgh and Burlington, WPTZ has a large audience in southern Quebec, Canada. This includes Montreal, a city with ten times as many people as all of WPTZ's entire American viewing area. For many years, station promos and IDs have read "North Pole–Plattsburgh–Burlington–Montreal" or "Plattsburgh–Burlington–Montreal" to acknowledge its large cable viewership in Canada.

WPTZ is widely carried on cable in the province of Quebec as far north as Saguenay and as far east as Gaspé. In addition, Southern Quebec viewers can also pick up WPTZ's over-the-air signal with a well-placed antenna. The Canadian Radio-television and Telecommunications Commission (CRTC)'s simultaneous substitution rules mandate cable systems to replace WPTZ's signal with that of CFCF-DT, CKMI-DT, or CJNT-DT within their broadcasting areas when one of those stations is airing the same program at the same time as WPTZ.
