= Plattsburgh West, New York =

- Census-designated place
- Location in Clinton County and the state of New York.
- Coordinates: 44°40′50″N 73°30′9″W
- Country: United States
- State: New York
- County: Clinton
- Town: Plattsburgh

Area
  - Total: 1.95 sq mi (5.05 km^{2})
  - Land: 1.90 sq mi (4.91 km^{2})
  - Water: 0.054 sq mi (0.14 km^{2})
- Elevation: 323 ft (98 m)

Population (2020)
  - Total: 1,382
  - Density: 729/sq mi (281.6/km^{2})
- Time zone: UTC-5 (Eastern (EST))
  - Summer (DST): UTC-4 (EDT)
- ZIP Code: 12901 (Plattsburgh)
- FIPS code: 36-58601

Plattsburgh West is a census-designated place (CDP) and region of the town of Plattsburgh in Clinton County, New York, United States. As of the 2020 census, Plattsburgh West had a population of 1,382. The CDP lies to the west of the city of Plattsburgh.

== Geography ==
Plattsburgh West is located at 44°40′50″N 73°30′9″W (44.680513, -73.502626). It is bordered to the north by New York State Route 3, to the east by Interstate 87 (the Adirondack Northway), to the south by the Saranac River, and to the west by the former Clinton County Airport. Part of the southern border along the Saranac River is the municipal border between the towns of Plattsburgh and Schuyler Falls.

The area is served by Exit 37 of Interstate 87. The highway leads north 63 miles (101 km) to Montreal (via Quebec Autoroute 15), and south 158 miles (254 km) to Albany.

According to the United States Census Bureau, the CDP has a total area of 1.8 square miles (4.7 km^{2}), of which 1.8 square miles (4.6 km^{2}) is land and 0.04 square miles (0.1 km^{2}), or 3.00%, is water.

== Demographics ==
Historical population
Census	Pop.	Note	%±
2020	1,382		—
U.S. Decennial Census

In the census of 2000, there were 1,289 people, 499 households, and 349 families residing in the CDP. The population density was 733.9 inhabitants per square mile (283.4/km^{2}). There were 601 housing units at an average density of 342.2 per square mile (132.1/km^{2}). The racial makeup of the CDP was 95.81% White, 1.40% African American, 0.62% Native American, 0.62% Asian, 0.39% from other races, and 1.16% from two or more races. Hispanic or Latino of any race were 1.09% of the population.

There were 499 households, out of which 34.5% had children under the age of 18 living with them, 45.3% were married couples living together, 16.0% had a female householder with no husband present, and 29.9% were non-families. 21.2% of all households were made up of individuals, and 5.4% had someone living alone who was 65 years of age or older. The average household size was 2.58 and the average family size was 2.90.

In the CDP, the population was spread out, with 27.6% under the age of 18, 9.2% from 18 to 24, 30.5% from 25 to 44, 23.8% from 45 to 64, and 8.9% who were 65 years of age or older. The median age was 34 years. For every 100 females, there were 91.0 males. For every 100 females age 18 and over, there were 89.6 males.

The median income for a household in the CDP was $25,294, and the median income for a family was $24,797. Males had a median income of $23,145 versus $20,313 for females. The per capita income for the CDP was $11,810. About 24.0% of families and 25.9% of the population were below the poverty line, including 40.0% of those under age 18 and 11.4% of those age 65 or over.

== Education and Business ==
The CDP is served by the Beekmantown Central School District. Nearby higher education institutions include the State University of New York at Plattsburgh in the City of Plattsburgh and Clinton Community College in the Town of Plattsburgh.

The CDP borders the now-closed Clinton County Airport. CommutAir, a regional airline, had its headquarters in Plattsburgh West CDP on the site of the airport before they relocated to South Burlington, Vermont.
