= Ray Brook, New York =

Hamlet in New York, United States

Coordinates: 44°17′36″N 74°05′35″W

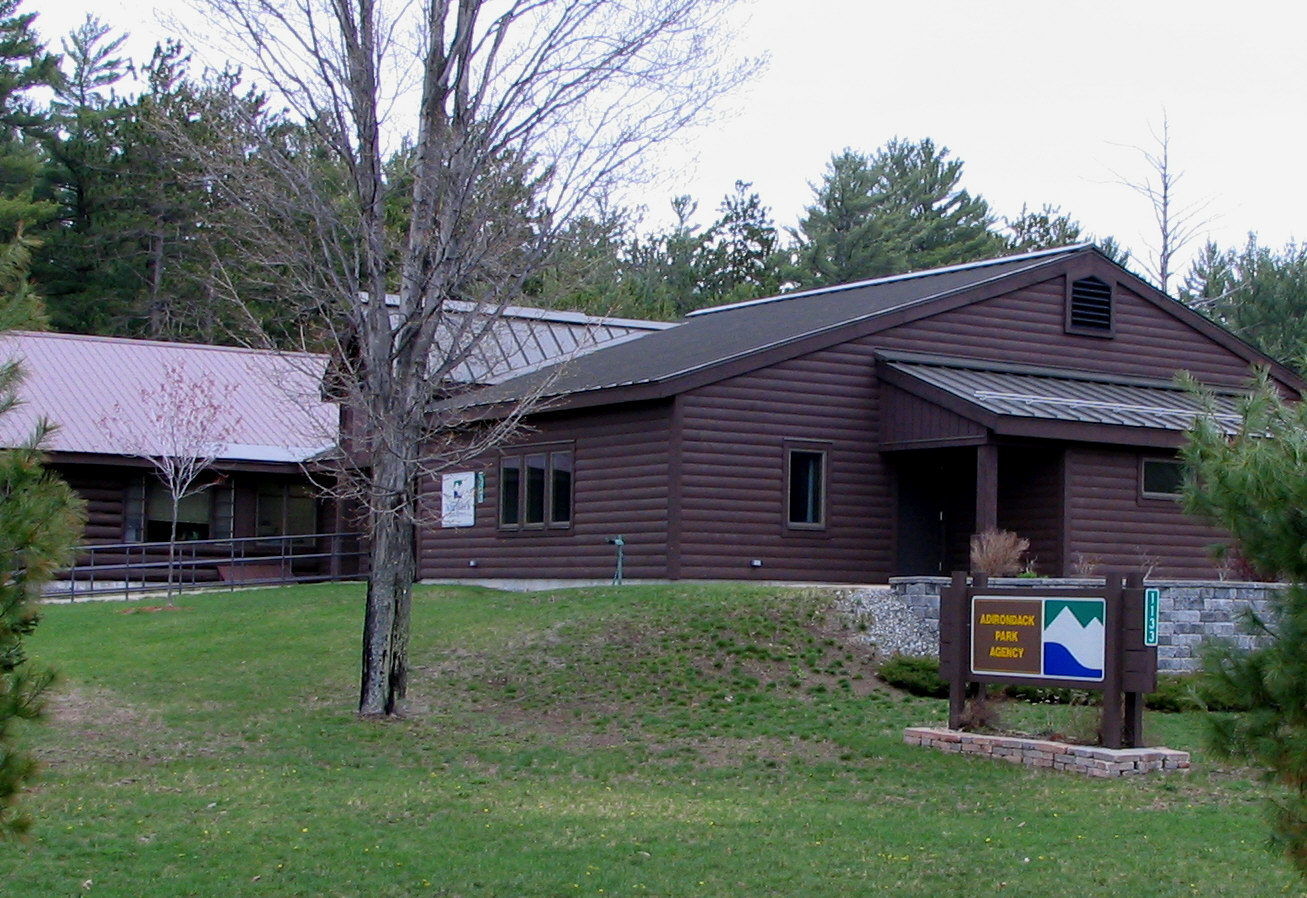
Adirondack Park Agency headquarters

Ray Brook is a hamlet in the U.S. state of New York, located on NY 86 between Saranac Lake and Lake Placid in the Town of North Elba in Essex County. The ZIP Code for Ray Brook is 12977.

In 1980, congressman Robert C. McEwen signed a contract to construct the Olympic Village for the 1980 Winter Olympics in Ray Brook with the goal of converting it into a federal prison after the games ended. The Federal Correctional Institution, Ray Brook became operational following the conclusion of the Olympics and accepted its first inmates that same year.

== Climate ==
Climate data for Ray Brook, New York, 1991–2020 normals, 1969–2004: 1620ft (494m)
Month	Jan	Feb	Mar	Apr	May	Jun	Jul	Aug	Sep	Oct	Nov	Dec	Year
Record high °F (°C)	61 (16)	60 (16)	79 (26)	89 (32)	89 (32)	93 (34)	93 (34)	96 (36)	93 (34)	79 (26)	69 (21)	61 (16)	96 (36)
Mean maximum °F (°C)	46.8 (8.2)	51.0 (10.6)	62.5 (16.9)	74.0 (23.3)	81.6 (27.6)	86.5 (30.3)	87.7 (30.9)	86.7 (30.4)	81.6 (27.6)	74.3 (23.5)	62.4 (16.9)	49.1 (9.5)	89.2 (31.8)
Mean daily maximum °F (°C)	23.3 (−4.8)	25.5 (−3.6)	34.2 (1.2)	47.7 (8.7)	61.0 (16.1)	69.6 (20.9)	74.4 (23.6)	72.4 (22.4)	65.5 (18.6)	52.2 (11.2)	39.8 (4.3)	27.4 (−2.6)	49.4 (9.7)
Daily mean °F (°C)	14.3 (−9.8)	15.3 (−9.3)	24.3 (−4.3)	37.6 (3.1)	50.2 (10.1)	59.4 (15.2)	63.7 (17.6)	61.9 (16.6)	54.9 (12.7)	43.9 (6.6)	32.9 (0.5)	21.0 (−6.1)	39.9 (4.4)
Mean daily minimum °F (°C)	5.3 (−14.8)	5.1 (−14.9)	14.3 (−9.8)	27.4 (−2.6)	39.4 (4.1)	49.1 (9.5)	53.0 (11.7)	51.3 (10.7)	44.3 (6.8)	35.7 (2.1)	26.1 (−3.3)	14.6 (−9.7)	30.5 (−0.8)
Mean minimum °F (°C)	−22.5 (−30.3)	−17.3 (−27.4)	−11.5 (−24.2)	11.8 (−11.2)	25.2 (−3.8)	32.5 (0.3)	39.4 (4.1)	36.5 (2.5)	27.6 (−2.4)	18.7 (−7.4)	5.8 (−14.6)	−13.7 (−25.4)	−25.3 (−31.8)
Record low °F (°C)	−35 (−37)	−34 (−37)	−26 (−32)	−6 (−21)	18 (−8)	26 (−3)	33 (1)	28 (−2)	22 (−6)	9 (−13)	−5 (−21)	−31 (−35)	−35 (−37)
Average precipitation inches (mm)	2.41 (61)	1.85 (47)	2.21 (56)	2.70 (69)	3.21 (82)	3.87 (98)	3.60 (91)	3.72 (94)	3.90 (99)	3.43 (87)	3.40 (86)	2.61 (66)	36.91 (936)
Average snowfall inches (cm)	25.8 (66)	19.8 (50)	18.5 (47)	9.5 (24)	0.8 (2.0)	0.0 (0.0)	0.0 (0.0)	0.0 (0.0)	0.1 (0.25)	1.5 (3.8)	14.4 (37)	21.8 (55)	112.2 (285.05)
Source 1: NOAA
Source 2: XMACIS2 (records, 1981-2003 monthly max/min & snowfall)
