= WNBZ-FM =

- Saranac, New York; United States
- Broadcast area: Plattsburgh, New York; Burlington, Vermont
- Frequency: 106.3 MHz
- RDS: NBZ-FM
- Branding: 106.3 NBZ-FM

Programming
- Format: Classic hits

Ownership
- Owner: William Dickerson; (NBZ, LLC)

History
- First air date: July 12, 1989
- Former call signs: WDGE (1985–1993); WSLK (1993–2000); WYZY (2000–2016)

Technical information
- Licensing authority: FCC
- Facility ID: 73315
- Class: C2
- ERP: 1,470 watts
- HAAT: 706 meters (2,316 ft)
- Transmitter coordinates: 44°41′43.2″N 73°52′58.5″W

Links
- Public license information: Public file; LMS
- Website: wnbz.com

WNBZ-FM (106.3 MHz) is a radio station airing a classic hits radio format, licensed to Saranac, New York, United States. The station is owned by William Dickerson, through NBZ, LLC. Its studios are located on Cornelia Street in Plattsburgh, New York.

As of June 2017, WNBZ-FM's programming was simulcast on WRGR (102.1 FM) in Tupper Lake; it has also simulcast with WNBZ (1240 AM) in Saranac Lake and WLPW (105.5 FM) in Lake Placid. As of November 2017, WNBZ-FM was the only one of Saranac Lake Radio's stations to remain on the air. That month, Saranac Lake Radio agreed to sell the station to NBZ, LLC for $300,000; under the terms of the deal, the new owners began programming WNBZ-FM under a local marketing agreement on December 1. The sale was consummated on August 6, 2018.

On January 1, 2024, after stunting on New Year's Eve with all-Rick Astley songs, WNBZ-FM relaunched its classic hits format as "106.3 NBZ-FM".
