= WVSL (AM) =

Simulcast of WLPW Lake Placid
- Saranac Lake, New York; United States
- Frequency: 1240 kHz
- Branding: Adirondack 105

Programming
- Format: Mainstream rock

Ownership
- Owner: Jonathan Becker and Gregory Gallacher; (North Country Radio Corp.)
- Sister stations: WRGR; WSLP; WLPW

History
- First air date: September 11, 1927
- Former call signs: WNBZ (1927–2018)
- Former frequencies: 1290 kHz (1927–1941); 1320 kHz (1941–1946); 1450 kHz (1946–1956)

Technical information
- Licensing authority: FCC
- Facility ID: 73314
- Class: C
- Power: 1,000 watts unlimited
- Transmitter coordinates: 44°18′58.2″N 74°7′6.6″W
- Translator: 95.3 W237EY (Saranac Lake)

Links
- Public license information: Public file; LMS
- Webcast: Listen live
- Website: adirondack105.com

WVSL (1240 AM) is a radio station licensed to serve Saranac Lake, New York. Established in 1927 as WNBZ, the station is owned by Jonathan Becker and Gregory Gallacher, through licensee North Country Radio Corp.

Logo as WNBZ

In June 2017, the Adirondack Daily Enterprise reported that WNBZ had been silent since at least 2016. The station had simulcast an adult contemporary format with WNBZ-FM (106.3). WNBZ's "Radio Park" studio and transmitter facility was put up for tax auction in November 2017. On November 22, 2017, Saranac Lake Radio, LLC filed to sell the station to North Country Radio, owner of WSLP (93.3 FM), for $6,000; the new owners would be required to change WNBZ's call sign, and also received a right of first refusal to purchase Lake Placid sister station WLPW (105.5 FM). Concurrently, the "Radio Park" properties were withdrawn from the Essex County tax auction list. North Country Radio's purchase of WNBZ was consummated on February 9, 2018, and the new owners changed the station's call sign to WVSL on February 28, 2018.

== Translator ==
Broadcast translator for WVSL
| Call sign | Frequency | City of license | FID | ERP (W) | Class | Transmitter coordinates | FCC info |
|---|---|---|---|---|---|---|---|
| W237EY | 95.3 FM | Saranac Lake, New York | 202111 | 250 | D | 44°20′25.1″N 74°7′42.5″W | LMS |
