= WWFK =

Simulcasts WRFK, Barre, Vermont
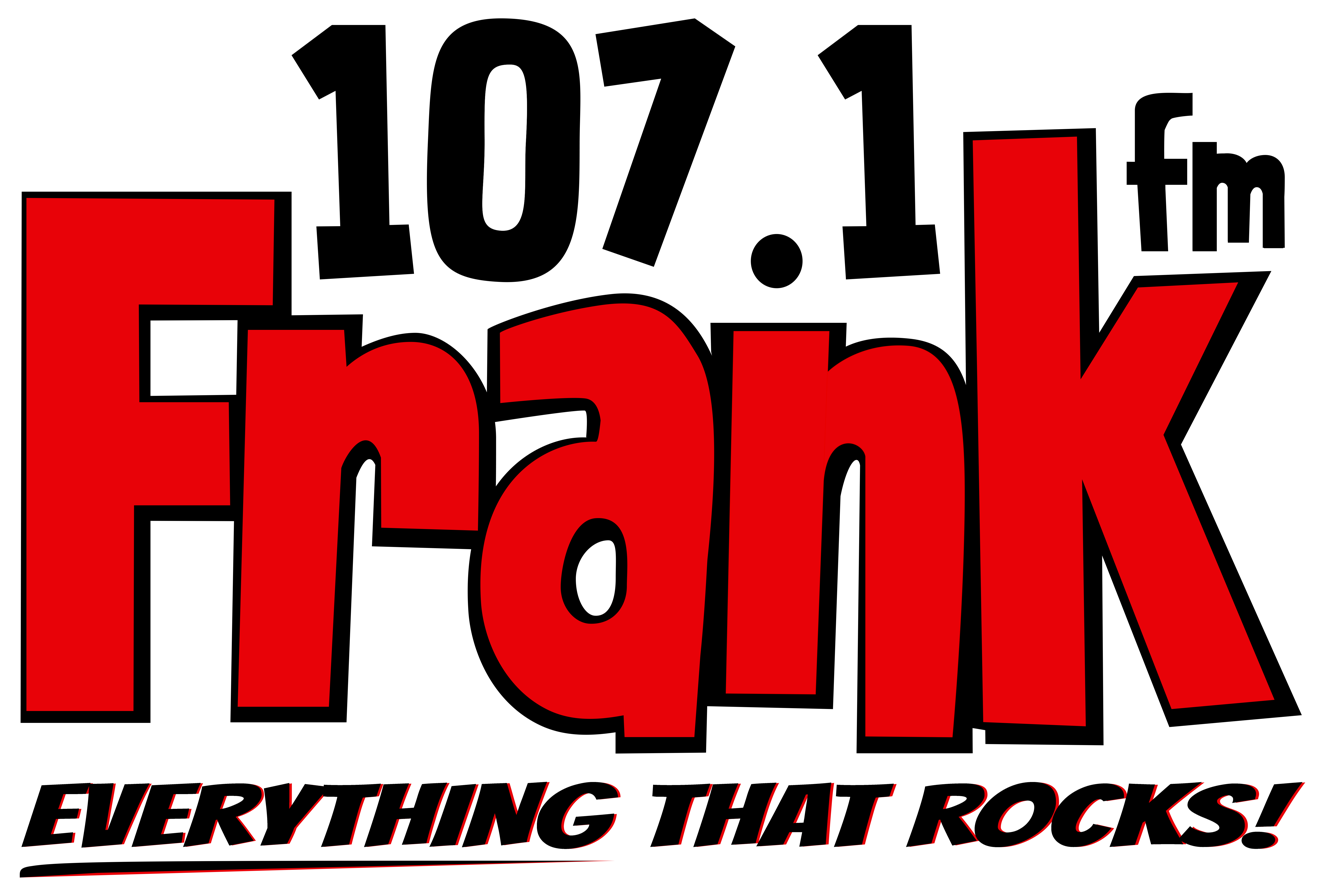
- Plattsburgh West, New York; United States
- Broadcast area: Plattsburgh, New York; Burlington, Vermont
- Frequency: 107.1 MHz
- Branding: 107.1 Frank-FM

Programming
- Format: Classic rock

Ownership
- Owner: Jeff Shapiro; (Great Eastern Radio, LLC)
- Sister stations: WJKS; WSNO-FM

History
- First air date: June 2008
- Former call signs: WDYC (2008); WELX (2008–2009); WNMR (2009–2016); WBKM (2016–2017); WWWF (2017–2018); WPLA (2018–2020)
- Call sign meaning: "Frank"

Technical information
- Licensing authority: FCC
- Facility ID: 164251
- Class: A
- ERP: 6,000 watts
- HAAT: 84 meters (276 ft)
- Transmitter coordinates: 44°43′16.6″N 73°44′09.7″W

Links
- Public license information: Public file; LMS
- Webcast: Listen live
- Website: www.frankvermont.com

WWFK (107.1 FM, "Frank FM") is a radio station broadcasting a classic rock radio format licensed to Plattsburgh West, New York. The station is owned by Jeff Shapiro, through licensee Great Eastern Radio, LLC, and operates in a simulcast with its WRFK (also on 107.1) in Barre.

The station's transmitter is located off Route 374 in Dannemora.

Until its sale to Great Eastern Radio in 2021, WWFK was known for frequent changes in format and management throughout its existence; founding owner Radioactive, LLC, controlled by Randy Michaels, outsourced operations of the station to other companies and organizations that typically only ran the station for a year at a time.

== History ==
A construction permit for the station, then allocated to Saranac Lake, New York, was granted to Radioactive, LLC on June 6, 2005, after having won it at auction in November 2004. The allocation was later moved to Dannemora. The station was initially assigned the call sign WDYC on February 15, 2008.

The station first signed on that June as WELX, as a simulcast of 102.9 WCLX in nearby Westport, New York. At the time, WCLX had an album oriented rock format. The WNMR call letters were introduced on April 6, 2009; within a week, the WCLX simulcast was discontinued, and the station temporarily went silent.

Logo as news/talk station "107.1 WNMR", used from September 2009 until May 1, 2010.

WNMR returned to the air that fall, under a local marketing agreement (LMA) with Convergence Entertainment and Communications. It carried a talk radio format, with most programming on WNMR syndicated, including The Dan Patrick Show, The Michael Smerconish Show, The Dave Ramsey Show, some programming from Bloomberg Radio, Free Talk Live, the Midnight Trucking Radio Network, lifestyle talk programming on weekends, and some Sporting News Radio content on Sundays. A local program, Corm and the Coach, aired in morning drive time and was co-hosted by Steve Cormier and Tom Brennan. The pair had previously been heard on WCPV until 2008. Convergence had planned a television simulcast of the show on WGMU. WNMR also carried hourly newscasts from ABC News Radio. However, the station struggled due to poor advertising revenues, leading Corm and the Coach to go on hiatus after the April 7, 2010, broadcast. Five days later, it was announced that Convergence had put WNMR's operations up for sale. On May 1, the station once again left the air.

Logo as all-sports station "107.1 The Game", used from June 2010 until March 11, 2011.

After Convergence formed a new broadcast subsidiary, CEC Media Group, the station resumed broadcasting in late June with an all-sports format. Most programming came from Sporting News Radio, save for a local afternoon show hosted by Rich DeLancey. Later, Mike O'Meara's one-hour talk show was added. However, automation problems forced WNMR off the air once more on March 11, 2011. Convergence ended its association with the station in July 2012; Convergence's owner, Jeff Loper, said that the company "had issues with finding people to run the thing successfully".

WNMR went back on air for a short amount of time as "107.1 The Fixx" with a rhythmic contemporary format. Due to disagreements with the owner, the station went off air. "The Fixx" continued as an Internet radio station. While WNMR was off the air, 107.1 WRFK, a classic hits station in Barre, could be heard in the Champlain Valley. By August 2014, the station was back on the air and stunting with polka music. A teaser ad stated that 107.1 would be the new home for "The Barrel". WNMR subsequently broadcast a country music format as "Kickin' Country 107.1".

The station changed its call sign to WBKM on March 15, 2016. The change came after Radioactive leased the station to Music Guild International, a Vermont corporation, which programmed an adult album alternative format, after having operated WBKM as an Internet radio station since 2008.

Logo as WWWF, from September 2017 through October 2018

The station changed its call sign again on September 16, 2017, to WWWF. During this period, the station had an adult hits format branded "What The FM", playing a variety of pop hits from classic rock, contemporary rock music, oldies and dance music.

On September 1, 2018, the call sign was changed to WPLA. On October 15, 2018, WPLA changed its format from adult hits to active rock, branded as "107.1 WPLA, Plattsburgh Rocks"; by this point, operations of the station had been taken over by A&J Radio. A&J Radio and Border Media merged to form Loud Media on May 6, 2020; on May 25, 2020, the combined company changed WPLA's format to classic hits and its nickname to "107.1 Lake FM".

On June 26, 2020, operations of WPLA were taken over by Great Eastern Radio, and the station returned to a rock format in a simulcast with Great Eastern-owned WRFK. The station changed its call sign to WWFK on July 1, 2020. The station's city of license changed to Plattsburgh West on December 4, 2020. Initially programming the station under an LMA, Great Eastern Radio filed to purchase the station for $75,000 in February 2021. The purchase was consummated on May 4, 2021.
