= WEXP (FM) =

- Westport, New York; United States
- Broadcast area: Burlington–Plattsburgh; Champlain Valley
- Frequency: 102.9 MHz
- Branding: Experimental Radio

Programming
- Format: Block programming

Ownership
- Owner: Sun Signals LLC

History
- First air date: January 1995
- Former call signs: WVZP (1992); WADQ (1992–1996); WMEX (1996–1998); WCLX (1998–2024)

Technical information
- Licensing authority: FCC
- Facility ID: 72034
- Class: A
- ERP: 6,000 watts
- HAAT: 92 meters (302 ft)
- Transmitter coordinates: 44°13′14.1″N 73°24′33.4″W

Links
- Public license information: Public file; LMS

WEXP (102.9 MHz) is a commercial FM radio station licensed to Westport, New York, and serving the Burlington-Plattsburgh radio market in the Champlain Valley. WEXP programs a block programming format and is owned by Sun Signals LLC. It calls itself "Experimental Radio". The studios are in Bridport, Vermont.

WEXP is a Class A FM station with an effective radiated power (ERP) of 6,000 watts. The transmitter is on Lake Shore Road, near Lake Champlain in Westport.

== History ==
While it was still a construction permit, and before it was built, the station was granted the call sign WVZP on September 2, 1992. On October 1, the call letters were changed to WADQ (for "Adirondack").

The station signed on the air in January 1995. On September 16, 1996, the station took on the call sign WMEX. During this time, the station had a classical music format, with the slogan, "Where classic call letters mean great Classical Music."

In the late 1990s, WMEX gradually morphed into "Burlington's Album Station", adopting WCLX call sign on February 10, 1999, when owner Dennis Jackson relinquished the historic "WMEX" call letters to Boston's 1060 AM. The WMEX calls subsequently moved to New Hampshire and then to Martha's Vineyard; as of April 2017, the call letters are used by WMEX in Boston and WMEX-LP in Rochester, New Hampshire.

WCLX changed its call sign to WEXP on August 1, 2024, in a partial call swap with WEXP-LP in Moriah, New York.

On December 19, 2024, WEXP switched to a pop-up block programming format, branded as "Experimental Radio".
