= WCLX-LP =

- Moriah, New York; United States
- Broadcast area: Southern Lake Champlain valley
- Frequency: 107.3 MHz

Programming
- Format: Adult album alternative

Ownership
- Owner: Champlain Music Appreciation Society, Inc.

History
- First air date: 2003
- Former call signs: WMUD-LP (2002–2024); WEXP-LP (2024)
- Former frequencies: 89.1 MHz (2003–2004); 89.3 MHz (2004–2015)

Technical information
- Licensing authority: FCC
- Facility ID: 132393
- Class: L1
- ERP: 100 watts
- HAAT: 5.8 meters (19 ft)
- Transmitter coordinates: 44°2′46.1″N 73°30′21.4″W

Links
- Public license information: LMS
- Webcast: Listen live
- Website: www.farmfreshradio.com

WCLX-LP is an adult album alternative–formatted broadcast radio station licensed to Moriah, New York, serving the Champlain Valley of New York and Vermont. WCLX-LP is owned and operated by Champlain Music Appreciation Society, Inc.
