= WAVJ (FM) =

Radio station in Waterbury–Burlington, Vermont

- Waterbury, Vermont; United States
- Broadcast area: Burlington–Plattsburgh
- Frequency: 103.3 MHz
- Branding: Air1

Programming
- Format: Christian worship music
- Network: Air1

Ownership
- Owner: Educational Media Foundation; (K-Love, Inc.)
- Sister stations: WKVJ

History
- First air date: February 14, 1985 (as WTIJ)
- Former call signs: WVRS (1983–1984); WTIJ (1984–1986); WGLY-FM (1986–1999); WDOT (1999–1999); WLKC (1999–2005); WWMP (2005–2024); WIXM (2024–2025)
- Former frequencies: 103.1 MHz (1985–1993)
- Call sign meaning: former call sign of WWMP (102.3 FM), which was formerly branded "Mix 102.3"

Technical information
- Licensing authority: FCC
- Facility ID: 20592
- Class: C3
- ERP: 2,850 watts
- HAAT: 284 meters (932 ft)
- Transmitter coordinates: 44°21′52.1″N 72°55′51.4″W
- Repeater: 103.3 WWMP-FM1 (Montpelier)

Links
- Public license information: Public file; LMS
- Website: www.air1.com

WAVJ (103.3 FM) is a radio station licensed to Waterbury, Vermont, United States. The station serves the Burlington–Plattsburgh area with a Christian worship music from the Air1 network. WAVJ is owned by K-Love, Inc., successor to the Educational Media Foundation.

WAVJ has an effective radiated power (ERP) of 2,850 watts. Its transmitter and tower is off Stoneface Road in Bolton, roughly halfway between Waterbury and Burlington. It also has a booster station in Montpelier.

The station went on the air in 1985 as a religious radio station, WTIJ; it became WGLY-FM after an ownership change a year later. It remained a commercial religious station, emphasizing contemporary Christian music starting in 1993, until its sale to Radio Broadcasting Services in 1999 led to a relaunch as soft adult contemporary station WLKC. In 2002, it began simulcasting modern adult contemporary station WXAL-FM; three years later, WLKC changed to adult hits as WWMP. A mainstream rock format replaced adult hits in 2019; in 2024, this format moved to 102.3 FM, with this station then switching to Air1 as WIXM ahead of a sale to the Educational Media Foundation, and subsequent renaming to WAVJ, in 2025.

== History ==
Masterpeace Communications first applied for a middle of the road and religious station on 103.1 MHz in Waterbury in October 1980; a revised application was filed in February 1981. Masterpeace's principals were Jack Hundley, Steve J. Planata, Brian Dodge, Kim White, William Wittik, and Richard Tillotson; Dodge, who owned 15 percent of the company, also had a 33-percent stake in WTIJ in Bellows Falls. The station was granted its construction permit on December 2, 1982, and was assigned the call sign WVRS on March 24, 1983.

The station changed its call sign to WTIJ—for "We Trust In Jesus"—on March 1, 1984, (Note: The previous WTIJ in Bellows Falls had been sold and renamed WBFL in 1983.) and was transferred to WTIJ Broadcasting that July; it signed on February 14, 1985. After another transfer to Harvest Broadcasting in September 1985, Brian Dodge sold control of the company to Alexander D. McEwing for $227,000 that November, a deal completed on February 14, 1986. On May 31, 1986, McEwing changed the call sign to WGLY-FM, for "With God's Love to You"; he would also change the corporate name to Family Broadcasting. The station had a predominantly religious format, airing blocks of Christian talk programs and music.

By 1990, Family Broadcasting had received approval to build a low-power television station on channel 39 in Burlington, and was seeking approval to launch a radio station in southern Vermont. In 1992, it acquired another religious station, WMNV (104.1 FM) in Rupert, from Peter and Mary Martin's Radio Rachel for $60,000. By this point, Family Broadcasting, in addition to WGLY-FM and WMNV, owned the construction permits for WGLV in Hartford and W39AS; its owners, in addition to Alexander McEwing, included Robert and Pamela Peake, Arthur McEwing, Dennis Fennell, Timothy Dodge, and the Canaan Foundation. WMNV would simulcast WGLY-FM until 1997, when it was sold to Capital Media Corporation for $125,000 to become a relay of WMYY (itself a relay of WHAZ).

In 1993, WGLY-FM moved from 103.1 to 103.3 MHz; its religious format also evolved to primarily contemporary Christian music. The station became an affiliate of Moody Radio airing a format of Christian music, lecture, campus chapel, listener-interactive talk, and devotionals. In January 1997, WGLY-FM was granted a booster station, WGLY-FM1, in Montpelier.

As a commercial religious station, half of WGLY-FM's revenues came from the sale of advertising, 20 percent came from paid programming, and the remaining 30 percent came from the listener-supported non-profit organization Christian Ministries. The increasing difficulty in selling advertising led McEwing to start, through Christian Ministries, a non-profit radio network in the mid-1990s. By 1998, he was forced to put his commercial facilities up for sale to repay his investors. On July 9, 1999, the call sign was changed to WDOT, ahead of a $700,000 sale to Radio Broadcasting Services; the WGLY call sign moved to the previous WDOT (1070 AM), which Family had acquired (as WZBZ) in 1997, and the two stations began a temporary simulcast.

The station became WLKC on September 28, 1999, as it relaunched as soft adult contemporary "Lake 103.3" and joined a cluster that included WLFE, WNCS, WSKI, and WWSR. WCMK, the Bolton transmitter in Christian Ministries' network, would take on WGLY-FM's call sign and programming. In June 2002, Radio Broadcasting Services owner Steven Silberberg closed WLKC's Essex Junction studios, with operations relocated to the Middlebury facilities of WXAL-FM; that September, the station dropped the soft adult contemporary format and began stunting with nature sounds as "Pure Vermont Radio" before shifting to a simulcast of WXAL-FM's "Alice" modern adult contemporary format. The simulcast gave "Alice" a better signal in Burlington.

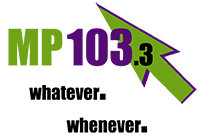
"MP103" logo (2010–2018)

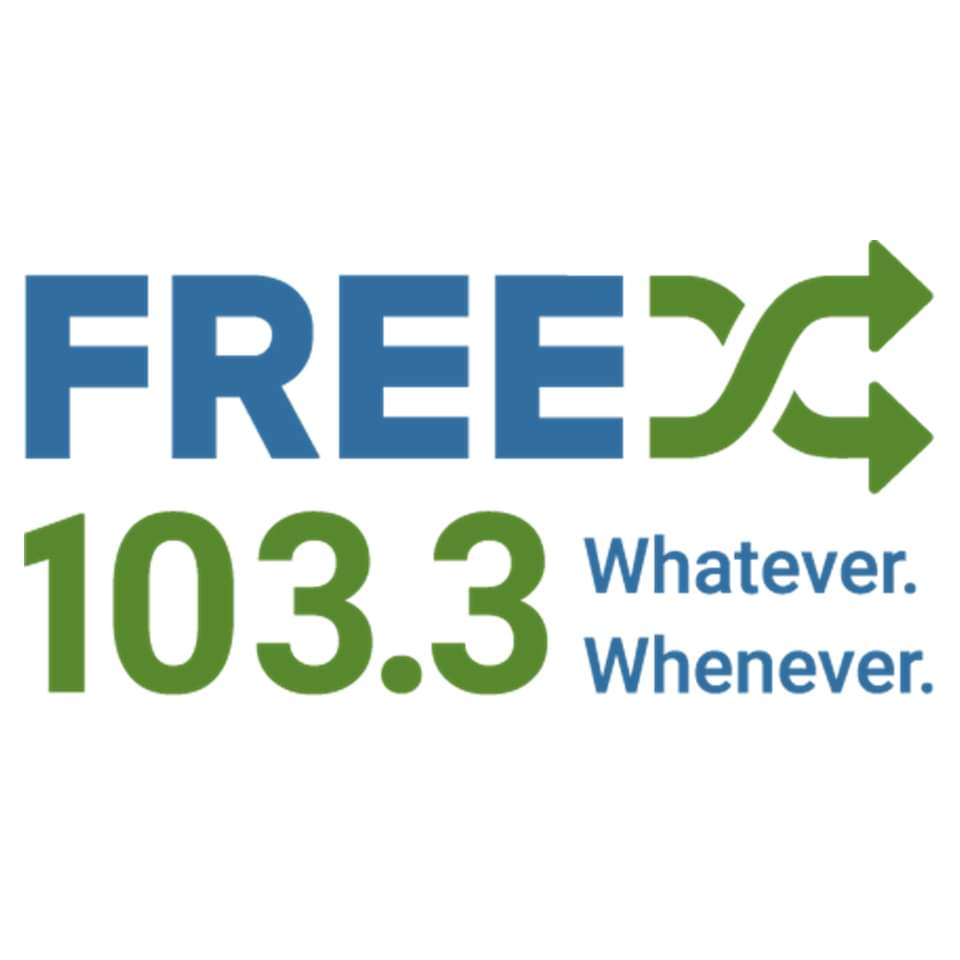
"Free 103.3" logo (2018–2019)

On June 1, 2005, WLKC and WXAL-FM flipped to an adult hits format. With its "MP 103" branding and no on-air DJs, the station patterned the format as an over-the-air MP3 player. The format change was followed by a call sign change to WWMP on June 13; station identifications during this time ceased to mention WXAL-FM, ahead of that station breaking away to become classic country station WUSX that August. In August 2018, WWMP rebranded as "Free 103.3" with no change in format.

"Rock 103.3" logo (2019–2024)

On October 17, 2019, WWMP dropped the adult hits format for mainstream rock, branded as "Rock 103.3". In April 2020, WSKI (1240 AM and 93.3 FM) began simulcasting WWMP to Montpelier (supplementing its existing booster) and Barre. WWMP was also simulcast on WCAT (1390 AM) for a time prior to that station's closure in 2022; it then inherited that station's FM translator, W252CJ (98.3).

On September 12, 2024, the mainstream rock format moved to WIXM (102.3 FM), which also inherited the simulcast on WSKI; WWMP then began running a loop redirecting listeners to 102.3. The two stations swapped call signs on September 18. On November 19, the loop was replaced with Christian worship music programming from Air1, ahead of Northeast Digital and Wireless' planned sale of the station to the Educational Media Foundation (EMF); Air1 programming previously aired in Burlington on W235BE (94.9 FM) and the second HD Radio channel of WGLY-FM. The $50,000 sale of WIXM and a translator station in Lebanon, New Hampshire, to EMF successor K-Love Inc. was formally filed in January 2025; following the sale's completion, WIXM's call sign changed to WAVJ on March 21.

== Booster ==
Call sign	Frequency	City of license	FID	ERP (W)	HAAT	Class	Transmitter coordinates	FCC info
WWMP-FM1	103.3 FM	Montpelier, Vermont	110504	11	11 m (36 ft)	D	44°16′49.2″N 72°33′28.3″W	LMS
