= WCLY (AM) =

Currently silent
- Bridport, Vermont; United States
- Frequency: 1490 kHz

Ownership
- Owner: Elliott Morgan; (Mud Radio LLC)

History
- First air date: July 22, 1966
- Former call signs: WFAD (1966–2026)

Technical information
- Licensing authority: FCC
- Facility ID: 53612
- Class: C
- Power: 960 watts
- Transmitter coordinates: 43°59′57.2″N 73°9′33.4″W

Links
- Public license information: Public file; LMS

WCLY (1490 AM) is a radio station in Bridport, Vermont, United States, that serves the Middlebury area. The station is owned by Elliott Morgan's Mud Radio LLC, and is silent.

The station debuted, as WFAD, in 1966, and from then until 1990 operated as a full-service station for Middlebury. After brief format changes to country and then adult contemporary, it went silent in late 1990, before spending the remainder of the decade as a primarily talk station. After being sold to Steve Silverberg's Northeast Broadcasting in 2001, WFAD offered oldies, sports, and comedy formats before being repurposed as a relay of other Northeast stations in Vermont, including The Point. From 2023 to 2025, it was owned by Christian Ministries as part of "The Light Radio Network".

== History ==
=== On the air, off and on again ===
Frank Alvin Delle, Jr., and Donald G. Fisher were initially granted on April 20, 1966, a construction permit for a new 1,000-watt radio station on 1490 kHz in Middlebury, for which they had filed more than four years prior. The station signed on shortly before noon on July 22, 1966, airing a full-service format and became affiliated with CBS. The studio facilities were so small that the Associated Press teletype machine was in the bathroom.

Almost immediately after the station opened, however, a legal problem emerged. WIPS, a radio station on 1250 kHz at Ticonderoga, New York, appealed the grant of the permit to Delle and Fisher. WIPS claimed that the new competitor would cause economic harm and make their business economically unviable, and on a 2–1 vote by a three-judge panel, they won a restraining order from the United States Court of Appeals for the District of Columbia Circuit on August 3. The ruling raised the likelihood that an order would force the brand-new station off the air; WFAD continued to broadcast until it received a telegram from the Federal Communications Commission at 2:35 p.m. on August 5, instructing it to cease operations.

WFAD launched a legal and public opinion campaign to allow the station to go forward, which included a petition signed by 5,000 residents of Addison County. The appeals court found in favor of WFAD and upheld the commission's grant of a construction permit on December 13. The court's action enabled WFAD to return to the air on Christmas Day.

=== Brady, Straus and Brady ===
Fisher, a 45 percent stockholder in licensee The Voice of Middlebury, Inc., sold his stake to Delle in 1970. After the sale, Delle told people that the WFAD call letters, which had initially been for "Frank and Don", instead represented his initials. Three years later, Addison Broadcasting, owned by Mark Brady and Timothy Buskey, acquired WFAD for $150,000; Buskey would sell his stake to Brady in 1976. Under Brady-Buskey ownership, WFAD launched an FM sister station, oldies-formatted WCVM (100.9 FM), on April 2, 1975, and moved to larger studio quarters. Also during this time, in the late 1970s, Jim Douglas, a Vermont state legislator, would join the WFAD announcing staff, working at the station to supplement his legislative salary; he would be elected Governor of Vermont in 2002, serving for eight years. New studios on U.S. Route 7 were completed in 1983.

After 14 years, the Brady family sold WFAD and WCVM to Straus Communications of New York City for $1.1 million. Straus made a series of decisions that alienated listeners of WFAD and WCVM, capped by a 1990 format flip to a country simulcast; in part due to a downturn in the Vermont economy, and despite reversing the earlier format change and restoring an adult contemporary music format on WFAD, both stations would go silent on December 6, 1990, at which time the Bradys reacquired the pair. As they had bought another FM outlet, WMNM of Port Henry, New York, they could not retain WCVM, which they put up for sale.

In its second stint as a Brady-owned station, WFAD became increasingly talk-oriented, airing The Rush Limbaugh Show and a local program, The Talk of Vermont, hosted by Timothy Philbin, a Republican politician who had lost in two elections to the House of Representatives. In 1993, Brady put the station on the market; 18 months later, there were still no bidders. After a $925,000 deal to sell WFAD and WMNM to Pathfinder Communications of Connecticut collapsed, at the start of 1997, the Bradys' Pro-Radio Inc., and Dynamite Radio Inc, which owned WGTK (the former WCVM), filed for bankruptcy. Ultimately, the WFAD license was sold to Kate Shermer and her husband, WPTZ-TV meteorologist Tom Messner, while Dynamite Radio operated the station and consolidated its facilities with WGTK.

The Talk of Vermont in particular grew in the late 1990s, when it was hosted by Jeff Kaufman; three additional stations in the state signed up to carry the show, and Kaufman also hosted a weekly show of the same name on Vermont Public Television. Kaufman resigned from the program in 2000 to pursue opportunities in California.

=== Northeast Broadcasting ownership ===
WFAD was sold in 2001 to Addison Broadcasting Company, owned by Steve Silverberg, for $180,000. Northeast Broadcasting, the parent of Addison, also acquired other stations, consolidating their operations in Middlebury; by 2002, the station aired an oldies format. It changed formats again, this time to sports, in 2005; WFAD had already aired local high school and college sports and was the longtime market home of Boston Red Sox broadcasts. By 2010, the station was operating as part of a three station sports network that also included WCAT in Burlington and WRSA in St. Albans; on January 1, 2011, the stations, which had been affiliated with ESPN Radio, moved to Fox Sports Radio after WCPV took the Burlington–Plattsburgh market's ESPN affiliation. By December, the Fox Sports Radio programming was itself replaced on the three stations by a simulcast of WIFY (93.7 FM) and its oldies format.

In August 2014, WFAD, along with WCAT and WRSA, began carrying the "Today's Comedy" format. On December 15, 2014, WFAD went silent due to the need to replace parts on its aging transmitter.

In February 2016, Northeast Broadcasting acquired several translators from Vermont Public Radio, one of which would be used to give WFAD an FM signal. On December 22, 2016, WFAD returned to the air—this time with the translator operating, as a simulcast of WIXM (102.3 FM) in the Burlington–Plattsburgh area. For a time in 2020, the station went silent as part of the replacement of its AM broadcasting tower. By 2022, WFAD had shifted to carrying The Point, Northeast Broadcasting's network of adult album alternative radio stations in Vermont.

=== Christian Ministries and Mud Radio ===
In December 2022, Northeast Broadcasting filed to sell WFAD and W266CU to Christian Ministries, Inc., for $85,000. The sale was consummated on February 16, 2023, with an expectation that Christian Ministries would soon switch the station to their Christian "The Light Radio Network" format.

Elliott Morgan's Mud Radio LLC, owner of WMUD in Brandon, began operating WFAD under a local marketing agreement in November 2024, ahead of a $3,000 purchase of the station in early 2025. In August 2025, WFAD went silent so that Mud could construct a new transmitter site for the station. In early 2026, Mud Radio applied to move the WFAD license from Middlebury to Bridport; on April 15, 2026, the station call sign was changed to WCLY.
