= Bolton (disambiguation) =

Bolton is a town in Greater Manchester, England, historically in Lancashire.

Bolton may also refer to:

== Places ==
=== Australia ===
- Bolton, Victoria

=== Canada ===
- Bolton, Ontario
- East Bolton, Eastern Townships, Quebec
- West Bolton, Eastern Townships, Quebec

=== United Kingdom ===
- Metropolitan Borough of Bolton, Greater Manchester
  - County Borough of Bolton (former)
  - Bolton (constituency)
- Bolton, Bradford, West Yorkshire, in Bolton and Undercliffe
- Bolton, County Armagh, a townland in County Armagh, Northern Ireland
- Bolton, Cumbria
- Bolton, East Riding of Yorkshire
- Bolton, Northumberland
- Bolton, East Lothian
- Bolton-le-Sands, Lancashire, known as Bolton until the 19th century
- Bolton-on-Swale, North Yorkshire, originally named Bolton

=== United States ===
- Bolton, Connecticut
- Bolton, Atlanta, Georgia, a neighborhood
- Bolton, Illinois
- Bolton, Kansas
- Bolton, Massachusetts
- Bolton, Michigan
- Bolton, Mississippi
- Bolton, Missouri
- Bolton, New York
- Bolton, North Carolina
- Bolton, Ohio
- Bolton, Vermont, a New England town
  - Bolton (CDP), Vermont, village in the town
- Bolton Field, an airport in Columbus, Ohio

== People ==
- Bolton (surname)
- Bolton Smilie, a character in the BBC TV drama Waterloo Road

== Other uses ==
- Bolton, a New Zealand Company sailing ship that bought immigrants to Wellington, New Zealand in 1840
- Bolton Wanderers F.C., an English professional football club
- Bolton Group, an Italian business conglomerate

== See also ==
- Bolten, a surname
- Boulton (disambiguation)
- Boltons
- House Bolton, fictional family in George RR Martin's A Song of Ice and Fire series
