= WCAT (Vermont) =

Radio station in Burlington, Vermont

- Burlington, Vermont; United States
- Broadcast area: Burlington-Plattsburgh area
- Frequency: 1390 kHz

Ownership
- Owner: Champlain Media Group; (Radio Broadcasting Services, Inc.)
- Sister stations: WFAD; WIFY; WIXM; WRSA; WWMP

History
- First air date: April 19, 1954 (as WDOT)
- Last air date: November 1, 2022
- Former call signs: WDOT (1954–1993); WKDR (1993–2002); WVAA (2002–2006)
- Call sign meaning: University of Vermont Catamounts

Technical information
- Facility ID: 73613
- Class: B
- Power: 5,000 watts
- Transmitter coordinates: 44°29′47.2″N 73°12′47.5″W

WCAT (1390 AM) was a commercial radio station licensed to Burlington, Vermont, United States, and serving the Burlington-Plattsburgh area. The station was last owned by Radio Broadcasting Services, Inc., part of the Champlain Media Group. It last aired a mainstream rock radio format, simulcast from co-owned WWMP (103.3 FM) in Waterbury.

WCAT broadcast at 5,000 watts around the clock, with a non-directional signal by day. To protect other stations on AM 1390 at night when AM radio waves travel farther, it used a directional antenna after sunset. WCAT's transmitter was located off Intervale Road in Burlington. Studios and offices were on Water Tower Circle in Colchester, Vermont. According to Federal Communications Commission records, WCAT's 445-foot (136 m) tower #1 is the tallest man-made structure in the State of Vermont.

WCAT also aired on an FM translator, W252CJ, at 98.3 MHz, to give listeners the option to hear the station in FM stereo.

== History ==
The station first signed on as WDOT on April 19, 1954, on the AM 1400 frequency at 250 watts of power. WDOT was Burlington's top-40 radio station for years and also an affiliate of the ABC Contemporary Radio Network. The station later moved to AM 1390, and was allowed to broadcast with 5,000 watts of power both daytime and nighttime. The station used a three-tower directional antenna at night to protect 1390 co-channel stations in Syracuse, New York (WFBL), Presque Isle, Maine (WEGP), and Plymouth, Massachusetts (WPLM).

The station changed its call sign to WKDR on June 1, 1993. The WKDR calls originated on the AM 1070 frequency, licensed to Plattsburgh, New York (which now operates as WJMP), and the move benefited WKDR, since its previous position operates only in the daytime, protecting the former 50,000-watt clear channel (1-B) station, CBA in Moncton, New Brunswick.

The station changed its call letters to WVAA on September 24, 2002, and to WCAT on August 21, 2006.

WCAT, as a sports radio station, switched affiliations from ESPN Radio to Fox Sports Radio on January 1, 2011. The ESPN affiliation moved to WCPV (101.3 FM). Through much of 2011, WCAT broadcast a sports talk format simulcast with sister stations WRSA (1420 AM) and WFAD (1490 AM) as "Fox Sports Vermont". By the end of the year, it had switched to an oldies music format simulcast with co-owned WIFY in Addison as "Cruisin' 93.7".

On September 1, 2014, WCAT (with sister station WRSA) dropped the simulcast with WIFY and switched to a comedy radio format. The two stations returned to oldies in July 2015. In early January 2017, WCAT and WRSA both went dark. The oldies format relocated to WPLB (1070 AM), which several months earlier had been sold by WCAT owner Northeast Broadcasting.

On January 9, 2017, WCAT returned to the air, launching a business news format, also heard on FM translator 98.3 and co-owned WRSA.

WCAT's license was surrendered on November 1, 2022. The Federal Communications Commission cancelled it on the same day.

== Translator ==
WCAT programming was broadcast on the following translator:

Call sign	Frequency	City of license	FID	ERP (W)	HAAT	Class	Transmitter coordinates	FCC info
W252CJ	98.3 FM	Burlington, Vermont	155550	220	54.2 m (178 ft)	D	44°29′50.2″N 73°12′49.5″W	LMS

== See also ==
- WCAT Radio Tower
