= WIXM =

WIXM may refer to:

- WAVJ (FM), a radio station (103.3 FM) licensed to Waterbury, Vermont, United States, which held the call sign WIXM from 2024 to 2025
- WWMP, a radio station (102.3 FM) licensed to St. Albans, Vermont, which held the call sign WIXM from 2012 to 2024
- WENJ, a radio station (97.3 FM) licensed to Millville, New Jersey, United States, which held the call sign WIXM from 2002 to 2006
