= Bolton (CDP), Vermont =

Census-designated place in Vermont, United States

Bolton, Vermont
- Census-designated place
- Location within Vermont Location within the United States
- Coordinates: 44°22′29″N 72°53′16″W
- Country: United States
- State: Vermont
- County: Chittenden
- Town: Bolton

Area
  - Total: 0.069 sq mi (0.18 km^{2})
  - Land: 0.069 sq mi (0.18 km^{2})
  - Water: 0 sq mi (0.0 km^{2})
- Elevation: 341 ft (104 m)
- Time zone: UTC-5 (Eastern (EST))
  - Summer (DST): UTC-4 (EDT)
- ZIP Code: 05676 (Waterbury)
- Area code: 802
- FIPS code: 50-06475
- GNIS feature ID: 2807128

Bolton is the primary village and a census-designated place (CDP) in the town of Bolton, Chittenden County, Vermont, United States. It was first listed as a CDP prior to the 2020 census.

== Geography ==
The village is in eastern Chittenden County, on the north side of the valley of the Winooski River as it cuts through the center of the Green Mountains. The village is located along U.S. Route 2, which leads east 7 miles (11 km) to Waterbury and west 6 miles (10 km) to Richmond. Interstate 89 forms the northern edge of the community; the nearest access is from Exit 10 at Waterbury or Exit 11 at Richmond.
