= WNGN =

WNGN may refer to:

- WNGN (FM), a radio station (91.9 FM) licensed to Argyle, New York, United States
- WNGN-LD, a low-power television station (channel 36, virtual 38) licensed to Troy, New York, United States
