= Bolton Valley =

Ski area in Vermont, United States

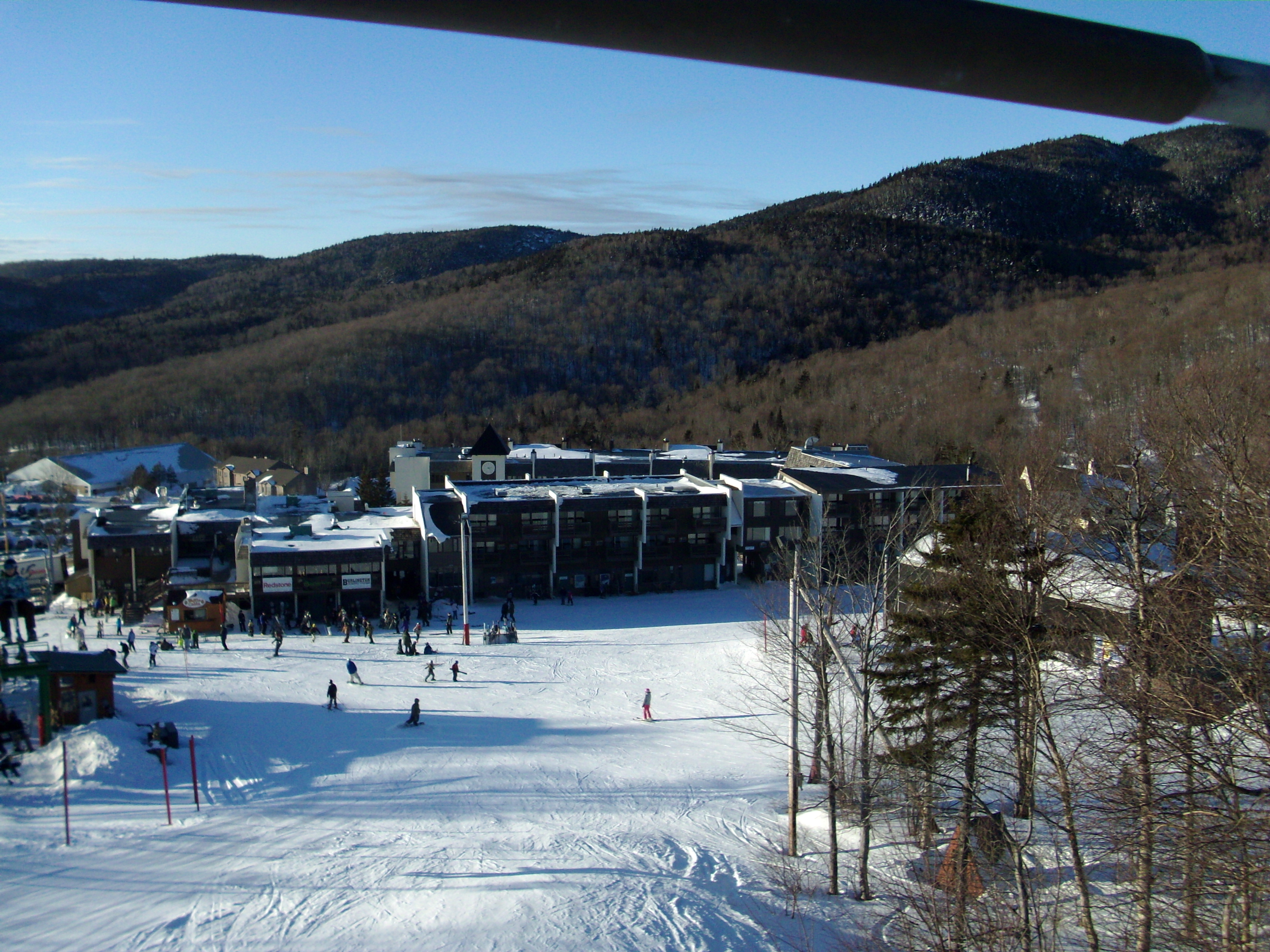
- The Main Lodge at Bolton Valley Resort
- Interactive map of Bolton Valley
- Location: Bolton, Vermont, U.S.
- Nearest city: Burlington, Vermont, U.S. (21 miles)
- Coordinates: 44°24′57″N 72°52′11″W
- Vertical: 1,625 feet (495 m)
- Top elevation: 3,150 feet (960 m)
- Base elevation: 1,446 feet (441 m)
- Skiable area: 165 acres (0.67 km^{2})
- Trails: 71
- Lift system: 6 Lifts; 2 quads, 3 doubles, 1 rope tow
- Terrain parks: 3
- Night skiing: 12 trails
- Website: Bolton Valley Resort

Bolton Valley is a mid-sized ski area in the town of Bolton in Chittenden County, Vermont, United States. It is located in close proximity to Burlington, the largest city in the state of Vermont. The community around the base of the ski area was listed as the Bolton Valley census-designated place prior to the 2020 census.

== History ==
The resort was founded in 1966 by Ralph DesLauriers and his father. Bolton thrived for many years as a family-friendly resort and spawned two famous skiers, Rob and Eric DesLauriers, who went on to star in dozens of ski movies. With their brother Adam, they founded Straight Up Films; Adam remains in the area with a more recent venture, Beech Seal Media, named for a ski trail at the resort and a unique type of communication in Vermont lore.

In 1971 Chateau des Monts, a 20 unit hotel condominium complex was completed next to the base lodge (later connected) by Charles P Jones and Land Development Incorporated.

Beginning around 1997, the resort has been under the control of a handful of new owners and struggled with financial viability. However, it has stabilized under the leadership of industry veteran Bob Fries and seen steady improvement in the 2003-2004, 2004–2005, and 2005-2006 seasons, although just before the 2007-2008 season his shares in the company were bought by two locals, and Bolton Valley is now completely locally owned. Jake Blauvelt grew up riding at Bolton Valley and hosts the annual Blauvelt's Banks Banked Slalom.

As of the Spring of 2017 the original owner Ralph DesLauriers and a small group of investors have purchased the mountain back from Red Stone Properties. Ralph, along with his children are now operating Bolton once again.

== Lifts and trails ==
- Vertical drop: 1,704 ft (519 m)
- Trails: 71 trails
- Night Skiing: 12 trails
- Skiable area: 165 acres (668,000 m²)
- Bolton Valley has 6 lifts.

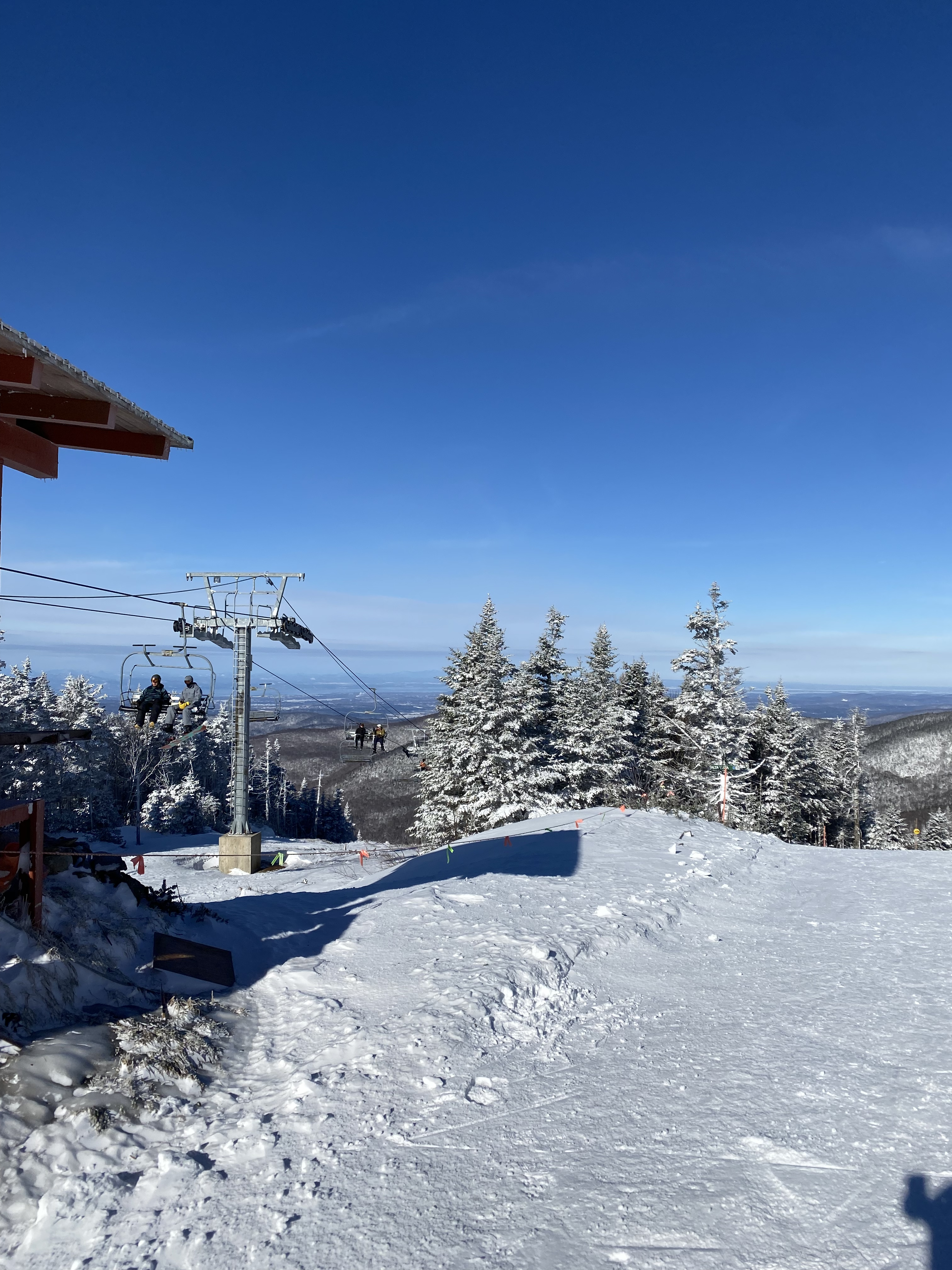
Vista Quad at the summit

Name	Type	Manufacturer	Built	Vertical (feet)	Length (feet)	Notes
Vista	Quad	Doppelmayr CTEC	2005	955	4389	Main lift out of the base area, and has a wind turbine at the summit.
Timberline	Quad	Doppelmayr CTEC	1986	940	3790	Has a mid-station.
Wilderness	Double	Hall	1966	963	4948	Longest lift on the mountain, and also has a mid-station.
Mid Mountain	Double	Hall	1966	312	1798	
Snowflake	Double	Hall	1966	250	1230	Services the terrain parks.
Mighty Mite	Rope Tow	Homemade	1997	-	-	Beginner lift.

== Nordic skiing ==
Bolton Valley has 100 kilometres (100,000 m) of Nordic skiing, 35 kilometres (35,000 m) of which are groomed.

== Westward orientation ==
Bolton Valley is one of the few westward facing ski areas in Vermont.

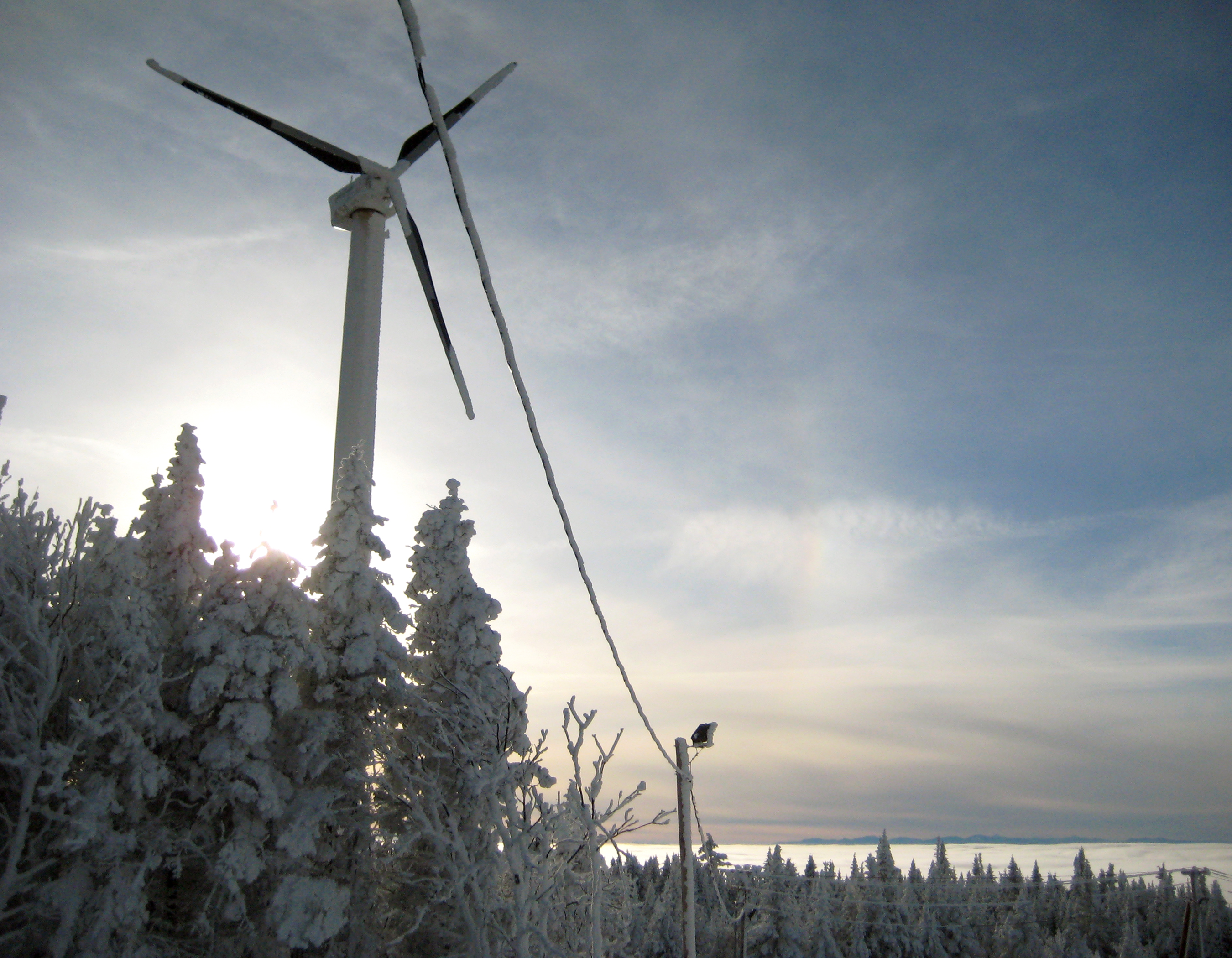
Wind turbine at Bolton Valley

== Wind turbine ==
In 2009, Bolton Valley installed a Northwind 100 wind turbine, which was made by Northern Power Systems. The turbine was projected to produce 300,000 kilowatt hours of electricity annually. It is located near the top of the Vista Quad chairlift.

== Newsletter ==
Bolton Valley publishes a humorous weekly newsletter covering snow news, event listings, and deals.
