= WKAF =

WKAF may refer to:

- WKAF (AM), a radio station (1420 AM) licensed to St. Albans, Vermont, United States
- WZRM, a radio station (97.7 FM) licensed to Brockton, Massachusetts, United States, which held the call sign WKAF from 2006 to 2021
- WSYT, a television station (channel 14, virtual 68) licensed to Syracuse, New York, United States, which held the call sign WKAF from 1982 to 1986
