= The Point (radio network) =

Network of adult album alternative radio stations in Vermont

- Broadcast area: Northern Vermont
- Branding: Independent Radio, The Point

Programming
- Format: Adult album alternative

Ownership
- Owner: Northeast Broadcasting

Coverage
- Stations: See § Frequencies

Links
- Webcast: Listen live
- Website: www.pointfm.com

The Point ("Independent Radio, The Point") is a radio network operating in the state of Vermont. The flagship station is WNCS (104.7 FM) in Montpelier, which signed on in 1977. It was started by Jeb Spaulding who later served as Chancellor of the Vermont State Colleges, State Treasurer of Vermont, and Secretary of Administration under Vermont Governor Peter Shumlin. Although at that time there was no designated adult album alternative format, The Point's programming format has been solidly adult album alternative/progressive rock for its entire history.

The Point has won numerous national awards over the course of its history, including trade publication Radio and Records' AAA Station of the Year (markets 101+) in 2005, 2006, 2007, and 2008, which was the publication's final year of operation. In 2008, The Point was inducted into the trade publication FMQB's Hall Of Fame for AAA Stations in markets 51 and smaller, and in 2013 The Point was named FMQB's AAA Station of the Year (markets 50+).

== Frequencies ==
The Point broadcasts on five FM stations. They are:

Call sign	Frequency	City of license	Facility ID	Class	ERP (W)	Height (m (ft))	Transmitter coordinates	First air date	Broadcast area	Former call signs
WIFY	93.7 FM	Addison, Vermont	83867	C3	21,000	108 m (354 ft)	44°13′15.2″N 73°24′35.5″W	2014 (Note: WIFY has operated since 1999, but carried other formats prior to joining The Point in 2014.)	Addison; Middlebury; Burlington	WWFY (1996–1999); WRRO (1999–2001); WXAL-FM (2001–2005); WUSX (2005–2010)
WDOT	95.7 FM	Danville, Vermont	4001	A	3,800	75 m (246 ft)	44°24′58.2″N 72°3′30.3″W	1996	Danville; Saint Johnsbury	WSHX (1989–1999)
WNCS (Note: Flagship station)	104.7 FM	Montpelier, Vermont	43655	C2	1,900	634 m (2,080 ft)	44°25′14.1″N 72°49′40.4″W	1977	Montpelier; Burlington	—

Notes:

Broadcast translators for WNCS
Call sign	Frequency	City of license	FID	ERP (W)	HAAT	Class	Transmitter coordinates	FCC info
W227AQ	93.3 FM	Burlington, Vermont	145050	220	0 m (0 ft)	D	44°29′50.2″N 73°12′49.5″W	LMS
W262AA	100.3 FM	Montpelier, Vermont	43656	100	31.7 m (104 ft)	D	44°16′49.2″N 72°33′28.3″W	LMS

All of the stations are owned by Montpelier Broadcasting Inc., which, in turn, is owned by Northeast Broadcasting, Inc., (based in Bedford, New Hampshire), which also owns WWMP (and formerly owned WCAT) in Burlington; WSKI in Montpelier; and other stations in Andover, Massachusetts, and in Colorado, Idaho, and Wyoming.

=== Former stations ===
The Point was also carried by WRJT (103.1 FM) in Royalton, serving the White River Junction–Lebanon–Hanover area, from its 1996 sign on until its sale to the Educational Media Foundation (EMF) in 2020; it is now K-Love station WZKC. WRJT also operated translator W299AM (107.7 FM) in Lebanon, New Hampshire; that facility was retained by Northeast Broadcasting, and began carrying separately-owned WFRD in 2011. W299AM was itself sold to EMF's successor, K-Love Inc., in 2025, and resumed carrying WZKC.

WFAD (1490 AM) and translator W266CU (101.1 FM) in Middlebury carried The Point in the early 2020s, prior to its 2022 sale to Christian Ministries.
