= WSKI =

Radio station in Montpelier, Vermont, United States

Simulcasting WWMP Grand Isle
- Montpelier, Vermont; United States
- Frequency: 1240 kHz
- Branding: Rock 102.3

Programming
- Format: Mainstream rock

Ownership
- Owner: Northeast Broadcasting; (Galloway Communications, Inc.)
- Sister stations: WNCS

History
- First air date: December 7, 1947
- Call sign meaning: "Ski"

Technical information
- Licensing authority: FCC
- Facility ID: 23049
- Class: C
- Power: 1,000 watts (unlimited)
- Transmitter coordinates: 44°14′40.2″N 72°32′45.4″W
- Translator: 93.3 W227DF (Montpelier)

Links
- Public license information: Public file; LMS
- Webcast: Listen live (via TuneIn)
- Website: rock1023fm.com

WSKI (1240 AM, "Rock 102.3") is a radio station licensed to serve Montpelier, Vermont, United States. It is owned by Galloway Communications, Inc., a subsidiary of Bedford, New Hampshire-based Northeast Broadcasting. It airs a mainstream rock format as a simulcast of WWMP (102.3 FM).

The station was assigned the WSKI call letters by the Federal Communications Commission.

== History ==
WSKI began broadcasting on December 7, 1947, on 1240 kHz with 250 watts of power. The station was owned by Carl R. Taylor and B.M. Jacobsen.

WSKI's logo under former ESPN Radio affiliation

While it previously aired a sports radio format that derived most of its programming from ESPN Radio and later CBS Sports Radio, WSKI also aired local sports play-by-play, including being the official radio home for the Vermont Mountaineers of the NECBL. Late night programming included Speed Freaks, The Video Game Review, and Sports Overnight America.

WSKI's longest continual running program is The Classic Country Jamboree, which has aired every Saturday since 1996. The show is hosted by former WSKI radio host Dick Sicely who was with the station from the 1960s to the 1980s. The station has had a number of announcers still found in area markets. The longest serving announcer, the late Bob Bannon, was with the station from the late 1940s and into the 1990s.

On April 22, 2020, WSKI changed their format from sports to a simulcast of mainstream rock-formatted WWMP (103.3 FM). When the format moved from 103.3 to WIXM (102.3 FM) on September 12, 2024, the simulcast on WSKI continued.
