= WJMP (AM) =

Radio station in Plattsburgh, New York

- Plattsburgh, New York; United States
- Broadcast area: Champlain Valley
- Frequency: 1070 kHz
- Branding: JUMP 103.7

Programming
- Format: Classic hip hop
- Affiliations: Compass Media Networks

Ownership
- Owner: Loud Media; (A & J Radio LLC)

History
- First air date: June 15, 1968
- Former call signs: WKDR (1967–1993); WNWX (1993–1995); WZBZ (1995–1998); WDOT (1998–1999); WGLY (1999–2001); WLFE (2001–2002); WTWK (2002–2017); WPLB (2017–2021)
- Call sign meaning: "Jump"

Technical information
- Licensing authority: FCC
- Facility ID: 27554
- Class: D
- Power: 5,000 watts (daytime only)
- Transmitter coordinates: 44°36′15.16″N 73°27′18.49″W
- Translator: 103.7 W279DE (Plattsburgh)

Links
- Public license information: Public file; LMS
- Webcast: Listen live
- Website: www.jumpradio.com/plattsburgh-burlington

WJMP (1070 kHz) is an AM radio station broadcasting a classic hip hop format. Licensed to Plattsburgh, New York, United States, the station serves the Champlain Valley, including Burlington, Vermont. The station is owned by Loud Media. WJMP's programming is also heard on translator station W279DE (103.7 FM) in Plattsburgh.

== History ==
The station went on the air on June 15, 1968, as WKDR. It became WNWX on June 1, 1993. On April 14, 1995, the station changed its call sign to WZBZ; on January 23, 1998, to WDOT; on July 15, 1999, to WGLY; on February 23, 2001, to WLFE; on April 23, 2002, to WTWK and on January 15, 2017, to WPLB.

A & J Radio acquired WTWK from Radio Broadcasting Services (a subsidiary of Northeast Broadcasting) for $140,000 on October 24, 2016. At the time of the sale, the station was running a business news format supplied by Bloomberg Radio. In January 2017, after briefly simulcasting WZXP (a country music station operated by A & J Radio but owned by Radioactive, LLC), the station introduced an oldies and classic country format, which was transferred from former sister stations WCAT and WRSA.

A & J Radio merged with Border Media to form Loud Media in 2020. On June 13, 2020, WPLB dropped its oldies format for a classic hip hop format using Loud Media's JUMP brand. The station is branded as JUMP 103.7. The WJMP call letters were moved here from 1120 AM in Maryville, Tennessee, on October 1, 2021.

== Translator ==
Broadcast translator for WJMP
Call sign	Frequency	City of license	FID	ERP (W)	Class	Transmitter coordinates	FCC info
W279DE	103.7 FM	Plattsburgh, New York	148772	250	D	44°29′47.1″N 73°12′47.5″W	LMS
