= WFTF =

American radio station in Vermont

- Rutland, Vermont; United States
- Frequency: 90.9 MHz
- Branding: Air 1

Programming
- Format: Christian worship
- Affiliations: Air1

Ownership
- Owner: Christian Ministries, Inc.
- Sister stations: WCKJ, WCMD-FM, WCMK, WGLV, WGLY-FM

History
- First air date: 1987
- Former frequencies: 90.5 MHz (1987–2016)

Technical information
- Licensing authority: FCC
- Facility ID: 11095
- Class: A
- ERP: 60 watts
- HAAT: 680 meters (2,230 ft)
- Transmitter coordinates: 43°37′09″N 72°59′04″W

Links
- Public license information: Public file; LMS
- Website: WFTF website

WFTF (90.9 MHz, "Air 1") is an FM radio station licensed to Rutland, Vermont, and affiliated with the Educational Media Foundation's Air1 network. The station is owned by Christian Ministries, Inc.

== Translators ==
WFTF's programming is also heard on translator stations on 94.9 in Burlington, Vermont and 106.5 in Montpelier.

Call sign	Frequency	City of license	FID	ERP (W)	HAAT	Class	FCC info	Notes
W235BE	94.9 FM	Burlington, Vermont	154167	250	25.2 m (83 ft)	D	LMS	Relays WGLY-HD2
W293BR	106.5 FM	Montpelier, Vermont	154104	250	161 m (528 ft)	D	LMS	Relays WCMD-HD2
