= Boulton =

Boulton may refer to:

- Boulton (surname)
- Boulton, Derby, England

== See also ==
- Boulton Paul Aircraft Ltd, aircraft manufacturer
- Boulton and Watt, partnership between Matthew Boulton and James Watt
- Bolton (disambiguation)
