= WCAT Radio Tower =

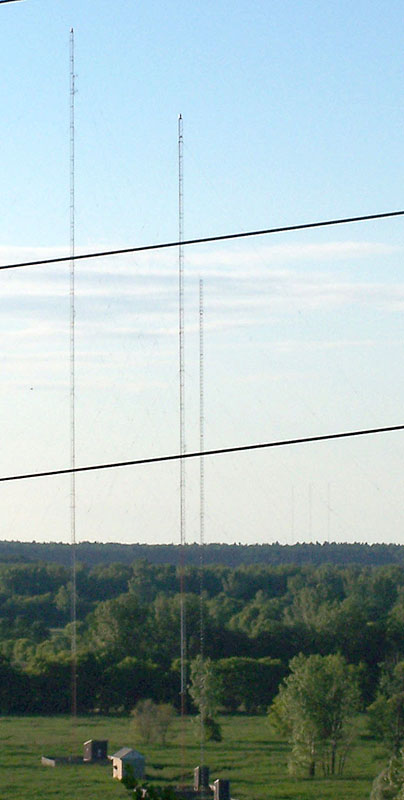
- The left most tower is the tallest tower.
- Interactive map of the WCAT Radio Tower area

General information
- Type: Radio tower
- Location: Burlington, Vermont, Intervale Road, Burlington, Vermont, United States
- Coordinates: 44°29′47″N 073°12′49″W
- Elevation: 31.4 meters (103 ft)
- Completed: 1981
- Owner: Silverbow Communications Inc.

Height
- Height: 135.7 meters (445 ft)

The WCAT Radio Tower, at 135.7 meters (445 ft), is the tallest man-made structure in Vermont. It is located in Burlington, Vermont. The station broadcast with 5,000 watts. WCAT was the only radio station that had a radio tower within the city limits of Burlington. There is a second 109.0-meter (357.6 ft) tower, also built in 1981, which is a directional aerial beside the WKDR Radio Tower. There is also a third tower on the site, which is 81.0 meters (265.7 ft) tall.

== See also ==
- List of tallest structures in the United States
- WCAT
