= Bolten =

Bolten is a surname. Notable people with the surname include:

- Alida Bolten (1903–1984), Dutch freestyle swimmer
- Joachim Friedrich Bolten (1718–1796), German physician and conchologist
- Joshua Bolten (born 1954), American governmental official
- Virginia Bolten (1870–1960), Argentine anarchist

== See also ==
- Bolten Peak, a summit in Antarctica
- Bolton (disambiguation)
- Peter Friedrich Röding, German malacologist whose work was misattributed to Joachim Friedrich Bolten
