= Waterbury Village Historic District =

Historic district in Vermont, United States

- U.S. National Register of Historic Places
- U.S. Historic district
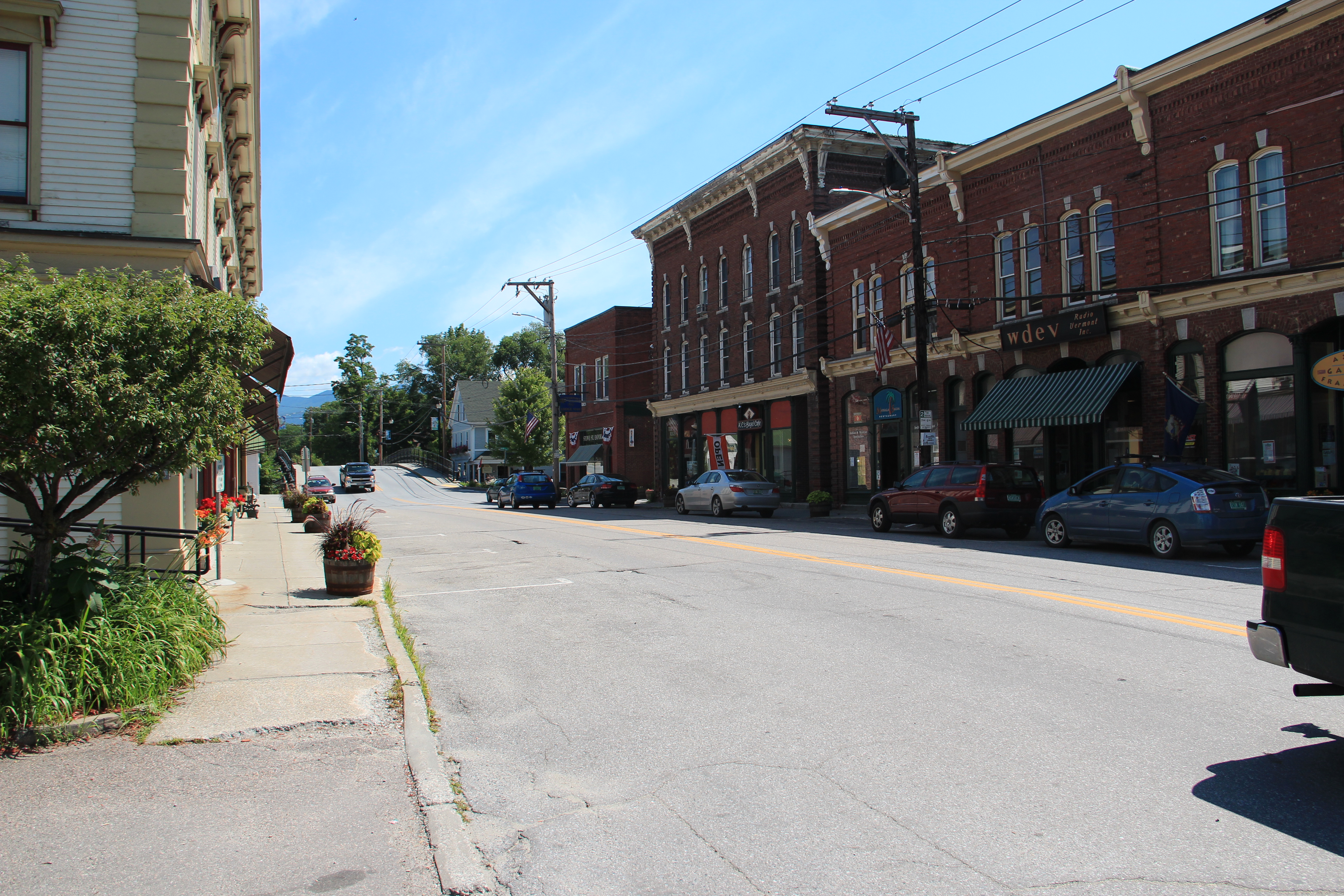
- Interactive map of Waterbury Village Historic District
- Location: U.S. 2, Waterbury, Vermont
- Coordinates: 44°20′6″N 72°45′17″W
- Area: 102 acres (41 ha)
- Architectural style: Greek Revival, Federal, Late Victorian
- NRHP reference No.: 78000249 (original); 100007056 (increase)

Significant dates
- Added to NRHP: August 24, 1978
- Boundary increase: September 29, 2021

The Waterbury Village Historic District encompasses most of the central commercial and residential area of Waterbury, Vermont. Located along United States Route 2 and Stowe Street south of Thatcher Branch of the Winooski River, the sprawling village has been shaped by changes in transportation in the 19th and 20th centuries, and by key economic developments such as the founding of the Vermont State Hospital, which anchors the village's southern end. The district was listed on the National Register of Historic Places in 1978.

== Description and history ==
Waterbury's early settlement took place about 1770, with the establishment of a small cluster of houses along the Winooski River near what is now Winooski Street. When Main Street, a stagecoach route paralleling the river opened in the 1790s, development moved to that area, including the construction of churches, residences, and businesses. Development also began along Stowe Street, running north from Main Street roughly along the eastern side of Thatcher Branch. Thatcher Branch was also amenable to the development of industry powered by its waters, whose early successes spurred further growth. In 1849, the railroad was built through the area, with the main depot located further south of the main business district. A cluster of commercial development took place in that area, and industries arose along the railroad corridor. Vermont State Hospital opened in 1892, spurring additional growth south of the station, which included development of Randall Street, paralleling Main Street, as a tree-lined residential enclave.

The historic district's main spine is Main Street (US 2), extending from its crossing of Thatcher Branch south just beyond the campus of the Vermont State Hospital (now mainly occupied by state offices, and separately listed on the National Register in 2016). The railroad line runs parallel to Main Street to the northeast, and the district includes Railroad Street and Union Street, which flank it on the other side. Connecting streets include Park Row, where the former train station is, and Stowe Street, where the densest part of the business district is located at the junction with Main Street. The district extends about halfway along Winooski Street to the Winooski River, and along Randall Street between Elm Street and hospital complex. Boundary changes to the district were approved in 2021.

== See also ==
- National Register of Historic Places listings in Washington County, Vermont
