= WGLY-FM =

- Bolton, Vermont; United States
- Broadcast area: Burlington-Plattsburgh
- Frequency: 91.5 MHz (HD Radio)
- Branding: The Light

Programming
- Format: Christian radio
- Subchannels: HD2: Air1
- Affiliations: The Light Radio Network; Salem Radio Network

Ownership
- Owner: Christian Ministries, Inc.
- Sister stations: WCKJ; WCMD-FM; WCMK; WFTF; WGLV

History
- First air date: 1996
- Former call signs: WCMK (1996–1999)

Technical information
- Licensing authority: FCC
- Facility ID: 11084
- Class: C3
- ERP: 1,000 watts
- HAAT: 285 meters (935 ft)
- Transmitter coordinates: 44°21′53.1″N 72°55′50.4″W
- Translator: See § Translators
- Repeater: See § Stations

Links
- Public license information: Public file; LMS
- Webcast: Listen live
- Website: thelightradio.net

WGLY-FM (91.5 MHz, "The Light") is a Christian radio station licensed to Bolton, Vermont, serving the Burlington area. The station is owned by Christian Ministries, Inc.

== Programming ==
The Light Radio Network's programming includes Christian talk and teaching and Christian music. Christian talk and teaching shows heard on The Light Radio network include; Mornings with Shawn, The Gail Robbins Show, Saturday's With Susan, The Brant Hansen Show, Turning Point with David Jeremiah, Truth for Life with Alistair Begg, Enjoying Everyday Life with Joyce Meyer, Insight For Living with Chuck Swindoll, Joni and Friends, Focus On The Family, and In The Market with Janet Parshall. The Light Radio Network also carries Air 1 programming on WGLY-FM HD2, and repeaters.

== Stations ==
The Light Radio Network is also heard on five other full powered stations in Vermont, as well as five low powered translators.

Call sign	Frequency	City of license	Facility ID	ERP (W)	Height m (ft)	Class	Transmitter coordinates
WCMD-FM	89.9 FM (HD)	Barre, Vermont	11085	1,500	172 m (564 ft)	A	44°7′37″N 72°28′31.3″W
WCMK	91.9 FM	Putney, Vermont	88180	80	231 m (758 ft)	A	42°58′28.2″N 72°36′10.3″W
WCKJ	90.5 FM	St. Johnsbury, Vermont	76054	1,000	225 m (738 ft)	C3	44°24′40.2″N 71°58′11.3″W
WGLG	89.9 FM	Swanton, Vermont	172444	225	−5 m (−16 ft)	A	44°55′2.1″N 73°7′25.4″W
WGLV	91.7 FM	Woodstock, Vermont	82833	100	694 m (2,277 ft)	A	43°38′22.2″N 72°50′10.3″W

=== Translators ===
Call sign	Frequency	City of license	FID	ERP (W)	HAAT	Class	Transmitter coordinates	FCC info	Notes
W216CB	91.1 FM	Ascutney, Vermont	89943	10	612.5 m (2,010 ft)	D	43°26′15″N 72°27′6″W	LMS	Relays WGLV
W220AX	91.9 FM	Ludlow, Vermont	11099	10	16 m (52 ft)	D	43°22′4.2″N 72°40′49.3″W	LMS	Relays WGLY-FM & HD1
W266CU	101.1 FM	Middlebury, Vermont	154466	80	0 m (0 ft)	D	43°59′57.4″N 73°9′33″W	LMS	Relays WGLV
W243AE	96.5 FM	Orleans, Vermont	11086	10	182.5 m (599 ft)	D	44°46′1.1″N 72°8′59.3″W	LMS	Relays WCMD-FM & HD1
W242AG	96.3 FM	Quechee, Vermont	84028	4	121 m (397 ft)	D	43°39′15.3″N 72°21′30.3″W	LMS	Relays WGLV

== History ==
WGLY-FM began broadcasting in 1996, holding the call sign WCMK. The station's call sign was changed to WGLY-FM in 1999.

WGLG was formerly WNGF, owned by Northeast Gospel Broadcasting; in August 2013, Christian Ministries reached a deal to acquire WNGF. Upon the deal's completion on April 15, 2014, WNGF's call letters were changed to WGLG.

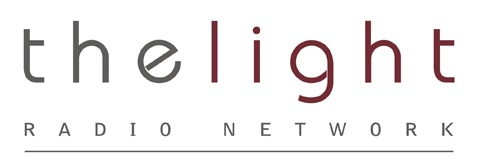
Previous logo

W266CU was formerly owned by Northeast Broadcasting as a translator for WFAD in Middlebury; in December 2022, Christian Ministries agreed to acquire both facilities. Following the deal's completion in February 2023, WFAD was expected to switch from carrying Northeast's The Point network to The Light. WFAD was sold to Mud Radio in 2025.
