= Mill Village Historic District (Waterbury, Vermont) =

Historic district in Vermont, United States

- U.S. National Register of Historic Places
- U.S. Historic district
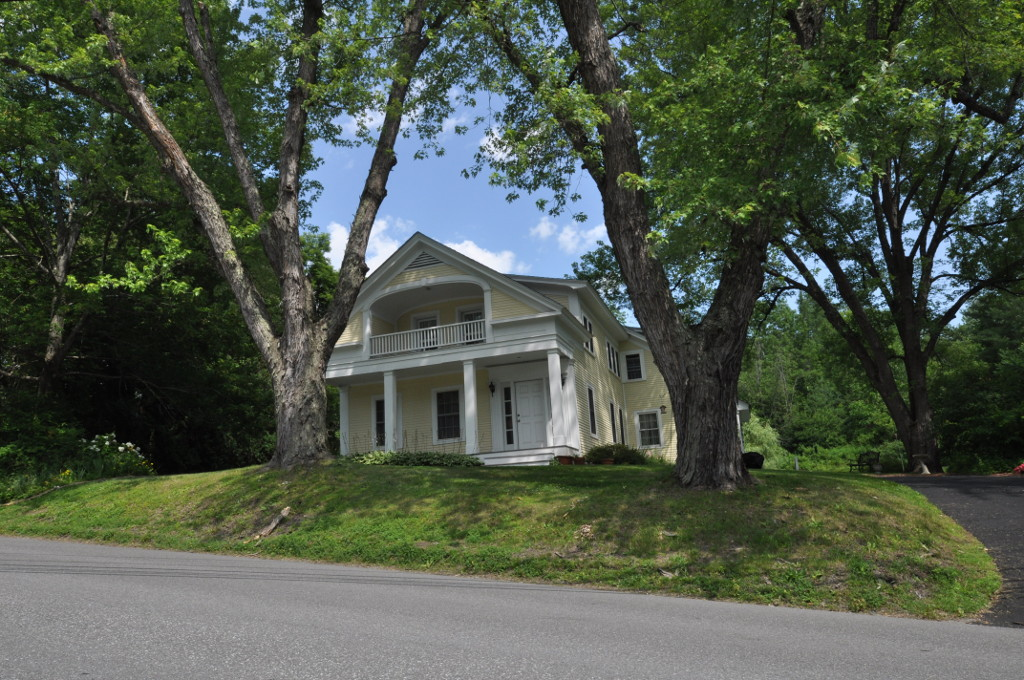
- The Baker House

- Location within Vermont Location within the United States
- Location: Roughly bounded by VT 100, I-89, and Stowe St., Waterbury, Vermont
- Coordinates: 44°20′35″N 72°44′52″W
- Area: 18 acres (7.3 ha)
- Architectural style: Greek Revival, Italianate, Cape Cod
- NRHP reference No.: 79000229
- Added to NRHP: June 12, 1979

The Mill Village Historic District encompasses a small 19th-century industrial village on Stowe Street in Waterbury, Vermont. The area is a compact and somewhat isolated example of a mill village of the mid-19th century; it is roughly bounded by Stowe Street, Graves Brook, and the northbound offramp of Exit 10 from Interstate 89. It was listed on the National Register of Historic Places in 1979.

== Description and history ==
Waterbury's historic Mill Village area is now a quiet residential area, but it was for much of the 19th century a bustling industrial area. Powered by the waters of Graves (or Thatcher's) Brook, a number of mills and small industrial operations thrived into the 20th century, when advances in industrial power and economy of scale spelled their decline. Only one mill building survives: now known as the Waterbury Feed Company, and its accompanying dam and penstock date to about 1830. The other surviving buildings in the district are residential, with most built between 1860 and 1890.

The district is bounded on the north by the bridge carrying Stowe Street across Graves Brook, and on the south by the northbound offramp of Exit 10 off Interstate 89. The ramp and high pass high over the area, with the footings for their bridges partially set on former industrial areas. The district includes houses on North Street, a side loop off Stowe Street, and Seabury Lane, a short spur extending west from North Street. Most of the houses in the district are vernacular, with some indications of either Greek Revival or Italianate styling. The most elaborate house in the district is the Baker house, which features a three-bay Greek Revival temple portico with a recessed porch set under a segmented arch in the gable.

== See also ==
- National Register of Historic Places listings in Washington County, Vermont
