= Ralph DesLauriers =

American businessman (1935–2025)

Ralph Roland DesLauriers (February 2, 1935 – October 4, 2025) was an American businessman. With his father, he was the founder of Bolton Valley Resort.

DesLauriers was born in Brockton, Massachusetts, on February 2, 1935. In 2025 the New England Ski Museum awarded DesLauriers and his family the Spirit of Skiing Award. DesLauriers died on October 4, 2025, at the age of 90.
