= Northern Power Systems =

Wind turbine company

- Type: Public
- Industry: Wind Power Solar Power
- Founded: 1974
- Headquarters: Bisaccia, Avellino, Italy
- Area served: Worldwide
- Products: Wind turbines
- Services: Design Installation Manufacturing Solar Energy Systems Operations and Maintenance
- Website: https://www.nps100.com/wp/

Northern Power Systems is a renewable energy company headquartered in Italy. The company specializes in the design, manufacturing, and deployment of wind turbines and solar energy systems for commercial and industrial applications.

== History ==
Northern Power Systems was originally founded in 1974 as North Wind Power Company in Warren, Vermont, USA.

During the 1990s, Northern Power Systems developed its first 100 kW wind turbine.

In 2014, the company established a European operational branch in Italy. Following a management buyout in 2019, the European branch became an independent company, acquiring exclusive licenses on NPS technology and relocating its headquarters to Italy.

In 2023, Northern Power Systems re-entered the U.S. market.
