= WNGN (FM) =

- Argyle, New York; United States
- Broadcast area: Saratoga Springs; Glens Falls
- Frequency: 91.9 MHz
- Branding: Northeast Gospel Network

Programming
- Format: Christian radio
- Affiliations: SRN News; Moody Broadcasting Network

Ownership
- Owner: Northeast Gospel Broadcasting Inc

History
- First air date: August 1994
- Former call signs: WZYB (1992–1993); WNGX (1993–1998)
- Call sign meaning: Northeast Gospel Network

Technical information
- Licensing authority: FCC
- Facility ID: 11120
- Class: A
- ERP: 2,000 watts
- HAAT: 174 meters (571 ft)
- Transmitter coordinates: 43°13′33.2″N 73°26′32.4″W
- Translator: See § Translators
- Repeater: See § Simulcast

Links
- Public license information: Public file; LMS
- Website: www.northeastgospel.com

WNGN (91.9 MHz) is a listener-supported, non-commercial FM radio station licensed to Argyle, New York, and serving the Saratoga Springs and Glens Falls areas of New York. The station is owned by Northeast Gospel Broadcasting Inc. It airs a mix of Christian talk and contemporary Christian music. The studios are on King Road in Buskirk.

WNGN is a Class A FM station with an effective radiated power (ERP) of 2,000 watts. The transmitter tower is on Street Road in Argyle. WNGN is also simulcast on a Massachusetts FM station and on two FM translators in the region.

== History ==
The station, while it was still a construction permit, was assigned the call letters as WZYB on May 7, 1992. On September 1, 1993, the station changed its call sign to WNGX.

It officially signed on the air in August 1994. On July 13, 1998, the call letters became WNGN.

Former logo

In 2009, WNGN announced that two new affiliated stations would go on the air: WNGB (91.3 FM) in Petersham, Massachusetts, and WNGF (89.9 FM) in Swanton, Vermont. In August 2013, Northeast Gospel Broadcasting reached a deal to sell WNGF to Christian Ministries.

== Simulcast ==
Call sign	Frequency	City of license	Facility ID	ERP W	Height m (ft)	Class	Transmitter coordinates
WNGB	91.3 FM	Petersham, Massachusetts	172199	600	−53 m (−174 ft)	A	42°31′30″N 72°16′42″W

== Translators ==
In addition to the main station, WNGN is relayed by FM translators to widen its broadcast area.

Broadcast translators for WNGN
Call sign	Frequency	City of license	FID	ERP (W)	Class	Transmitter coordinates	FCC info
W248AX	97.5 FM	Albany, New York	140544	100	D	42°40′49″N 73°47′46″W	LMS
W279AL	103.7 FM	Catskill, New York	140583	15	D	42°11′13″N 73°48′42″W	LMS
