= Waterbury (CDP), Vermont =

Census-designated place in Vermont, United States

Waterbury, Vermont
- Census-designated place
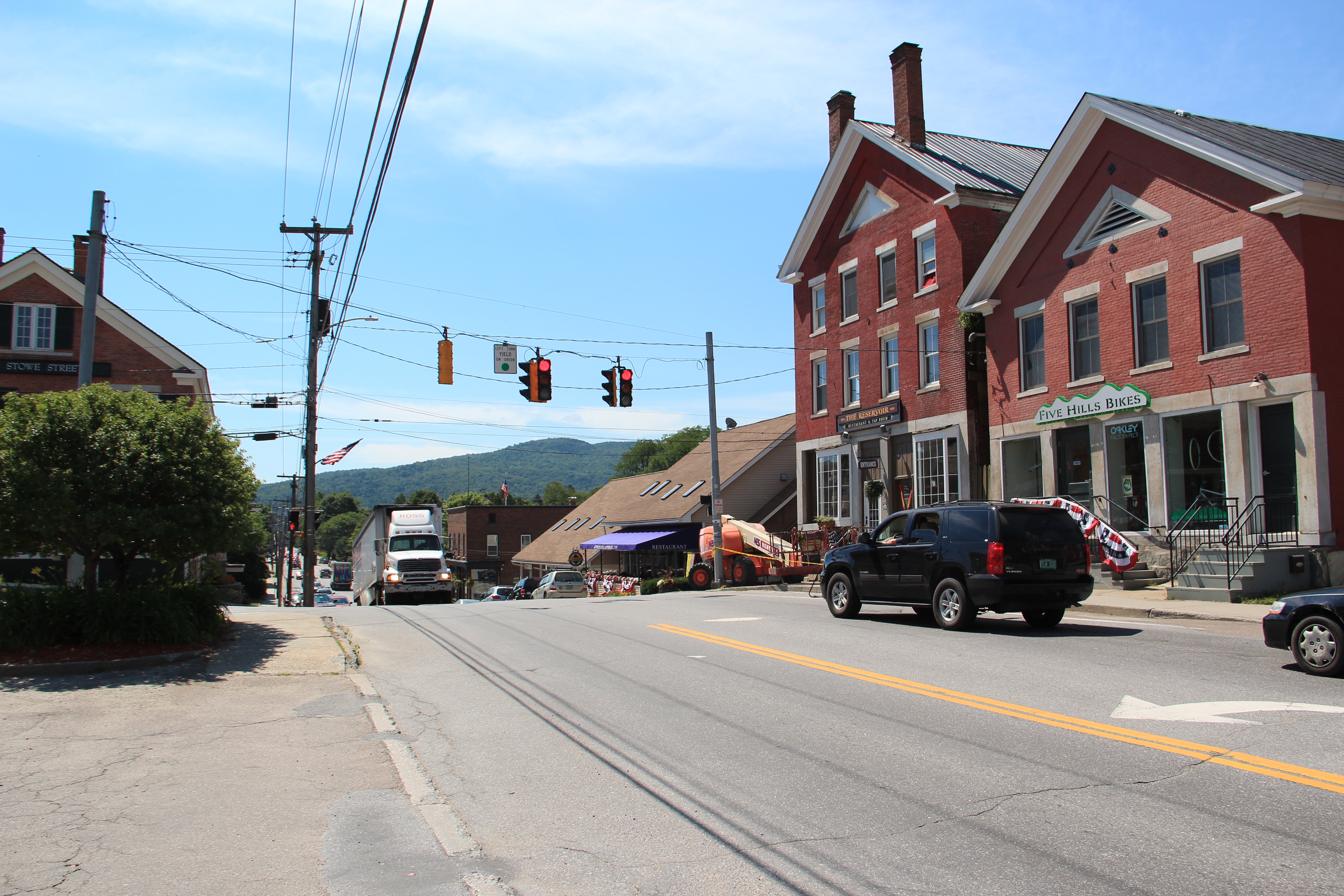

- Location in Washington County and the state of Vermont
- Coordinates: 44°20′32″N 72°44′55″W
- Country: United States
- State: Vermont
- County: Washington
- Town: Waterbury

Area
  - Total: 1.9 sq mi (5.0 km^{2})
  - Land: 1.9 sq mi (4.9 km^{2})
  - Water: 0.039 sq mi (0.1 km^{2})
- Elevation: 449 ft (137 m)

Population (2020)
  - Total: 1,897
  - Density: 1,000/sq mi (390/km^{2})
- Time zone: UTC-5 (Eastern (EST))
  - Summer (DST): UTC-4 (EDT)
- ZIP codes: 05671, 05676
- Area code: 802
- FIPS code: 50-76900
- GNIS feature ID: 2803714

Waterbury is an unincorporated village and census-designated place (CDP) in the town of Waterbury, Washington County, Vermont, United States. The population was 1,897 at the 2020 census. The former village of Waterbury was dissolved in 2017, and its governmental functions were merged with the town of Waterbury.

== Geography ==
According to the United States Census Bureau, the village had a total area of 1.9 square miles (5.0 km^{2}), of which 1.9 square miles (4.9 km^{2}) were land and 0.04 square miles (0.1 km^{2}), or 2.31%, were water.

== Demographics ==
Historical population
Census	Pop.	Note	%±
1880	756		—
1890	955		26.3%
1900	1,597		67.2%
1910	1,377		−13.8%
1920	1,515		10.0%
1930	1,776		17.2%
1940	3,074		73.1%
1950	3,153		2.6%
1960	2,984		−5.4%
1970	2,840		−4.8%
1980	1,892		−33.4%
1990	1,702		−10.0%
2000	1,706		0.2%
2010	1,763		3.3%
2020	1,897		7.6%
U.S. Decennial Census

As of the census of 2000, there were 1,706 people, 793 households, and 409 families residing in the village. The population density was 958.9 people per square mile (370.1/km^{2}). There were 823 housing units at an average density of 462.6/sq mi (178.5/km^{2}). The racial makeup of the village was 97.30% White, 0.23% Black or African American, 0.18% Native American, 0.88% Asian, 0.41% from other races, and 1.00% from two or more races. Hispanic or Latino of any race were 0.59% of the population.

There were 793 households, out of which 25.6% had children under the age of 18 living with them, 39.1% were married couples living together, 9.0% had a female householder with no husband present, and 48.4% were non-families. 36.6% of all households were made up of individuals, and 13.6% had someone living alone who was 65 years of age or older. The average household size was 2.09 and the average family size was 2.78.

On June 7, 2012, village approved new laws regarding same-sex civil and religious marriage.

In the village, the population was spread out, with 21.0% under the age of 18, 6.9% from 18 to 24, 36.2% from 25 to 44, 23.0% from 45 to 64, and 12.9% who were 65 years of age or older. The median age was 37 years. For every 100 females, there were 95.9 males. For every 100 females age 18 and over, there were 91.3 males.

The median income for a household in the village was $37,218, and the median income for a family was $47,708. Males had a median income of $31,709 versus $25,382 for females. The per capita income for the village was $20,678. About 7.0% of families and 9.3% of the population were below the poverty line, including 14.7% of those under age 18 and 2.1% of those age 65 or over.

== Education ==
It is in the Harwood Unified Union School District. The district's comprehensive high school is Harwood Union Middle and High School.
