= Bolton, Vermont =

- Town
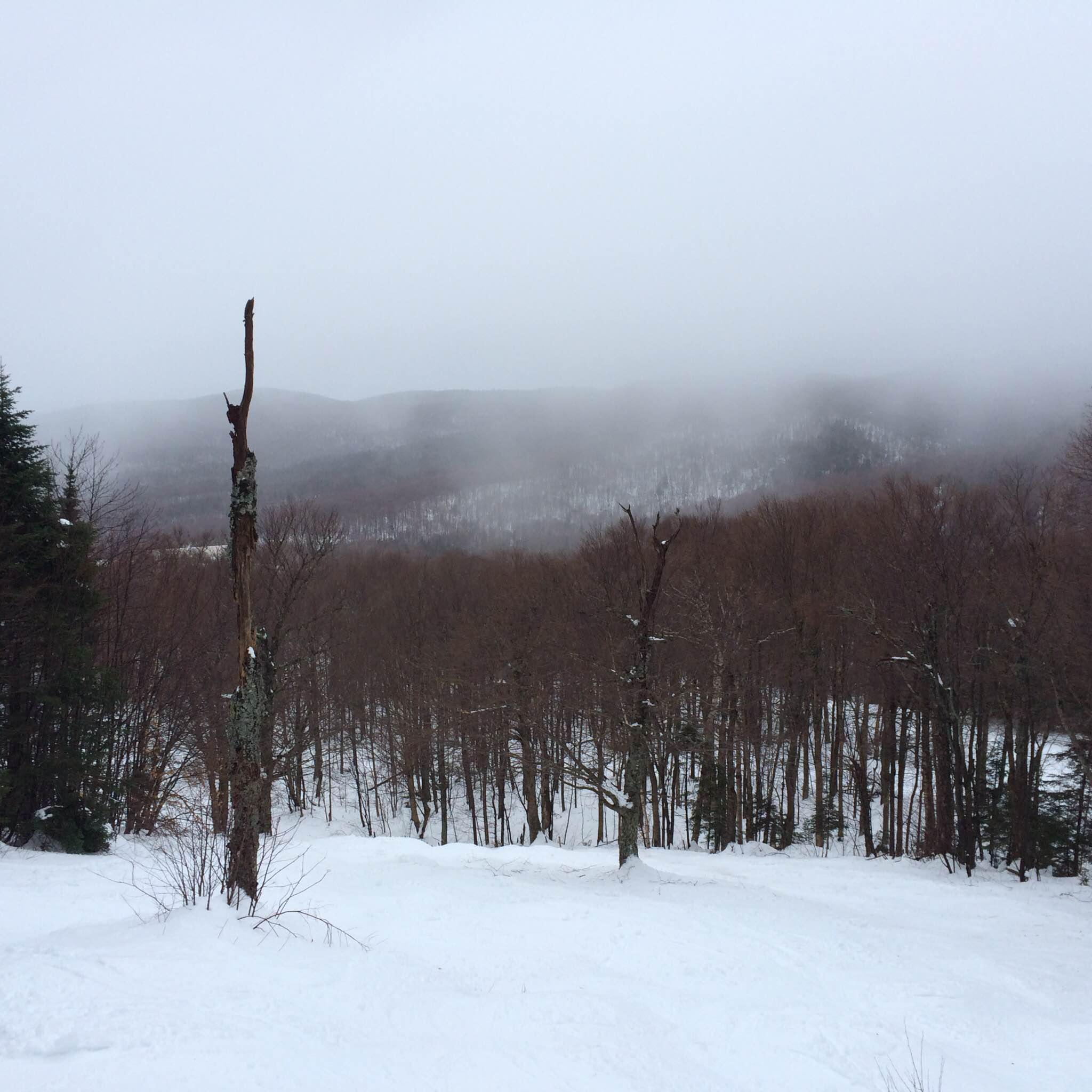
- A view of Bolton Valley

- Seal

- Location in Chittenden County and the state of Vermont
- Coordinates: 44°23′09″N 72°52′34″W
- Country: United States
- State: Vermont
- County: Chittenden
- Communities: Bolton; Bolton Valley; West Bolton

Area
  - Total: 42.5 sq mi (110.2 km^{2})
  - Land: 42.2 sq mi (109.4 km^{2})
  - Water: 0.27 sq mi (0.7 km^{2})
- Elevation: 1,011 ft (308 m)

Population (2020)
  - Total: 1,301
  - Density: 31/sq mi (11.9/km^{2})
- Time zone: UTC-5 (Eastern (EST))
  - Summer (DST): UTC-4 (EDT)
- ZIP Codes: 05465 (Jericho); 05466 (Jonesville); 05477 (Bolton Valley); 05676 (Waterbury)
- Area code: 802
- FIPS code: 50-06550
- GNIS feature ID: 1462045
- Website: boltonvt.com

Bolton is a town in Chittenden County, Vermont, United States. The population was 1,301 at the time of the 2020 census. The town is home to Bolton Valley, a popular ski resort.

The main road passing through the town is U.S. Route 2, which follows the north bank of the Winooski River. Interstate 89 also passes through the town, parallel to Route 2, but does not have an interchange there.

== Geography ==
Bolton is located in eastern Chittenden County, bordered to the east by Washington County. The main crest of the Green Mountains runs north to south through the eastern part of the town, and the Winooski River, running east to west, cuts through the mountains south of the center of the town. According to the United States Census Bureau, the town has a total area of 42.5 square miles (110.2 km^{2}), of which 42.2 square miles (109.4 km^{2}) is land and 0.3 square miles (0.7 km^{2}), or 0.65%, is water.

The town is predominantly rural. There are four principal settlements:

- Bolton proper is in the Winooski River valley, on the north side of the river.
- West Bolton is in the northwestern corner of the town, and is accessed primarily from the adjacent town of Jericho.
- A thin strip of land, known as "the back side of the river", is located south of the Winooski River. The only road access is through the neighboring towns of Richmond and Duxbury.
- A small number of year-round residents live near the Bolton Valley ski area in the northeastern part of the town.

The Long Trail passes through Bolton on its way from Camel's Hump to Mount Mansfield.

== Demographics ==
Historical population
Census	Pop.	Note	%±
1790	88		—
1800	219		148.9%
1810	249		13.7%
1820	306		22.9%
1830	452		47.7%
1840	470		4.0%
1850	602		28.1%
1860	645		7.1%
1870	711		10.2%
1880	674		−5.2%
1890	547		−18.8%
1900	486		−11.2%
1910	469		−3.5%
1920	390		−16.8%
1930	325		−16.7%
1940	287		−11.7%
1950	301		4.9%
1960	237		−21.3%
1970	427		80.2%
1980	715		67.4%
1990	971		35.8%
2000	971		0.0%
2010	1,182		21.7%
2020	1,301		10.1%
U.S. Decennial Census

As of the census of 2000, there were 971 people, 368 households, and 260 families residing in the town. The population density was 22.9 people per square mile (8.8/km^{2}). There were 412 housing units at an average density of 9.7 per square mile (3.7/km^{2}). The racial makeup of the town was 98.15% White, 0.10% African American, 0.41% Native American, 0.21% Asian, 0.21% from other races, and 0.93% from two or more races. Hispanic or Latino of any race were 0.31% of the population.

There were 368 households, of which 40.8% had children under the age of 18 living with them, 57.9% were married couples living together, 7.6% had a female householder with no husband present, and 29.3% were non-families. 19.3% of all households were made up of individuals, and 4.6% had someone living alone who was 65 years of age or older. The average household size was 2.64 and the average family size was 3.09.

The median income for a household in the town was $49,625, and the median income for a family was $55,486. Men had a median income of $39,375 versus $28,958 for women. The per capita income for the town was $24,256. About 3.6% of families and 5.3% of the population were below the poverty line, including 7.7% of those under age 18 and 1.7% of those age 65 or over.

== Schools ==
Bolton has its own elementary school (Pre-K to 4th grade). The Ellen P. Smilie Memorial School's benefactor was Ellen Pinneo, born in 1849 in Pinneo Flats in Bolton. She attended the Pinneo Flats School, which was later destroyed by the flood of 1927. Ellen married Melville Smilie and moved to Montpelier where she lived for many years until her death on December 17, 1933. After the flood of 1927 washed away her old schoolhouse, she donated $1000 toward the rebuilding of another school on Pinneo Flats. In her will, she bequeathed a sum of money to the Memorial School. When I-89 was constructed through Bolton and cut off access to the Memorial School, it was demolished and in 1960 part of the present school was erected. In September 1999, a large addition was completed adding five new classrooms and a large gym to the existing building. A final gift was made that made it possible to enlarge the library facility and increase the number of books. The school is exceptional with a strong partnership with Smilie families and Townspeople.

On November 4, 2014, the communities of Bolton, Jericho, Richmond, Underhill ID and Underhill Town voted to form the Mount Mansfield Modified Union School District, also known as the MMMUSD. This new school district serves and governs the current town school districts of Bolton (Smilie Memorial School), Jericho (Jericho Elementary), Richmond (Richmond Elementary), Underhill ID School District (Underhill ID Elementary), Underhill Town (Underhill Central School), Mt Mansfield Union School District (Browns River Middle, Camels Hump Middle and Mt. Mansfield Union High Schools) in grades Pre-K through 12 and Huntington students grades 5–12.

== Notable people ==
- Alison Bechdel, cartoonist
- Ethan Tapper, forester and author
