= Waterbury, Vermont =

- Town
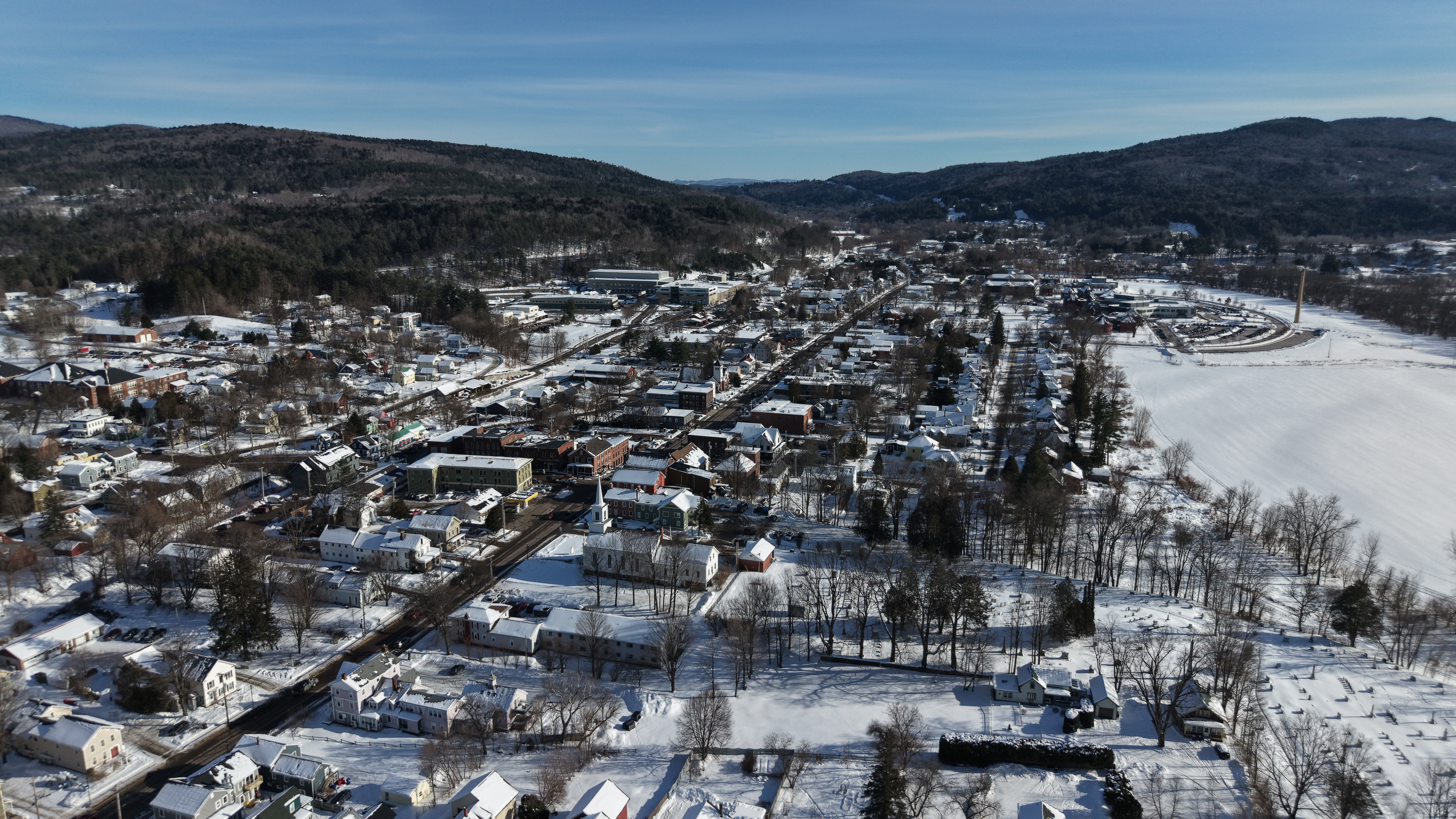
- Waterbury, VT, from the northwest

- Logo

- Location in Washington County and the state of Vermont.
- Coordinates: 44°23′07″N 72°45′20″W
- Country: United States
- State: Vermont
- County: Washington
- Communities: Waterbury; Waterbury Center; Colbyville; Mill Village

Area
  - Total: 49.7 sq mi (128.8 km^{2})
  - Land: 48.2 sq mi (124.9 km^{2})
  - Water: 1.5 sq mi (3.9 km^{2})
- Elevation: 587 ft (179 m)

Population (2020)
  - Total: 5,331
  - Density: 110.5/sq mi (42.68/km^{2})
- Time zone: UTC-5 (Eastern (EST))
  - Summer (DST): UTC-4 (EDT)
- ZIP Codes: 05671, 05676 (Waterbury); 05677 (Waterbury Center)
- Area code: 802
- FIPS code: 50-76975
- GNIS feature ID: 1462244
- Website: www.waterburyvt.com

Waterbury is a town in Washington County in central Vermont, United States. Although the town is still home to the Waterbury Village Historic District, the village sharing the name of the town officially dissolved as a municipality in 2018. As of the 2020 census, the population was 5,331.

== History ==
The townsite was once the frontier between the Mahican and Pennacook people. European settlement dates from 1763, when King George III granted a charter for land in the Winooski River valley. James Marsh became the first permanent white settler in the region in 1783. Many of the early settlers came from Waterbury, Connecticut, and named their new town in honor of the hometown. The village of Waterbury was incorporated in 1882 with a population of over 2,000.

The Central Vermont Railroad came to Waterbury in 1849. The railroad expanded a passenger station for the railroad in 1875, making the station a more major stop on the Vermonter. The Green Mountain Seminary was built in Waterbury Center in 1869.

The state opened the Vermont State Asylum for the Insane in Waterbury in 1891. The hospital, renamed the Vermont State Hospital, grew to occupy over 40 buildings, but by the 1980s the number of patients had declined to the point where only one building was required. The remainder of the campus came to be used for state offices.

Like many New England towns, Waterbury's economy was based around the local river mill industry and the surrounding agricultural producers. The mills produced products such as lumber and finished wood products, wicker products, leather, starch, and alcohol. The agriculture was based on sheep through the 19th century but switched over to dairy farming by the 20th century. Waterbury had a ski factory in the 1940s, the Derby & Ball Company.

In 1927, Waterbury, like many other Vermont communities, was devastated by flooding. Inscriptions on the sides of some buildings in Waterbury village purport to show where the level of the water rose during the 1927 flood. The village recovered, and in 1938 the Waterbury Dam was built on the Little River by the Army Corps of Engineers to control future flooding in areas downstream of the town center.

On August 29, 2011, Tropical Storm Irene flooded downtown Waterbury and filled the buildings of the Vermont State Hospital, Vermont's public psychiatric complex, with up to 6 feet (1.8 m) of water. Patients from the mental hospital were temporarily housed in various locations around Vermont, and over 1,100 of the 1,586 state employees were working in office space in other towns as of October 2011. The state was expected to decide by 2012 whether to relocate all or part of the workforce back to Waterbury.

In 2017, the citizens within the Village of Waterbury voted to dissolve it as a municipality, completing their merger with the Town of Waterbury. The Village dissolved on June 30, 2018.

== Economy ==
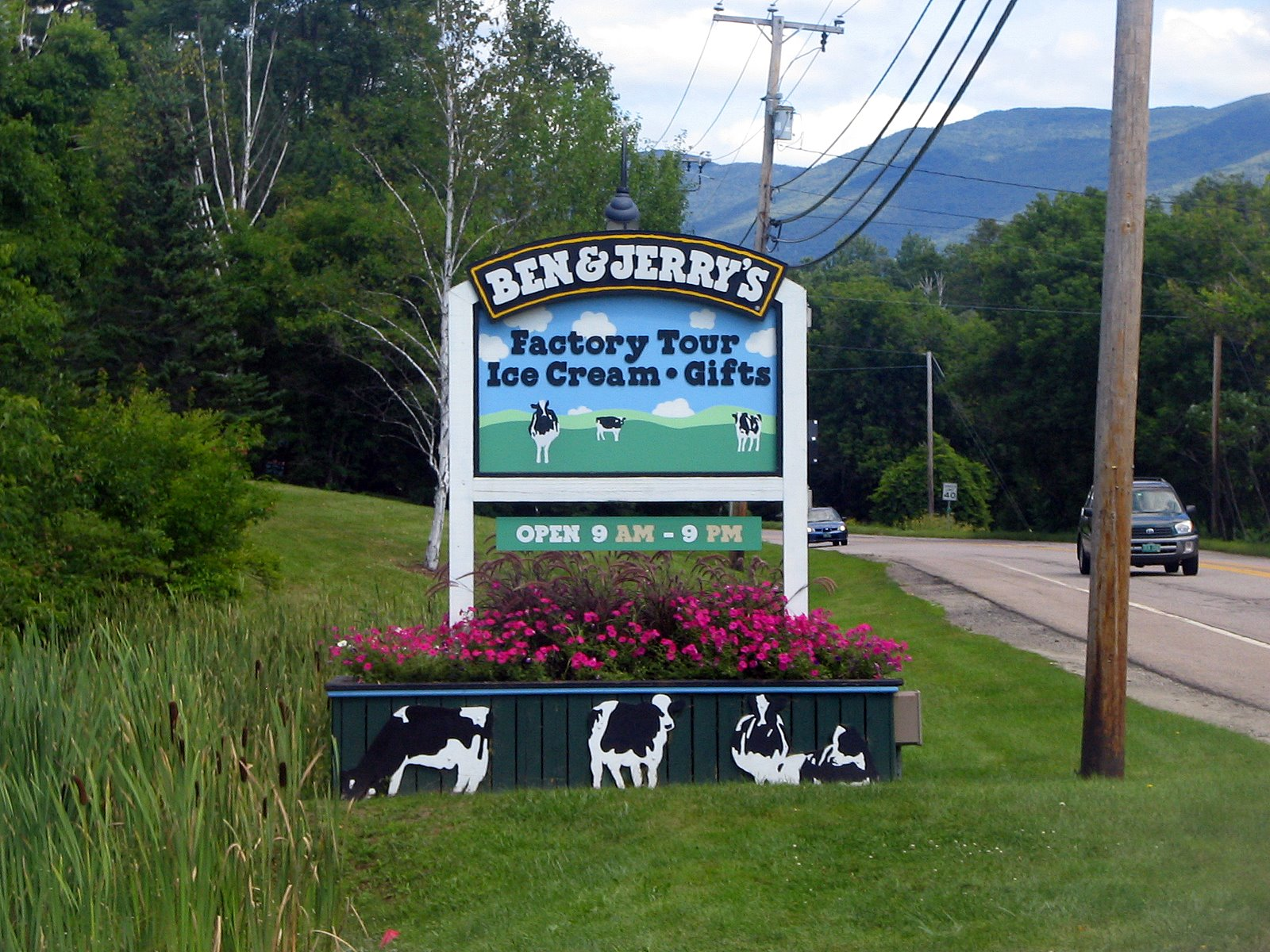
A sign leading to Ben & Jerry's Ice Cream factory in Waterbury

Waterbury is the location of Ben & Jerry's Ice Cream, whose factory tours have become one of Vermont's most popular tourist attractions. Other local businesses include a number of restaurants and bars. Businesses in the town, which sits between several major mountains including Mount Mansfield, typically thrive during the month of October, when tourism swells thanks to fall foliage.

== Demographics ==
Historical population
Census	Pop.	Note	%±
1790	93		—
1800	644		592.5%
1810	966		50.0%
1820	1,269		31.4%
1830	1,650		30.0%
1840	1,992		20.7%
1850	2,352		18.1%
1860	2,198		−6.5%
1870	2,633		19.8%
1880	2,297		−12.8%
1890	2,232		−2.8%
1900	2,810		25.9%
1910	3,273		16.5%
1920	3,542		8.2%
1930	4,045		14.2%
1940	4,118		1.8%
1950	4,276		3.8%
1960	4,303		0.6%
1970	4,614		7.2%
1980	4,465		−3.2%
1990	4,589		2.8%
2000	4,915		7.1%
2010	5,064		3.0%
2020	5,331		5.3%
U.S. Decennial Census

As of the census of 2000, there were 4,915 people, 2,011 households, and 1,321 families residing in the town. The population density was 810.4 people per square mile (312.9/km^{2}). There were 2,106 housing units at an average density of 347.2 per square mile (134.1/km^{2}). The racial makeup of the town was 97.80% White, 0.26% African American, 0.12% Native American, 0.65% Asian, 0.26% from other races, and 0.89% from two or more races. Hispanic or Latino of any race were 0.67% of the population.

There were 2,011 households, out of which 24.0% had children under the age of 18 living with them, 54.2% were married couples living together, 7.9% had a female householder with no husband present, and 34.3% were non-families. 25.6% of all households were made up of individuals, and 9.5% had someone living alone who was 65 years of age or older. The average household size was 2.42 and the average family size was 2.93.

In the town, the population was spread out, with 25.1% under the age of 18, 5.5% from 18 to 24, 32.8% from 25 to 44, 26.2% from 45 to 64, and 10.3% who were 65 years of age or older. The median age was 37.7 years. For every 100 females, there were 97.4 males. For every 100 females age 18 and over, there were 93.4 males.

The median income for a household in the town was $44,940, and the median income for a family was $60,547. Males had a median income of $35,566 versus $25,838 for females. The per capita income for the town was $25,858. About 3.3% of families and 6.1% of the population were below the poverty line, including 7.0% of those under age 18 and 4.9% of those age 65 or over.

== Government and infrastructure ==
The State of Vermont operates the Waterbury Office Complex. The Vermont Department of Corrections has its headquarters in the Waterbury Office Complex.

== Education ==
Waterbury belongs to the Harwood Unified Union School District. Students attend Brookside Primary School for grades preschool and Kindergarten through 4th grade, Crossett Brook Middle School for grades 5–8, and Harwood Union High School for grades 9–12.

Previously it was in the Duxbury/Waterbury Union School District 45.

== Transportation ==
Amtrak, the national passenger rail system, provides daily service to Waterbury, operating its Vermonter between St. Albans and Washington, D.C.

The Green Mountain Transit Agency (GMTA) provides public transit bus services to Burlington, Montpelier, Morrisville, and Stowe.

Waterbury is served by Interstate 89, U.S. Route 2, and Route 100.

== Media ==
Radio station WDEV -550 AM & 96.1 FM (News/Talk), is located in town, with its offices and studios on Stowe Street. WAVJ –103.3 FM is officially licensed to Waterbury and has its transmission tower located on Ricker Mountain (which it shares with former sister station WNCS Montpelier), but its programming originates with the Air1 network in Franklin, Tennessee.

The Waterbury Record was a weekly newspaper that served the local area. On March 26, 2020, the Vermont Community Newspaper Group announced that it was suspending publication of the Waterbury Record, after 13 years of publication, citing the lack of widespread advertising support and now the economic impact of the coronavirus pandemic.

In May 2020 a web-based publication, the Waterbury Roundabout, was founded by Lisa Scagliotti to provide local news with support from the University of Vermont’s Community News Service. A partnership was formed with the Barre Montpelier Times Argus to distribute a free weekly printed "Waterbury Reader" to residents of Waterbury. That partnership ended in September 2022 and the Waterbury Roundabout returned to being a web-only publication.

== Notable people ==
- Charles J. Adams, Vermont Attorney General
- Elmer Ellsworth Adams, Minnesota newspaper editor and politician
- Harold D. Campbell, Major general in the Marine Corps during World War II
- Paul Dillingham, 29th governor of Vermont
- William P. Dillingham, 42nd governor of Vermont
- Wallace M. Greene, commandant of the Marine Corps
- Henry Janes, soldier, humanitarian and chief surgeon at Gettysburg
- Thomas D. Kinley, US Army major general, lived in Waterbury Center
- Ken Squier, NASCAR commentator for CBS
- William Wells, merchant, Civil War general and Medal of Honor recipient

== Climate ==
This climatic region is typified by large seasonal temperature differences, with warm to hot (and often humid) summers that are known to occasionally reach 90 to 100 degrees and cold (sometimes severely cold) winters. According to the Köppen Climate Classification system, Waterbury has a humid continental climate, abbreviated "Dfb" on climate maps.
