= WKAF (AM) =

- St. Albans, Vermont; United States
- Broadcast area: Burlington-Plattsburgh area
- Frequency: 1420 kHz
- Branding: The Swan

Programming
- Format: Full service

Ownership
- Owner: Kalani Bowles; (Sky Radio & Press, LLC)

History
- First air date: June 19, 1941 (as WWSR)
- Former call signs: WWSR (1941–2002); WTWK (2002); WRSA (2002–2024)

Technical information
- Licensing authority: FCC
- Facility ID: 34812
- Class: D
- Power: 1,000 watts day; 107 watts night
- Transmitter coordinates: 44°49′52.16″N 73°5′23.49″W

Links
- Public license information: Public file; LMS
- Webcast: Listen live
- Website: myswanradio.com

WKAF (1420 kHz) is a commercial AM radio station licensed to the City of St. Albans, Vermont. It is owned by Kalani Bowles, through licensee Sky Radio & Press, LLC. It airs a full service format.

WKAF's transmitter is off Lower Newton Road (Route 38) in the Town of St. Albans. It broadcasts at 1,000 watts by day, but to protect other stations on AM 1420, it reduces power at night to 107 watts. A non-directional antenna is used at all times.

== History ==
WKAF is Vermont's fourth oldest radio station, and the first north of Burlington. On June 19, 1941, the station first signed on as WWSR at 1390 kHz. With the enactment of the North American Regional Broadcasting Agreement (NARBA), the station moved to AM 1420 the following year. WWSR was owned by the Vermont Radio Corporation and broadcast at 1,000 watts. It was a daytimer, required to be off the air at night.

In April 1970, it added an FM station, WWSR-FM 102.3. At first it simulcast the AM station but it later began airing an automated adult contemporary format known as "Hit Parade". Today it is WWMP, a mainstream rock station owned by Radio Broadcasting Services, Inc.

In the 1990s, WWSR was authorized by the FCC to broadcast at night, but only at 110 watts. After changing to WTWK on March 13, 2002, the station was assigned the WRSA call sign by the Federal Communications Commission on April 23, 2002. There is an unrelated WRSA-FM in Huntsville, Alabama.

WRSA switched affiliations from ESPN Radio to Fox Sports Radio on January 1, 2011. The ESPN affiliation moved to WCPV (101.3 FM). On January 1, 2012, WRSA began to simulcast the oldies format of co-owned WIFY "Cruisin' 93.7" in Addison, Vermont.

WRSA flipped to a comedy radio format in September 2014, along with co-owned WCAT (1390 AM) in Burlington, Vermont. WRSA and WCAT returned to music programming with a hybrid of oldies and classic country in July 2015. On October 30, 2015, WRSA went silent, along with WCAT. According to FCC records, the station had also been silenced in 2013.

Effective May 20, 2019, WRSA was acquired from Radio Broadcasting Services, Incorporated by the Radio Sound Company, including a construction permit for an FM translator in St. Albans, W262DH 100.3 MHz. WRSA returned to the air in spring 2019, simulcast with WCAT, carrying a business news format mostly supplied by Bloomberg Radio. On June 1, 2019, the station began local operation and ended the affiliation with Bloomberg. The format was a variety of music, and local programming. The new owners pledged to air local information.

After encountering financial issues, Radio Sound Company took WRSA off the air February 6, 2020. Effective May 1, 2020, the station's license and the translator construction permit were transferred back to Radio Broadcasting Services, Incorporated for $1 and assumption of debt outstanding from the 2019 sale. The FCC cancelled the construction permit for W262DH effective October 1, 2021. WCAT's license was surrendered and cancelled on November 1, 2022.

In 2024, WRSA was sold to Kalani Bowles’s Sky Radio & Press in a $25,000 deal; at the time of the sale, it was simulcasting 102.3, by then hot adult contemporary station WIXM. The new owners would change the call sign to WKAF on September 6, 2024.

On July 7, 2025, WKAF dropped its simulcast with WWMP and launched a full service format targeting women, branded as "The Swan". The format contains music blocks such as Top 40, adult contemporary, and indie music, as well as news, talk, and sports programs. Despite its branding, "The Swan" does not lean towards misandry.
