= WIFY =

Adult album alternative radio station in Addison, Vermont, United States

Broadcasts The Point radio network
- Addison, Vermont; United States
- Broadcast area: Champlain Valley
- Frequency: 93.7 MHz
- Branding: The Point

Programming
- Format: Adult album alternative

Ownership
- Owner: Steven Silberberg and Edward Flanagan; (Radio Broadcasting Services, Inc.)
- Sister stations: WWMP

History
- First air date: 1999
- Former call signs: WWFY (1997–1999); WRRO (1999–2001); WXAL-FM (2001–2005); WUSX (2005–2010)

Technical information
- Licensing authority: FCC
- Facility ID: 83867
- Class: C3
- ERP: 21,000 watts
- HAAT: 108 meters (354 ft)
- Transmitter coordinates: 44°13′15.2″N 73°24′35.5″W

Links
- Public license information: Public file; LMS
- Website: www.pointfm.com

WIFY (93.7 FM) is an adult album alternative formatted radio station that is part of The Point radio network. Licensed to Addison, Vermont, United States, the station serves Middlebury, Vermont, Burlington, Vermont, and Plattsburgh, New York. WIFY is owned by Radio Broadcasting Services, Inc.

== History ==
The station was assigned call sign WWFY on December 8, 1997. On April 30, 1999, the call letters changed to WRRO. When the station launched, it went by the name "The Arrow" and broadcast a classic rock format. The station changed calls and formats again on April 23, 2001, to WXAL-FM with a hot adult contemporary format as "Alice".

In September 2002, WXAL-FM began simulcasting on WLKC (103.3 FM; now WAVJ). The simulcast gave "Alice" a better signal in Burlington. On June 1, 2005, WLKC and WXAL-FM flipped to an adult hits format as "MP 103"; WLKC became WWMP, and station identifications during this time ceased to mention WXAL-FM. That August, the station ended the WWMP simulcast and became classic country station "US 93.7", changing its call sign to WUSX on September 7.

On July 1, 2008, the station changed format from to oldies as "Cruisin' 93.7". The first song was 409 by The Beach Boys. Two years after the station went oldies, the call letters changed yet again on May 24, 2010, to the current WIFY. On September 2, 2014, WIFY dropped the oldies format and became part of the radio network known as The Point, with an adult album alternative format, simulcasting the Montpelier/Burlington network content of WNCS.
