= WWMP =

- Grand Isle, Vermont; United States
- Broadcast area: Burlington-Plattsburgh area
- Frequency: 102.3 MHz
- Branding: Rock 102.3

Programming
- Format: Mainstream rock

Ownership
- Owner: Radio Broadcasting Services, Inc.; (Lake Champlain Broadcasting Inc.)
- Sister stations: WIFY

History
- First air date: April 1970 (as WWSR-FM)
- Former call signs: WWSR-FM (1970–1980); WLFE (1980–2000); WLFE-FM (2000–2010); WIER (2010–2012); WIXM (2012–2024)
- Call sign meaning: former call sign of WIXM (103.3 FM), which was formerly branded "MP103"

Technical information
- Licensing authority: FCC
- Facility ID: 34811
- Class: C3
- ERP: 20,000 watts
- HAAT: 111 meters (364 ft)
- Transmitter coordinates: 44°45′53.1″N 73°35′14.5″W
- Translator: 98.3 W252CJ (Burlington)
- Repeater: 1240 WSKI (Montpelier)

Links
- Public license information: Public file; LMS
- Webcast: Listen live (via TuneIn)
- Website: rock1023fm.com

WWMP (102.3 FM) is a radio station licensed to Grand Isle, Vermont, and serves the Burlington-Plattsburgh area. The station is owned and operated by Radio Broadcasting Services, Inc. It airs a mainstream rock music format known as "Rock 102.3". WWMP operates a translator station in Burlington, W252CJ (98.3 FM); its programming is also simulcast on WSKI (1240 AM and 93.3 FM) in Montpelier.

WWMP has an effective radiated power (ERP) of 20,000 watts. While the station is licensed to a community in Vermont and has its studios and offices on Watertower Circle in Colchester, its transmitter is on Beartown Road in Beekmantown, New York, about ten miles north of Plattsburgh.

== History ==
=== WWSR-FM "Stereo 102" and WLFE-FM country ===
The station first signed on from St. Albans in April 1970 as WWSR-FM, the sister station of WWSR (1420 AM). Its format was adult contemporary music using the automated "Hit Parade" service, calling itself "Stereo 102". In the late 1970s, it dropped AC in favor of country music, using the call sign WLFE.

=== Active rock format (2008–2012) ===
The station flipped from country music to Christmas music in November 2008, and on December 29, 2008, the station moved to active rock as Rock 102 "Pure Rock Radio" to go up against alternative rock station WBTZ in nearby Plattsburgh, New York.

In January 2009, the station added The Todd and Tyler Radio Empire, a syndicated talk show based out of Omaha, Nebraska, to its morning schedule.

On March 1, 2010, WLFE-FM changed its call letters to WIER and rebranded as "102.3 The Wire".

=== Hot adult contemporary (2012–2024) ===
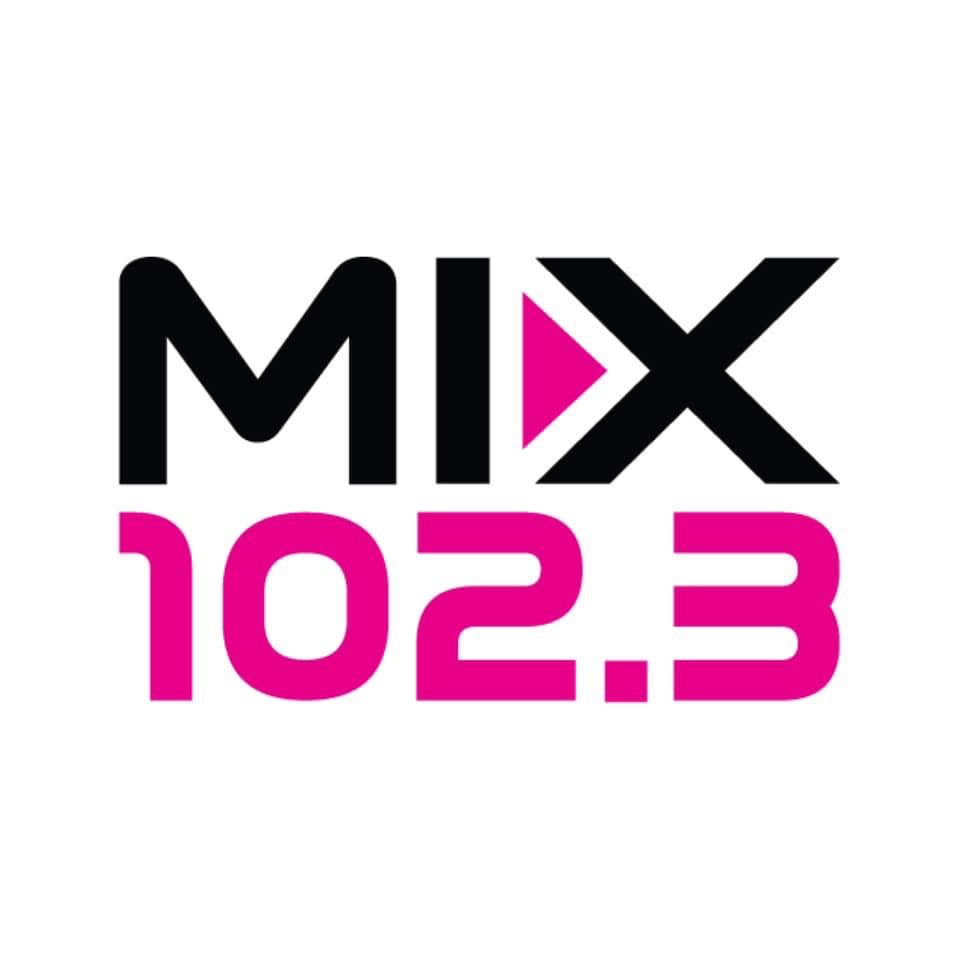
Logo as "Mix 102.3"

WIER switched to hot adult contemporary as "Mix 102.3" on March 30, 2012. The station played only a few 1980s hits, much like its rival WEZF. On August 13, 2012, the station changed its call sign to WIXM.

=== Mainstream rock (2024–present) ===
On September 12, 2024, the mainstream rock format of WWMP (103.3 FM) moved to WIXM; the two stations would swap call signs on September 18. With the move, the station also inherited WWMP's simulcast on WSKI (1240 AM and 93.3 FM) in Montpelier.

== Translator ==
Call sign	Frequency	City of license	FID	ERP (W)	HAAT	Class	Transmitter coordinates	FCC info
W252CJ	98.3 FM	Burlington, Vermont	155550	220	54.2 m (178 ft)	D	44°29′50.2″N 73°12′49.5″W	LMS
